= TVO (disambiguation) =

TVO is a Canadian television network, formerly named TVOntario. It may also refer to:

== Television ==
- Televisora de Oriente, a Venezuelan television station
- TV Osaka, a Japanese television station
- TVQ, which carried the on air branding of TV0 between 1983 and 1988

== Other uses ==
- Teollisuuden Voima, a Finnish nuclear power company
- Theatre Versus Oppression, a UK-registered charity which uses applied theatre techniques
- Tom Voltaire Okwalinga, Ugandan social media personality
- Total value of ownership, an evaluation method
- Total viable organism, a term for determining the microbial content of a sample
- TVO engine or petrol-paraffin engine, a dual-fuel internal combustion engine
- Tractor vaporising oil, an engine fuel for British tractors

== See also ==
- TiVo, a digital video recorder (DVR) brand
- tvOS, an Apple operating system
