= John W. Katende =

Ugandan lawyer and businessman

John Winston Katende
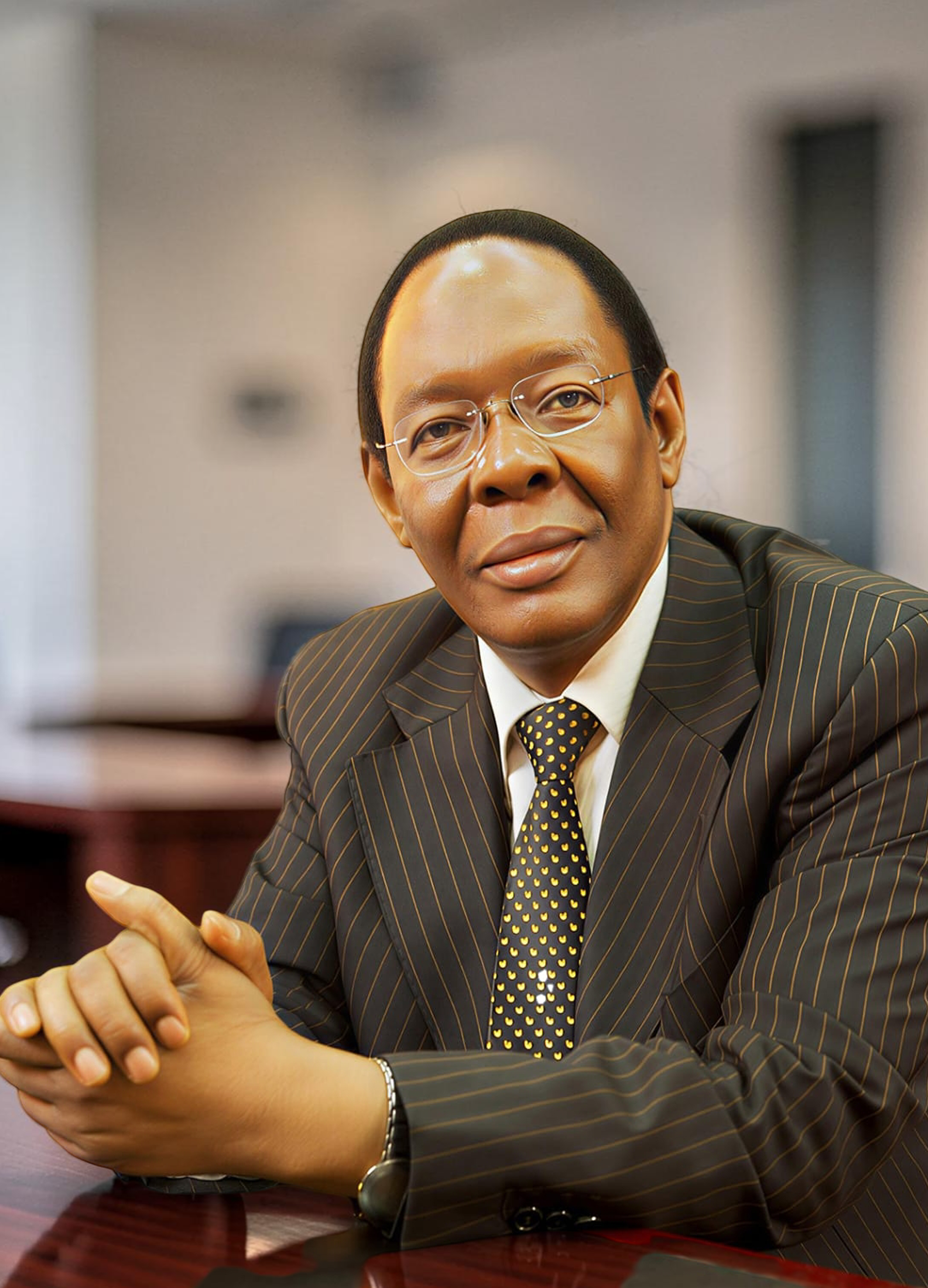
- Born: John Katende; 13 January 1945 (age 81); Uganda
- Citizenship: Uganda
- Education: Harvard Law School (Master of Laws); University of East Africa (Bachelor of Laws); Lubiri Secondary School (Certificate of Education); Makerere College School (Advanced Certificate of Educattion)
- Occupations: Lawyer and businessman
- Years active: 1977–present
- Title: Senior Counsel at Katende Ssempebwa & Co. Advocates (KATS)
- Spouse: Margaret Katende
- Children: 13 including Sim K Katende & Kato Katende

John Winston Katende (SC) commonly known as John W. Katende (born 13 January 1945) is a Ugandan lawyer, Senior Counsel, and businessman who formerly served as Attorney General for the Buganda Kingdom. He is among the founding partners of Katende, Ssempebwa Advocates (KATS), a law firm based in Uganda and has practiced law for more than five decades.

Katende has also been involved in the performing arts and received a lifetime achievement award at the inaugural Ikon Awards. He is the founder of The Ebonies, a Ugandan drama group established in 1977, and Aristoc Bookshop, a Ugandan book retail business. His professional work has included contributions to legal education, corporate law practice, and aspects of constitutional development in Uganda and the wider East and Central African region.

== Early life and education ==
Katende was born on 13 January 1945 in Buwambo village, Nangabo Sub-County, in present-day Wakiso District, Uganda to Yokana Drake Kakembo, a local chief, and Eseza Nalumansi Baagala Kakembo. He was given the name Winston after British Prime Minister Winston Churchill, while the name John is a Luganda form derived from his father’s name.

During his early childhood, Katende spent time around the Kabaka’s Palace at Mengo. He began his primary education at Aggrey Memorial School. After the death of his father in 1951, his family moved to Kalambi village near Buloba, where he attended Bira Primary School. He later continued his primary education at Ngogwe Primary School in Kyaggwe County, where his maternal uncle, Yona Kaweesa, was a teacher.

After completing the Primary Leaving Examinations, Katende joined King’s College Budo. He later transferred to Lubiri Secondary School, where he completed his O-Level education. During this period, he developed an interest in drama and performing arts. He later joined Makerere College School for his A-Level studies, where he developed an interest in law after reading The Discipline of Law by Lord Denning.

In 1966, Katende enrolled at the University of East Africa, Dar es Salaam College, to study law. At the time, the University of East Africa consisted of constituent colleges in Makerere, Nairobi, and Dar es Salaam. He graduated in 1968 with a Bachelor of Laws (LL.B). During his time at university, he studied in the same academic environment as Edward Kiwanuka Ssekandi and Yoweri Kaguta Museveni, who later served as Vice President and President of Uganda, respectively.

Katende later received a scholarship through the African Fellowship Program to pursue a Master of Laws (LL.M) at Harvard Law School, graduating in 1970. He was among the early cohorts of East African students to obtain an LL.M from the institution. During his studies at the University of Dar es Salaam, Katende was part of a cohort that included several students who later held senior legal and political positions in East Africa, including Edward Kiwanuka Ssekandi, Benjamin Odoki, Johnson Evans Gicheru, Augustino Ramadhani, James Ogoola, Amos Wako, and Yoweri Museveni.

== Legal Career ==
After graduating from the University of East Africa, Dar es Salaam, Katende was recommended by his lecturers to join the Makerere University Law School as an assistant lecturer. He later received fellowship scholarships to pursue a Master of Laws (LL.M) degree at both Oxford University and Harvard Law School, choosing Harvard, where he graduated in 1970. He was among the early Ugandan students to study at Harvard Law School.Following his return to Uganda in 1970, Katende joined Makerere University as a lecturer, where he taught courses including Introduction to Law and Law of Business Associations. During this period, he combined academic work with legal practice. Together with Frederick Ssempebwa, he established a law firm initially reminded as Kawoya & Co. Advocates, later renamed Katende, Ssempebwa & Co. Advocates, now commonly known as KATS Advocates.

During his academic career, Katende authored The Law of Business Associations in East and Central Africa, a legal text used in universities in the region. He also supervised and taught students who later joined the legal profession, public service, and academia. Katende has practiced law for more than five decades in Uganda and across the East and Central African region. His work has included corporate and commercial litigation, mediation and arbitration, banking and finance, capital markets, international trade, and mergers and acquisitions. Over the course of his career, he has been involved in constitutional and commercial legal matters.

Katende served as the Honorary Attorney General and Chief Legal Advisor to the Kingdom of Buganda and to the Kabaka of Buganda for more than thirteen years. He also served as Chairperson of the Buganda Constitutional Review Commission. On 31 July 1993, he administered the oath during the coronation ceremony of Kabaka Ronald Muwenda Mutebi II.

=== Academic work and mentorship ===
During his tenure at Makerere University, Katende combined teaching with legal practice and academic writing. While preparing The Law of Business Associations in East and Central Africa, he worked with students who assisted with research and proofreading, including Amama Mbabazi and John Tucker Sentamu. Mbabazi later served as Prime Minister of Uganda, while Sentamu later became Archbishop of York and Primate of England.

During his academic career, Katende taught and supervised students who later joined the legal profession, public service, academia, and business sectors. Some of his former students later held senior positions in government, the judiciary, and public administration in Uganda and internationally.

Among those who later held senior public or judicial office are Rebecca Alitwala Kadaga, Bart Katureebe, Steven Kavuma, Sam Kutesa, Fredrick Ruhindi, Miria Matembe, Khiddu Makubuya, and Medi Kaggwa. Others include members of the judiciary such as Amos Twinomujuni, Remmy Kasule, Augustine Nshimye, Stella Arach-Amoko, Moses Mukiibi, IIbanda Nahamya, Edmund Sempa Lugayizi, Vincent Kibuuka Musoke, Albert Rugadya Atwoki, Margaret Oguli Oumo, Ralph Ochan, and Constance Byamugisha.

Some of his former students also later held senior roles in legal practice and public institutions, including Elly Karuhanga, Peter Kabatsi, and Andrew Kasirye. Others later served in national security and public administration roles, including Martin Okoth Ochola and Kale Kayihura. Elijah Wante later served as Director of the Law Development Centre.
