= Lyantonde General Hospital =

- Uganda Ministry of Health

Geography
- Location: Lyantonde, Lyantonde District, Central Region, Uganda
- Coordinates: 00°23′56″S 31°09′13″E

Organisation
- Care system: Public
- Type: General

Services
- Emergency department: I
- Beds: 100

History
- Founded: 2011

Links
- Other links: Hospitals in Uganda

Lyantonde General Hospital, also Lyantonde District Hospital or Lyantonde Government Hospital, is a hospital in the Central Region of Uganda.

== Location ==
The hospital is off of the Masaka-Mbarara Road, in the town of Lyantonde in Lyantonde District, approximately 67.5 kilometres (42 mi), by road, east of Mbarara Regional Referral Hospital. This is about 73 kilometres (45 mi) west of Masaka Regional Referral Hospital. The coordinates of Lyantonde General Hospital are 0°23'56.0"S, 31°09'13.0"E (Latitude:-0.398889; Longitude:31.153611).

== Overview ==
Before 2011, Lyantonde General Hospital was a Health Centre IV. In 2011, the health center was elevated to a full hospital. Lyantonde General Hospital is on the list of general hospitals earmarked for renovation and expansion.

== See also ==
- List of hospitals in Uganda
