= Liquid fuel =

Liquids that can be used to create energy

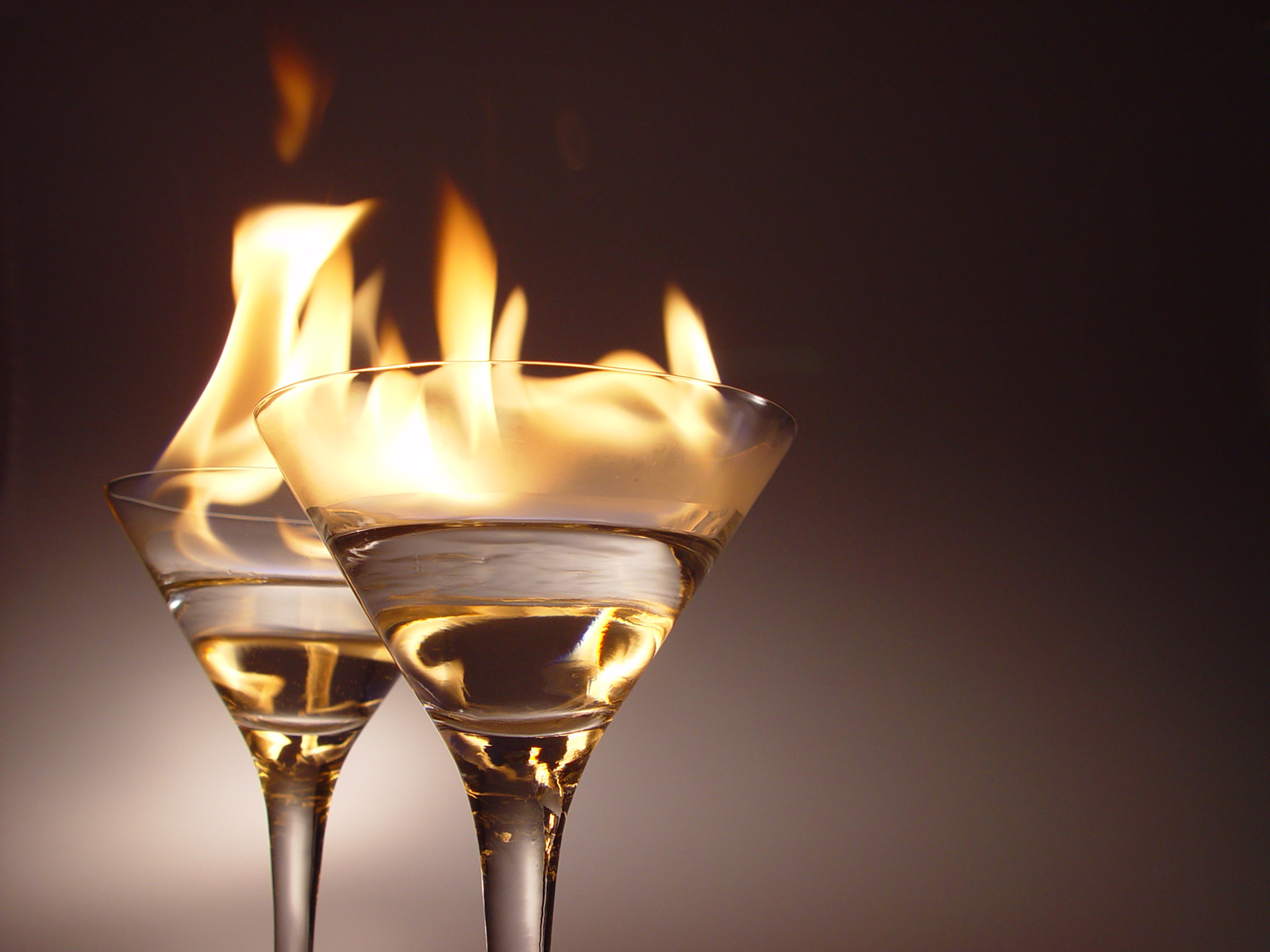
A flaming cocktail works by burning ethanol (grain alcohol), a type of liquid fuel also found in all alcoholic drinks

Liquid fuels are combustible or energy-generating molecules that can be harnessed to create mechanical energy, usually producing kinetic energy; they also must take the shape of their container. It is the fumes of liquid fuels that are flammable instead of the fluid. Most liquid fuels in widespread use are derived from fossil fuels; however, there are several types, such as hydrogen fuel (for automotive uses), ethanol, and biodiesel, which are also categorized as a liquid fuel. Many liquid fuels play a primary role in transportation and the economy.

Liquid fuels are contrasted with solid fuels and gaseous fuels.

== General properties ==
Some common properties of liquid fuels are that they are easy to transport, and can be handled with relative ease. Physical properties of liquid fuels vary by temperature, though not as greatly as for gaseous fuels. Some of these properties are: flash point, the lowest temperature at which a flammable concentration of vapor is produced; fire point, the temperature at which sustained burning of vapor will occur; cloud point for diesel fuels, the temperature at which dissolved waxy compounds begin to coalesce, and pour point, the temperature below which the fuel is too thick to pour freely. These properties affect the safety and handling of the fuel.

== Petroleum fuels ==
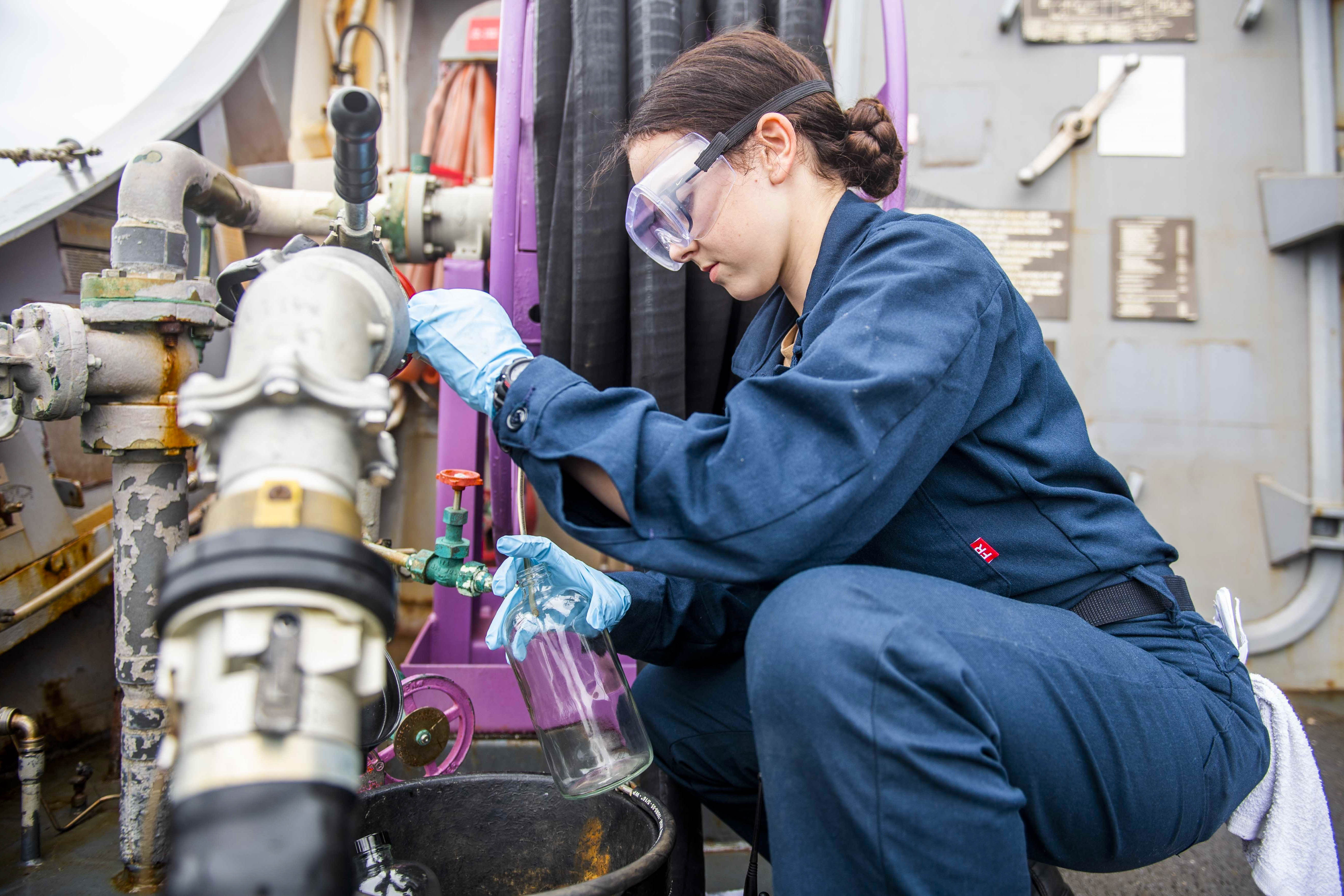
A worker collecting fuel samples for testing aboard a ship

Most liquid fuels used currently are produced from petroleum. The most notable of these is gasoline. Scientists generally accept that petroleum formed from the fossilized remains of dead plants and animals by exposure to heat and pressure in the Earth's crust.

=== Gasoline ===
Gasoline is the most widely used liquid fuel. Gasoline, as it is known in United States and Canada, or petrol elsewhere, is made of hydrocarbon molecules (compounds that contain hydrogen and carbon only) forming aliphatic compounds, or chains of carbons with hydrogen atoms attached. However, many aromatic compounds (carbon chains forming rings) such as benzene are found naturally in gasoline and cause the health risks associated with prolonged exposure to the fuel.

Production of gasoline is achieved by distillation of crude oil. The desirable liquid is separated from the crude oil in refineries. Crude oil is extracted from the ground in several processes, the most commonly seen may be beam pumps. To create gasoline, petroleum must first be removed from crude oil.

Liquid gasoline itself is not actually burned, but its fumes ignite, causing the remaining liquid to evaporate and then burn. Gasoline is extremely volatile and easily combusts, making any leakage potentially extremely dangerous. Gasoline sold in most countries carries a published octane rating. The octane number is an empirical measure of the resistance of gasoline to combusting prematurely, known as knocking. The higher the octane rating, the more resistant the fuel is to autoignition under high pressures, which allows for a higher compression ratio. Engines with a higher compression ratio, commonly used in race cars and high-performance regular-production automobiles, can produce more power; however, such engines require a higher octane fuel. Increasing the octane rating has, in the past, been achieved by adding "anti-knock" additives such as tetra-ethyl lead (TEL or just "lead") or methyl tert-butyl ether (MTBE), but due to the environmental impacts of such additives (most notably TEL), these additives are becoming less and less common, banned by local law, and replaced by more-environmentally-friendly alternatives or more intense refinery processing.

=== Diesel ===
Conventional diesel is similar to gasoline in that it is a mixture of aliphatic hydrocarbons extracted from petroleum. Diesel may cost more or less than gasoline, but generally costs less to produce because the extraction processes used are simpler. Some countries (particularly Canada, India and Italy) also have lower tax rates on diesel fuels.

After distillation, the diesel fraction is normally processed to reduce the amount of sulfur in the fuel. Sulfur causes corrosion in vehicles, acid rain and higher emissions of soot from the tail pipe (exhaust pipe). Historically, in Europe lower sulfur levels than in the United States were legally required. However, recent US legislation reduced the maximum sulfur content of diesel from 3,000 ppm to 500 ppm in 2007, and 15 ppm by 2010. Similar changes are also underway in Canada, Australia, New Zealand and several Asian countries. See also Ultra-low-sulfur diesel.

A diesel engine is a type of internal combustion engine which ignites fuel by injecting it into a combustion chamber previously compressed with air (which in turn raises the temperature) as opposed to using an outside ignition source, such as a spark plug.

=== Kerosene ===
Kerosene (also called "paraffin" or "lamp oil") is used in kerosene lamps and as a fuel for cooking, heating, and small engines. It displaced whale oil for lighting use. Jet fuel for jet engines is made in several grades (Avtur, Jet A, Jet A-1, Jet B, JP-4, JP-5, JP-7 or JP-8) that are kerosene-type mixtures. One form of the fuel, known as RP-1, is burned with liquid oxygen as rocket fuel. These fuel grade kerosenes meet specifications for smoke points and freeze points.

In the mid-20th century, kerosene or a blend of kerosene and aromatics known as "tractor vaporising oil" (TVO) or "power kerosene" was used as a cheap fuel for tractors utilizing low-compression petrol-paraffin engines. The engine would start on gasoline, then switch over to kerosene (or TVO) once the engine warmed up. A "heat valve" on the manifold would route the exhaust gases around the intake pipe, heating the kerosene to the point where it can be ignited by an electric spark.

Kerosene is sometimes used as an additive in diesel fuel to prevent gelling or waxing in cold temperatures. However, this is not advisable in some recent vehicle diesel engines, as doing so may interfere with the engine's emissions regulation equipment.

=== Liquefied petroleum gas (LPG) ===
LP gas is a mixture of propane and butane, both of which are easily compressible gases under standard atmospheric conditions. It offers many of the advantages of compressed natural gas (CNG), but does not burn as cleanly, is denser than air and is much more easily compressed. Commonly used for cooking and space heating, LP gas and compressed propane are seeing increased use in motorized vehicles; propane is the third most commonly used motor fuel globally.

=== Carbon dioxide formation from petroleum fuels ===
Petroleum fuels, when burnt, release carbon dioxide that is necessary for plant growth, but which (given the large scale of global emissions) is potentially harmful to world climate. The amount of carbon dioxide released when one liter of fuel is combusted can be estimated: As a good approximation the chemical formula of e.g. diesel is C_{n}H_{2n}. Note that diesel is a mixture of different molecules. As carbon has a molar mass of 12 g/mol and hydrogen (atomic) has a molar mass of about 1 g/mol, so the fraction by weight of carbon in diesel is roughly 12/14. The reaction of diesel combustion is given by:

2C_{n}H_{2n} + 3nO_{2} ⇌ 2nCO_{2} + 2nH_{2}O

Carbon dioxide has a molar mass of 44g/mol as it consists of 2 atoms of oxygen (16 g/mol) and 1 atom of carbon (12 g/mol). So 12 g of carbon yield 44 g of Carbon dioxide. Diesel has a density of 0.838 kg per liter. Putting everything together the mass of carbon dioxide that is produced by burning 1 liter of diesel can be calculated as:

$0.838 kg/L \cdot {\frac{12}{14}}\cdot {\frac{44}{12}}= 2.63 kg/L$

The number of 2.63 kg of carbon dioxide from 1 liter of Diesel is close to the values found in the literature.

For gasoline, with a density of 0.75 kg/L and a ratio of carbon to hydrogen atoms of about 6 to 14, the estimated value of carbon emission if 1 liter of gasoline is burnt gives:

$0.75 kg/L \cdot {\frac{6 \cdot 12}{6\cdot 12 + 14}\cdot 1} \cdot {\frac{44}{12}}= 2.3 kg/L$

== Non-petroleum fossil fuels ==
When petroleum is not easily available, chemical processes such as the Fischer–Tropsch process can be used to produce liquid fuels from coal or natural gas. Synthetic fuels from coal were strategically important during World War II for the German military. Today synthetic fuels produced from natural gas are manufactured, to take advantage of the higher value of liquid fuels in transportation.

== Liquefied natural gas ==
Natural gas, composed chiefly of methane, can be compressed to a liquid and used as a substitute for other traditional liquid fuels. Its combustion is very clean compared to other hydrocarbon fuels, but the fuel's low boiling point requires the fuel to be kept at high pressures to keep it in the liquid state. Though it has a much lower flash point than fuels such as gasoline, it is in many ways safer due to its higher autoignition temperature and its low density, which causes it to dissipate when released in air.

== Biodiesel ==
Biodiesel is similar to diesel but has differences akin to those between petrol and ethanol. For instance, biodiesel has a higher cetane rating (45-60 compared to 45-50 for crude-oil-derived diesel) and it acts as a cleaning agent to get rid of dirt and deposits. It has been argued that it only becomes economically feasible above oil prices of $80 (£40 or €60 as of late February, 2007) per barrel. This does, however, depend on locality, economic situation, government stance on biodiesel and a host of other factors- and it has been proven to be viable at much lower costs in some countries. Also, it yields about 10% less energy than ordinary diesel. Analogous to the use of higher compression ratios used for engines burning higher octane alcohols and petrol in spark-ignition engines, taking advantage of biodiesel's high cetane rating can potentially overcome the energy deficit compared to ordinary Number 2 diesel.

== Alcohols ==
Generally, the term alcohol refers to ethanol, the first organic chemical produced by humans, but any alcohol can be burned as a fuel. Ethanol and methanol are the most common, being sufficiently inexpensive to be useful.

=== Methanol ===
Methanol is the lightest and simplest alcohol, produced from the natural gas component methane. Its application is limited primarily due to its toxicity (similar to gasoline), but also due to its high corrosivity and miscibility with water. Small amounts are used in some types of gasoline to increase the octane rating. Methanol-based fuels are used in some race cars and model aeroplanes.

Methanol is also called methyl alcohol or wood alcohol, the latter because it was formerly produced from the distillation of wood. It is also known by the name methyl hydrate.

=== Ethanol ===
Ethanol, also known as grain alcohol or ethyl alcohol, is commonly found in alcoholic beverages. However, it may also be used as a fuel, most often in combination with gasoline. For the most part, it is used in a 9:1 ratio of gasoline to ethanol to reduce the negative environmental effects of gasoline.

There is increasing interest in the use of a blend of 85% fuel ethanol blended with 15% gasoline. This fuel blend called E85 has a higher fuel octane than most premium types of gasoline. When used in a modern Flexible fuel vehicle, it delivers more performance to the gasoline it replaces at the expense of higher fuel consumption due to ethanol's lesser specific energy content.

Ethanol for use in gasoline and industrial purposes may be considered a fossil fuel because it is often synthesized from the petroleum product ethylene, which is cheaper than production from fermentation of grains or sugarcane.

=== Butanol ===
Butanol is an alcohol which can be used as a fuel in most gasoline internal combustion engines without engine modification. It is typically a product of the fermentation of biomass by the bacterium Clostridium acetobutylicum (also known as the Weizmann organism). This process was first delineated by Chaim Weizmann in 1916 for the production of acetone from starch for making cordite, a smokeless gunpowder.

The advantages of butanol are its high octane rating (over 100) and high energy content, only about 10% lower than gasoline, and subsequently about 50% more energy-dense than ethanol, 100% more so than methanol. Butanol's only major disadvantages are its high flashpoint (35 °C or 95 °F), toxicity (note that toxicity levels exist but are not precisely confirmed), and the fact that the fermentation process for renewable butanol emits a foul odour. The Weizmann organism can only tolerate butanol levels up to 2% or so, compared to 14% for ethanol and yeast. Making butanol from oil produces no such odour, but the limited supply and environmental impact of oil usage defeat the purpose of alternative fuels. The cost of butanol is about $1.25–$1.32 per kilogram ($0.57-$0.58 per pound or $4 approx. per US gallon). Butanol is much more expensive than ethanol (approximately $0.40 per litre or 1.50 per gallon) and methanol.

On June 20, 2006, DuPont and BP announced that they were converting an existing ethanol plant to produce 9 million gallons (34 000 cubic meters) of butanol per year from sugar beets. DuPont stated a goal of being competitive with oil at $30–$40 per barrel ($0.19-$0.25 per liter) without subsidies, so the price gap with ethanol is narrowing.

== Hydrogen ==
Liquefied hydrogen is the liquid state of the element hydrogen. It is a common liquid rocket fuel for rocket applications and can be used as a fuel in an internal combustion engine or fuel cell. Various concept hydrogen vehicles have been lower volumetric energy, the hydrogen volumes needed for combustion are large. Hydrogen was liquefied for the first time by James Dewar in 1898.

== Ammonia ==
Ammonia (NH_{3}) has been used as a fuel before at times when gasoline is unavailable (e.g. for buses in Belgium during WWII). It has a volumetric energy density of 17 Megajoules per liter (compared to 10 for hydrogen, 18 for methanol, 21 for dimethyl ether and 34 for gasoline). It must be compressed or cooled to be a liquid fuel, although it does not require cryogenic cooling as hydrogen does to be liquefied.
