= Andrew Felix Kaweesi =

Ugandan Policeman (1974–2017)

- Born: 28 January 1974; Uganda
- Died: 17 March 2017 (aged 43); Kulambiro, Nakawa in Kampala, Uganda
- Cause of death: Assassination
- Education: Makerere University
- Occupations: Military officer, policeman
- Years active: 1974–2017
- Title: Spokesperson of Police since August 2016; Uganda National Police
- Spouse: Annet Kaweesi

Andrew Felix Kaweesi was a Ugandan police officer who served as an Assistant Inspector General of Police and as spokesperson of the Uganda Police force from August 2016 until his assassination in March 2017. He died at the rank of a Major General (equivalent NATO code OF-7). Kaweesi joined the police during the 2001 police intake and was the first to die among that intake. In 2016, Kaweesi was appointed by the Inspector General of Police (Kale Kayihura) to be the head of the Police's public relations department.

== Background ==
Kaweesi was born in Kyazanga, Lwengo district. His parents (Esther and Alfonse Mutabazi) passed on during his childhood and this left him and his siblings in the hands of his relatives. Kaweesi's parents left for them 640 acres of land in Kitwekyagonja village in Lwengo district. Later on, Kaweesi mobilised his siblings to put up a structure on that land. He then married Annet Kaweesi who he had with five children. Their fifth child was born the day after Kaweesi's burial. This child was named after Kaweesi in remembrance of his father.

== Formal education ==
Kaweesi attended primary school at St. Jude primary school from 1982 to 1989. He joined St. Benard college school, Kiswera for his O'level education and he finished his A'level education at Kitante High school from 1994–1996. Kaweesi studied Bachelors of Arts in Education for the undergraduate level at Makerere University from 1996 to 1999. He later proceeded for masters at Nkumba University and the University of Nairobi where he studied Masters of Education Planning and Management and Masters of International Studies respectively.

== Public service ==
- 1997–1999: Chairman at Makerere Private Students Association (MUPSA)
- 1999: Director of Studies and teacher at St. Benard's College school Kiswera.
- 2000: Personal Assistant to the District Local Government Chairperson Masaka.
- 2001: Cadet leader Police Training School Kibuli.
- 2002–2003: Officer in charge station Ntungamo District police.
- Feb-May 2004: Police Consultant for Southern Sudan under the Department for International Development (DFID) Fund.
- 2004–2005: Deputy Commandant police training school Masindi.
- 2005: Police training consultant for amor Police Academy Somalia.
- 2006–2009: Personal Assistant to the Inspector General of police.
- 2007–2010: Commandant Police Training School Kabalye.
- 2009: Commandant Police Training School Kabalye.
- September 2014: Director of Operations Uganda Police Force.
- 2015 to 2017: Director of Human Resource Development/Spokesperson Uganda Police Force

== Management and leadership courses attended ==
- Attended Police Officer Cadet Course 2001: Police training school Kibuli.
- Managing the Training Functions: June 2003 South Africa.
- Instructional Techniques Course: Oct 2003 Police training school Masindi.
- Supervisory skills 2004 Makerere University Business School.
- Facilitation of learning, Design and Development Course: 2008 person peacekeeping Centre- Cairo Egypt.
- Executive Police Development Course 2009: Interpol Lyon France.
- Strategic security studies Course 2010–2011: National Defense College Nairobi.
- Law enforcement supervisor Course 2012: International Law Enforcement Academy.
- Management of national security 2015: Galilee International Management Institute.

== Assassination ==
Kaweesi was assassinated in the morning of 17 March 2017 when he was leaving his home for duty. He was travelling with one of his bodyguards, Kenneth Erau, and the driver, Geoffrey Wambewo, were also killed about 100 metres from Kaweesi's front gate. The post-mortem at Mulago National Referral Hospital found that Kaweesi was shot 27 times, his bodyguard, Kenneth Erau, 33 times while his driver, Geoffrey Wambewo, was shot 11 times. The police vehicle in which the three were travelling was found to have 77 bullet holes. According to eyewitnesses, two attackers riding motorcycles came from behind, passed by and turned back, while stopping front of and then shooting the unarmoured police vehicle. Kaweesi's driver tried to increase the speed but he was overpowered by the motorbikes. Uganda has been facing assassinations with the same mode since November 2016. An example being an army officer Major Sulaiman Kiggundu who was shot dead in his car by gunmen on two motorcycles. Two days before his death, Kaweesi confided in a priest about the message he received on phone threatening his life. The message was from an unregistered number. Twenty-two people were arrested as suspects.

== Burial ==
Kaweesi was buried in his ancestral home in Kyazanga, Lwengo district on Tuesday, 21 March. Prior to that, Kaweesi's body was taken to St. Andrew's Church, Kulambiro, Ntinda, Kampala on Sunday, 19 March, for prayers at 3:00 pm. And the vigil was held at his home, Kulambiro. Also, a mass at Rubaga Cathedral was held on Monday, 20 March for Kaweesi.

== See also ==
- Uganda National Police
- List of military schools in Uganda
- Notable alumni, Makerere University
