= Kyazanga =

- Map of Uganda showing the location of Kyazanga
- Coordinates: 00°23′11″S 31°19′07″E
- Country: Uganda
- Region: Central Region of Uganda
- District: Lwengo District
- Elevation: 1,300 m (4,300 ft)

Population (2014 Census)
  - Total: 15,531
- Time zone: UTC+3 (EAT)

Kyazanga is a town council in the Lwengo District of the Central Region of Uganda.

== Location ==
Kyazanga is approximately 48 kilometres (30 mi), by road, west of Masaka on the all-weather highway between Masaka and Mbarara. The coordinates of the town are 0°23'11.0"S, 31°19'07.0"E (Latitude:-0.386389; Longitude:31.318611).

== Climate ==
The Köppen-Geiger climate classification system classifies its climate as tropical wet and dry (As).

Climate data for Kyazanga (altitude: 1300m)
Month	Jan	Feb	Mar	Apr	May	Jun	Jul	Aug	Sep	Oct	Nov	Dec	Year
Mean daily maximum °C (°F)	27.5 (81.5)	27.6 (81.7)	27.1 (80.8)	26.1 (79.0)	25.6 (78.1)	26.1 (79.0)	26.3 (79.3)	26.3 (79.3)	26.6 (79.9)	26.4 (79.5)	26 (79)	26.4 (79.5)	26.5 (79.7)
Daily mean °C (°F)	21.2 (70.2)	21.4 (70.5)	21.3 (70.3)	20.8 (69.4)	20.3 (68.5)	20.1 (68.2)	19.9 (67.8)	20.1 (68.2)	20.6 (69.1)	20.7 (69.3)	20.6 (69.1)	20.6 (69.1)	20.6 (69.1)
Mean daily minimum °C (°F)	14.9 (58.8)	15.2 (59.4)	15.5 (59.9)	15.6 (60.1)	15.1 (59.2)	14.1 (57.4)	13.5 (56.3)	14 (57)	14.6 (58.3)	15.1 (59.2)	15.3 (59.5)	14.8 (58.6)	14.8 (58.6)
Average precipitation mm (inches)	48 (1.9)	52 (2.0)	97 (3.8)	124 (4.9)	90 (3.5)	20 (0.8)	18 (0.7)	49 (1.9)	81 (3.2)	93 (3.7)	106 (4.2)	69 (2.7)	847 (33.3)
Source: Climate-Data.org

Climate data for Kyazanga (altitude: 1241m)
Month	Jan	Feb	Mar	Apr	May	Jun	Jul	Aug	Sep	Oct	Nov	Dec	Year
Mean daily maximum °C (°F)	27.7 (81.9)	27.9 (82.2)	27.4 (81.3)	26.5 (79.7)	26 (79)	26.4 (79.5)	26.7 (80.1)	26.7 (80.1)	26.9 (80.4)	26.8 (80.2)	26.3 (79.3)	26.7 (80.1)	26.8 (80.3)
Daily mean °C (°F)	21.3 (70.3)	21.6 (70.9)	21.5 (70.7)	21.2 (70.2)	20.6 (69.1)	20.3 (68.5)	20.2 (68.4)	20.4 (68.7)	20.8 (69.4)	21.1 (70.0)	20.9 (69.6)	20.9 (69.6)	20.9 (69.6)
Mean daily minimum °C (°F)	15 (59)	15.4 (59.7)	15.7 (60.3)	15.9 (60.6)	15.3 (59.5)	14.3 (57.7)	13.7 (56.7)	14.2 (57.6)	14.8 (58.6)	15.4 (59.7)	15.6 (60.1)	15.1 (59.2)	15.0 (59.1)
Average precipitation mm (inches)	48 (1.9)	53 (2.1)	96 (3.8)	123 (4.8)	89 (3.5)	19 (0.7)	18 (0.7)	48 (1.9)	81 (3.2)	92 (3.6)	105 (4.1)	68 (2.7)	840 (33)
Source: Climate-Data.org

== Population ==
The 2014 national population census put he population of Kyazanga at 15,531.

== Points of interest ==
The following additional points of interest lie within the town limits or near its edges:

- offices of Kyazanga Town Council
- Kyazanga central market (Includes Kyazanga Farmers' Cooperative Society Ltd).
- Masaka-Mbarara Highway, passing through the center of the town, in an east to west direction.

== See also ==
- Lwengo
- Districts of Uganda
- List of cities and towns in Uganda
