= Manoir Energy =

Estonian fuel company

Manoir Energy OÜ is Estonian limited-liability company which deals with wholesale of solid, liquid and gas fuels.

The company was established in 2010.

As of 2019, by revenue of 423.1 million euros, the company is 6th in Estonia.
