= Twinomujuni =

Twinomujuni is a surname. Notable people with the surname include:

- Amos Twinomujuni, Ugandan judge
- Johnson Twinomujuni, Ugandan bishop
