= Total value =

Total value may refer to:

- Total economic value
- Total philosophic value
- Total value of ownership (TVO)
