= James Kakooza =

Ugandan politician

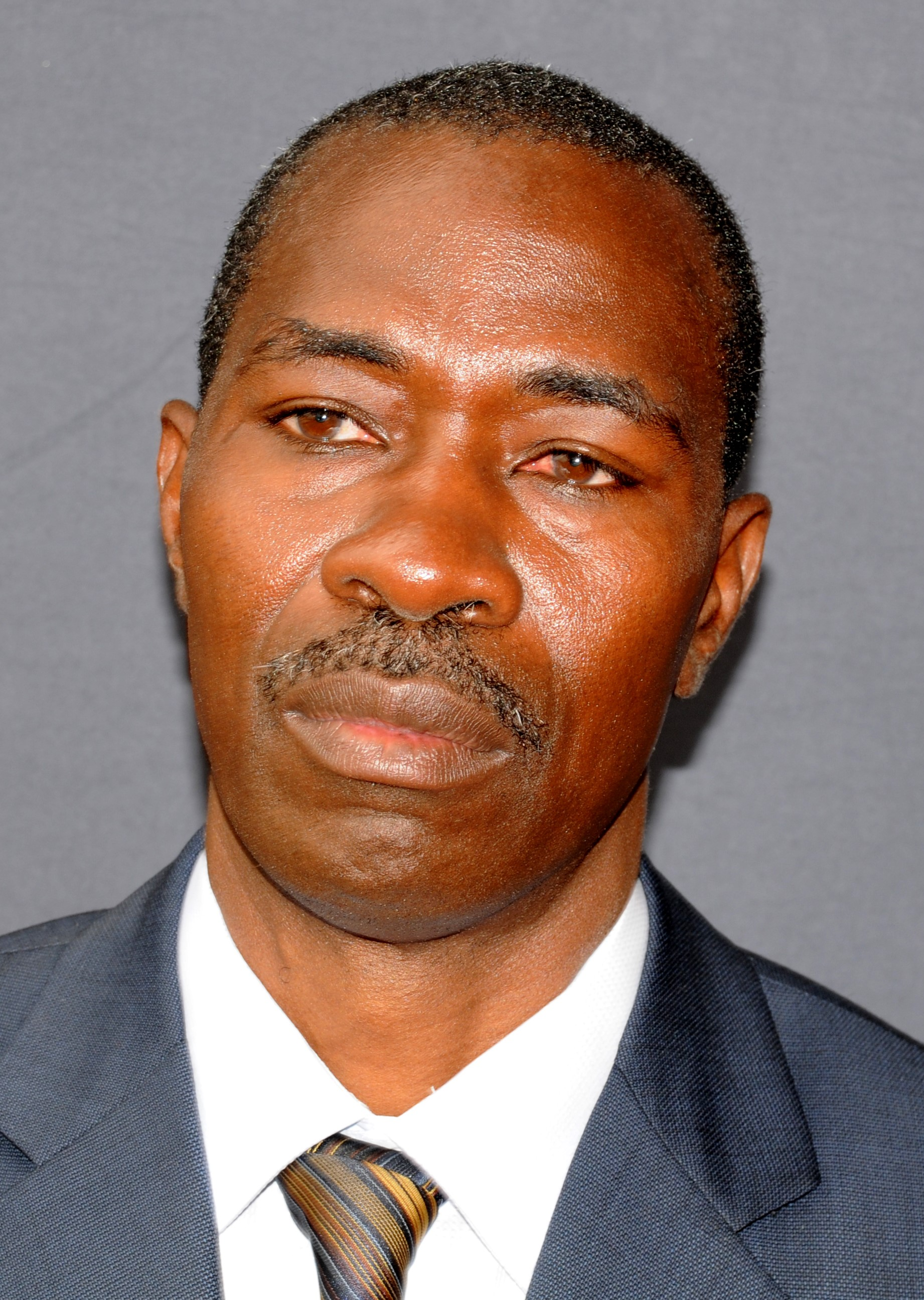
- Born: 18 February 1962 (age 64); Uganda
- Citizenship: Uganda
- Education: BBA (Business Administration); Nkumba University, Entebbe, Uganda; Certified Public Accountant (CPA); Kenya
- Occupations: Accountant and politician
- Years active: 1989 — present
- Known for: Politics

James Kakooza is a Ugandan accountant and politician. He has served as State Minister for Health (Primary Care) in Uganda since 2009. He is also the Member of Parliament representing Kabula County, Lyantonde District, in the Ugandan Parliament. He has served in that position from 2001 to 2016. In 2021, James Kakooza was elected to represent Uganda to the East African Legislative Assembly (EALA) replacing Mathias Kasamba

== Background ==
He was born on 18 February 1962, in Lyantonde District.

== Education ==
He holds the degree of Bachelor of Business Administration (BBA) from Nkumba University. He also holds the Diploma in Clearing & Forwarding, as well as the Certificate in Customs Basics & Tax Administration awarded by the Uganda Revenue Authority. He has certification recognizing him as a Certified Public Accountant in Kenya.

== Work experience ==
His varied career has seen James Kakooza work in several different private and public positions, over the course of the last twenty years. Between 1989 and 1990, he worked as an Accounts Officer at Karibu Forex Bureau, one of the more than 100 Foreign Exchange Bureaus in Kampala. Between 1991 and 1992, he worked as a Banking Officer in Sembule Bank, the precursor of present-day Bank of Africa. He left the bank and worked as a Clearing and Forwarding Agent from 1992 until 2001. Between 1994 until 2001, he served as the Business Director for Kabale Distributors Limited, a Ugandan Import/Export company. He has also served as a Director of the Uganda Importers and Exporters Traders Association, an industry association. In 2001, he entered politics and was elected to the Ugandan Parliament to represent Kabula County, Lyantonde District. He was re-elected to the same position in 2006. He was appointed State Minister for Health (Primary Care) on 16 February 2009.

== Other responsibilities ==
James Kakooza is a member of the Parliamentary Committee on Commissions, Statutory Authorities and State Enterprises.

== Personal information ==
He is married. He belongs to the National Resistance Movement political party.

== See also ==
- Parliament of Uganda
- Cabinet of Uganda
- Lyantonde District
