= Tom Voltaire Okwalinga =

Ugandan social media personality

Tom Voltaire Okwalinga also known as TVO is an anonymous Ugandan and famous social media critique of the Uganda's government. He has been leaking a series of the Uganda's government secrets through his Facebook account for which he has over 120,000 followers.

In April 2014, he posted a secret tape that implicated the Inspector General of Police (IGP) of the Uganda Police Force then, Kale Kayihura’s attempt to investigate and curtail Amama Mbabazi’s underneath campaign to oust President Museveni in the 2016 presidential elections.

No one knows the true identity of TVO including his many followers and Facebook refused to reveal his identity to the Uganda government.

== The search ==
The government of Uganda set out to search for the masked unknown social media blogger in vain. While he continued to unleash government related information, government ran to court to compel Facebook to reveal the identity of the man who proved to be a headache to them.

In a turn of events, it was revealed that TVO's Facebook account was run by 3 Ugandans not just one person. In another complicated twist of events, TVO had a 5 month engagement with Voice of America which intrigued Ugandan authorities.

== See also ==
- Freedom of the press in Uganda
- Kale Kayihura
- Amama Mbabazi
- Social media in Uganda
- Voice of America
- Yoweri Kaguta Museveni
