= Lyantonde =

- Map of Uganda showing the location of Lyantonde.
- Coordinates: 00°24′25″S 31°09′27″E
- Country: Uganda
- Region: Central Region of Uganda
- District: Lyantonde District
- Elevation: 1,336 m (4,383 ft)

Population (2020 Estimate)
  - Total: 16,300
- Time zone: UTC+3 (EAT)

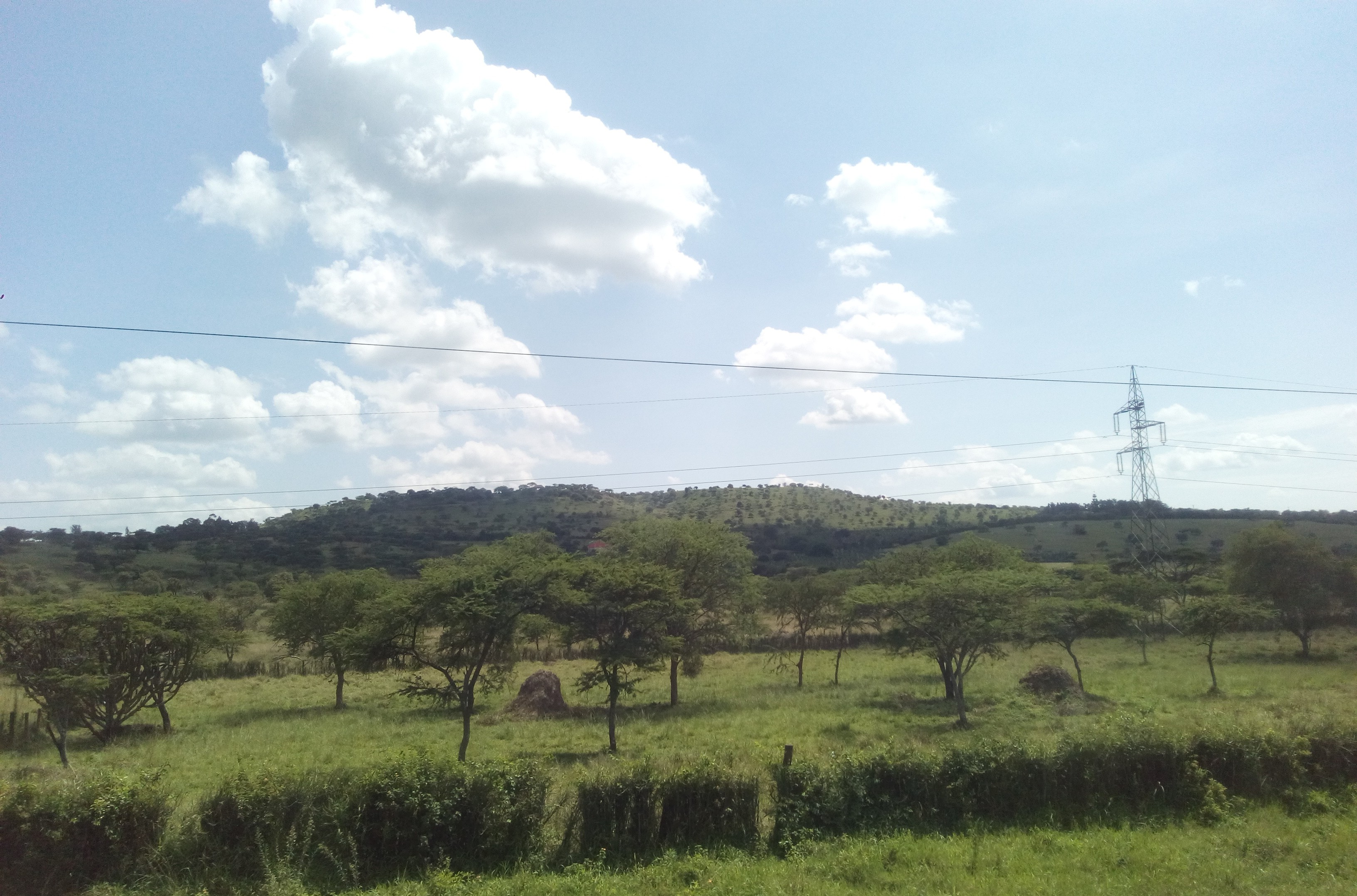
Grazing land in Lyantonde

Lyantonde is a town in the southern part of the Central Region of Uganda. It is the main municipal, administrative, and commercial center of Lyantonde District.

== Location ==
Lyantonde is approximately 74 kilometres (46 mi), by road, west of Masaka, the nearest large city, on the all-weather Masaka–Mbarara Road. It is approximately 203 kilometres (126 mi), by road, south-west of Kampala, the capital and largest city of Uganda. The coordinates of the town are 0°24'25.0"S, 31°09'27.0"E (Latitude:-0.406944; Longitude:31.157500). Lyantonde Town sits at an average elevation of 1,336 metres (4,383 ft) above mean sea level.

== Population ==
In 2002, the national population census estimated the population of the town to be 7,500. In 2010, the Uganda Bureau of Statistics (UBOS) estimated the population at 8,700. In 2011, UBOS estimated the mid-year population at 8,900. During the national census and household survey of 27 and 28 August 2014, the Uganda Bureau of Statistics (UBOS) enumerated the population of Lyantonde Town at 13,586 people.

In 2015 UBOS estimated the population of the town at 14,100. In 2020, the population agency estimated the mid-year population of Lyantonde Town at 16,300. Of these, 8,500 (52.1 percent) were female and 7,800 (47.9 percent) were male. UBOS calculated the growth rate of the town between 2015 until 2020 to average 2.9 percent annually.

Historical population
Year	Pop.	±%
2002	7,500	—
2010	8,700	+16.0%
2011	8,900	+2.3%
2014	13,586	+52.7%
2015	14,100	+3.8%
2020	16,300	+15.6%

== Overview ==
The town lies along the Masaka-Mbarara Road which connects to Kampala, Uganda's capital to the east and Kigali, the capital city of Rwanda to the southwest. Lyantonde serves as a stop-over for long-distance truck drivers plying this route. Although prostitution is illegal in Uganda, prostitutes are readily available in Lyantonde town.

== Points of interest ==
The following points of interest lie within the town limits or near the town edges: (a) The headquarters of Lyantonde District Administration (b) Lyantonde General Hospital, a 100-bed public hospital administered by the Uganda Ministry of Health (c) Offices of Lyantonde Town Council (d) Lyantonde central market (e) Masaka-Mbarara Road, which passes through the middle of town in a general east/west direction (f) Salaama Vocational Education Centre (SVEC).

== See also ==
- List of cities and towns in Uganda
