= Compression ratio =

Combustion chamber capacity ratio

In piston engines, static compression ratio is determined using the cylinder volume when the piston is at the top and bottom of its travel.

The compression ratio is the ratio between the maximum and minimum volume during the compression stage of the power cycle in a piston or Wankel engine. A fundamental specification for such engines, it can be measured in two different ways. The simpler way is the static compression ratio: in a reciprocating engine, this is the ratio of the volume of the cylinder when the piston is at the bottom of its stroke to that volume when the piston is at the top of its stroke. The dynamic compression ratio is a more advanced calculation which also takes into account gases entering and exiting the cylinder during the compression phase.

== Effect and typical ratios ==
A high compression ratio is desirable because it allows an engine to extract more mechanical energy from a given amount of fuel due to its higher thermal efficiency. This occurs because internal combustion engines are heat engines, and higher compression ratios allow more energy to be converted into useful work from the same amount of fuel, while giving a longer expansion cycle, creating more mechanical power output and potentially lowering exhaust gas temperatures.

=== Petrol engines ===
In petrol (gasoline) engines used in passenger cars for the past 20 years, compression ratios have typically been between 8:1 and 12:1. Several production engines have used higher compression ratios, including:

- Cars built from 1955 to 1972 which were designed for high-octane leaded gasoline, which allowed compression ratios up to 13:1.
- Some Mazda SkyActiv engines released since 2012 have compression ratios up to 16:1. The SkyActiv engine achieves this compression ratio with ordinary unleaded gasoline (95 RON in the United Kingdom) through improved scavenging of exhaust gases (which ensures cylinder temperature is as low as possible before the intake stroke), in addition to direct injection.
- Toyota Dynamic Force engine has a compression ratio up to 14:1.
- The 2014 Ferrari 458 Speciale also has a compression ratio of 14:1.

When forced induction (e.g. a turbocharger or supercharger) is used, the compression ratio is often lower than naturally aspirated engines. This is due to the turbocharger or supercharger already having compressed the air before it enters the cylinders. Engines using port fuel-injection typically run lower boost pressures and/or compression ratios than direct injected engines because port fuel injection causes the air–fuel mixture to be heated together, leading to detonation. Conversely, directly injected engines can run higher boost because heated air will not detonate without a fuel being present. Higher compression ratios can make gasoline (petrol) engines subject to engine knocking (also known as "detonation", "pre-ignition", or "pinging") if lower octane-rated fuel is used. This can reduce efficiency or damage the engine if knock sensors are not present to modify the ignition timing.

=== Diesel engine ===
Diesel engines use higher compression ratios than petrol engines, because the lack of a spark plug means that the compression ratio must increase the temperature of the air in the cylinder sufficiently to ignite the diesel using compression ignition. Compression ratios are often between 14:1 and 23:1 for direct injection diesel engines, and between 18:1 and 23:1 for indirect injection diesel engines. At the lower end of 14:1, NOx emissions are reduced at a cost of more difficult cold-start. Mazda's Skyactiv-D, the first such commercial engine from 2013, used adaptive fuel injectors among other techniques to ease cold start.

=== Other fuels ===
The compression ratio may be higher in engines running exclusively on liquefied petroleum gas (LPG or "propane autogas") or compressed natural gas, due to the higher octane rating of these fuels. Kerosene engines typically use a compression ratio of 6.5 or lower. The petrol-paraffin engine version of the Ferguson TE20 tractor had a compression ratio of 4.5:1 for operation on tractor vaporising oil with an octane rating between 55 and 70.

=== Motorsport engines ===
Motorsport engines often run on high-octane petrol and can therefore use higher compression ratios. For example, motorcycle racing engines can use compression ratios as high as 14.7:1, and it is common to find motorcycles with compression ratios above 12.0:1 designed for 95 or higher octane fuel. Ethanol and methanol can take significantly higher compression ratios than gasoline. Racing engines burning methanol and ethanol fuel often have a compression ratio of 14:1 to 16:1.

== Mathematical formula ==
In a reciprocating engine, the static compression ratio ($\mathrm{CR}$) is the ratio between the volume of the cylinder and combustion chamber when the piston is at the bottom of its stroke, and the volume of the combustion chamber when the piston is at the top of its stroke. It is therefore calculated by the formula
$$\mathrm{CR} = \frac { V_d + V_c} {V_c}$$

where

- $V_d$ is the displacement volume. This is the volume inside the cylinder displaced by the piston from the beginning of the compression stroke to the end of the stroke.
- $V_c$ is the clearance volume. This is the volume of the space in the cylinder left at the end of the compression stroke.

$V_d$ can be estimated by the cylinder volume formula:
$$V_d = \tfrac{\pi} {4} b^2 s$$

where

- $b$ is the cylinder bore (diameter)
- $s$ is the piston stroke length

Because of the complex shape of $V_c$ it is usually measured directly. This is often done by filling the cylinder with liquid and then measuring the volume of the used liquid.

== Variable compression ratio engines ==
Most engines use a fixed compression ratio, however a variable compression ratio engine is able to adjust the compression ratio while the engine is in operation. The first production engine with a variable compression ratio was introduced in 2019. Variable compression ratio is a technology to adjust the compression ratio of an internal combustion engine while the engine is in operation. This is done to increase fuel efficiency while under varying loads. Variable compression engines allow the volume above the piston at top dead centre to be changed. Higher loads require lower ratios to increase power, while lower loads need higher ratios to increase efficiency, i.e. to lower fuel consumption. For automotive use this needs to be done as the engine is running in response to the load and driving demands. The 2019 Infiniti QX50 is the first commercially available car that uses a variable compression ratio engine.

== Dynamic compression ratio ==
The static compression ratio discussed above — calculated solely based on the cylinder and combustion chamber volumes — does not take into account any gases entering or exiting the cylinder during the compression phase. In most automotive engines, the intake valve closure (which seals the cylinder) takes place during the compression phase (i.e. after bottom dead centre, BDC), which can cause some of the gases to be pushed back out through the intake valve. On the other hand, intake port tuning and scavenging can cause a greater amount of gas to be trapped in the cylinder than the static volume would suggest. The dynamic compression ratio accounts for these factors.

The dynamic compression ratio is higher with more conservative intake camshaft timing (i.e. valve closure soon after BDC), and lower with more radical intake camshaft timing (i.e. valve closure later after BDC). The dynamic compression ratio is usually lower than the static compression ratio, but not always. Under certain conditions, the inertia of the air flowing in the inlet tract can force additional air into the cylinder even after the piston has started to rise on the compression stroke. Thus the cylinder can be "supercharged" with air - typically up to around 10% more air than that arising from the geometry of the cylinder alone. This can also be expressed as a volumetric efficiency of 110%. This phenomenon is known as inertial ram supercharging and relies on careful tuning of the length of the inlet tract. There is a similar effect created by sonic pressure waves moving back and forth along the inlet tract, reflecting off the back of the intake valve and the open end of the inlet tract. When a positive pressure wave arrives at the valve just as it is closing, additional air can be forced into the cylinder. This is known as sonic ram supercharging. Inertial and sonic ram supercharging operate over a limited range of engine speeds, but can be used to fine tune the engine's torque or power curves. Absolute cylinder pressure is used to calculate the dynamic compression ratio, using the following formula:
$$P_\text{cylinder} = P_\text{atmospheric} \times \text{CR}^\gamma$$
where $\gamma$ is a polytropic value for the ratio of specific heats for the combustion gases at the temperatures present (this compensates for the temperature rise caused by compression, as well as heat lost to the cylinder)

Under ideal (adiabatic) conditions, the ratio of specific heats would be 1.4, but a lower value, generally between 1.2 and 1.3 is used, since the amount of heat lost will vary among engines based on design, size and materials used. For example, if the static compression ratio is 10:1, and the dynamic compression ratio is 7.5:1, a useful value for cylinder pressure would be 7.5^{1.3} × atmospheric pressure, or 13.7 bar (relative to atmospheric pressure). The two corrections for dynamic compression ratio affect cylinder pressure in opposite directions, but not in equal strength. An engine with high static compression ratio and late intake valve closure will have a dynamic compression ratio similar to an engine with lower compression but earlier intake valve closure.

== See also ==
- Mean effective pressure
