= Kerosene =

Combustible hydrocarbon liquid

Names
- IUPAC name Kerosine (petroleum)
- Other names Kerosine (petroleum), Kerosine, Shell 140, Fuels, Ink oil, AF 100 (pesticide), Avtur, Odorless Solvent 3440, Pegasol 3040, Bayol 35, Exxsol D 200/240, Escaid 110, Neochiozol, Escaid 100, Shellsol 2046, Bitumen Cutter, Nysolvin 75A, SX 7, SX 12, KO 30 (solvent), Parasol, P 878, Kedrul 212, Conoco 170E, Chiotekku SH, Chiotekku, Finalan 75, Deotomisol S, Solbrax Eco 255/285, Eneos Kerosene, RP 3, RP 3 (solvent), W-Kerosene, Magisol 52, Ketrul 211, TS 1 (petroleum), JP-A 1, Kixxol, Muplilkill, Kerosin, D 110, MSGS 60, HC 50 (solvent), HC 50, JP 7 (kerosene), JP 7, MeSH ID: D007648

Identifiers
CAS Number	8008-20-6
3D model (JSmol)	Interactive image
ECHA InfoCard	100.029.422
EC Number	232-366-4
UNII	1C89KKC04E
CompTox Dashboard (EPA)	DTXSID6027684
- SMILES: CCCCCCCCCCCCCCC.CCCCCCCCCC1CCCCC1.CCCCCCCCCC1=CC=CC=C1.CCC1CCCC(CC2=CC=CC=C2)C1.CCC1(CC2CCCCC2)CCCCC1.CCCCCCCCCCCCC(C)CC.CCCCCCCCCCCC(C)(C)CC.CCCCC(CC)(CC(C)C)C(CC)CC

Properties
Density	~0.80 g/cm³ (approx)
Melting point	20 °C (68 °F)
Boiling point	175–325 °C (347–617 °F)
- Except where otherwise noted, data are given for materials in their standard state (at 25 °C [77 °F], 100 kPa). Infobox references

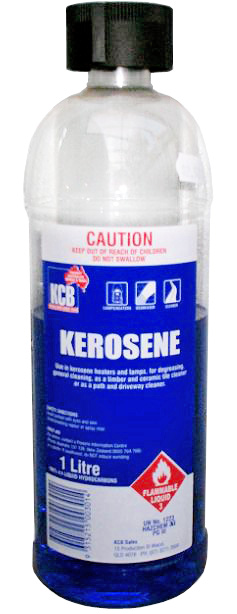
A kerosene bottle, containing blue-dyed kerosene

Kerosene, also known as paraffin, is a combustible hydrocarbon liquid which is derived from petroleum. It is widely used as a fuel in aviation as well as households. Its name derives from the Greek κηρός (kērós) meaning "wax"; it was registered as a trademark by Nova Scotia geologist and inventor Abraham Gesner in 1854 before evolving into a generic trademark. It is sometimes spelled kerosine in scientific and industrial usage.

Kerosene is widely used to power jet engines of aircraft (jet fuel), as well as some rocket engines in a highly refined form called RP-1. It is also commonly used as a cooking and lighting fuel, and for fire toys such as poi. In parts of Asia, kerosene is sometimes used as fuel for small outboard motors or even motorcycles. World total kerosene consumption for all purposes is equivalent to about 5,500,000 barrels per day as of July 2023.

The term "kerosene" is common in much of Argentina, Australia, Canada, India, New Zealand, Nigeria, and the United States, while the term paraffin (or a closely related variant) is used in Chile, East Africa, South Africa, Norway, and the United Kingdom. The term "lamp oil", or the equivalent in the local languages, is common in the majority of Asia and the Southeastern United States, although in Appalachia, it is also commonly referred to as "coal oil".

The name "paraffin" is also used to refer to a number of distinct petroleum byproducts other than kerosene. For instance, liquid paraffin (called mineral oil in the US) is a more viscous and highly refined product which is used as a laxative. Paraffin wax is a waxy solid extracted from petroleum.

To prevent confusion between kerosene and the much more flammable and volatile gasoline (petrol), some jurisdictions regulate markings or colourings for containers used to store or dispense kerosene. For example, in the United States, Pennsylvania requires that portable containers used at retail service stations for kerosene be colored blue, as opposed to red (for gasoline) or yellow (for diesel).

The World Health Organization considers kerosene to be a polluting fuel, as kerosene smoke contains high levels of harmful particulate matter.

== Properties and grades ==
Kerosene is a low-viscosity, clear liquid formed from hydrocarbons obtained from the fractional distillation of petroleum between 150 and 275 °C (300 and 525 °F), resulting in a mixture with a density of 0.78–0.81 g/cm^{3}. It is miscible with petroleum solvents, but not with water. It is composed of hydrocarbon molecules that typically contain between 6 and 20 carbon atoms per molecule, predominantly containing 9 to 16 carbon atoms.

Regardless of crude oil source or processing history, kerosene's major components are branched- and straight-chain alkanes (hydrocarbon chains) and naphthenes (cycloalkanes), which normally account for at least 70% of volume. Aromatic hydrocarbons such as alkylbenzenes (single ring) and alkylnaphthalenes (double ring), do not normally exceed 25% by volume of kerosene streams. Olefins are usually not present at more than 5% by volume.

The heat of combustion of kerosene is similar to that of diesel fuel; its lower heating value is 43.1 MJ/kg (around 18,500 Btu/lb), and its higher heating value is 46.2 MJ/kg (19,900 Btu/lb).

ASTM International recognizes two grades of kerosene: 1-K (less than 0.04% sulfur by weight) and 2-K (0.3% sulfur by weight). Grade 1-K kerosene burns cleaner with fewer deposits, fewer toxins, and less frequent maintenance than 2-K, and is the preferred grade for indoor heaters and stoves.

In the United Kingdom, two grades of heating oil are defined. BS 2869 Class C1 is the lightest grade used for lanterns, camping stoves, and wick heaters, and mixed with petrol in some vintage combustion engines as a substitute for tractor vaporizing oil. BS 2869 Class C2 is a heavier distillate, which is used as domestic heating oil. Premium kerosene is usually sold in 5- or 20-litre containers from hardware, camping and garden stores, and is often dyed purple. Standard kerosene is usually dispensed in bulk by a tanker and is undyed.

National and international standards define the properties of several grades of kerosene used for jet fuel. Flash point and freezing point properties are of particular concern for operation and safety; the standards also define additives for control of static electricity and other purposes.

=== Melting, freeze and flash points ===
Kerosene is liquid around room temperature: 25 °C (77 °F). The flash point of kerosene is between 37 °C (99 °F) and 65 °C (149 °F), and its autoignition temperature is 220 °C (428 °F). The freezing point of kerosene depends on grade, with commercial aviation fuel standardized at −47 °C (−53 °F).

Grade 1-K kerosene freezes around −40 °C (−40 °F, 233 K).

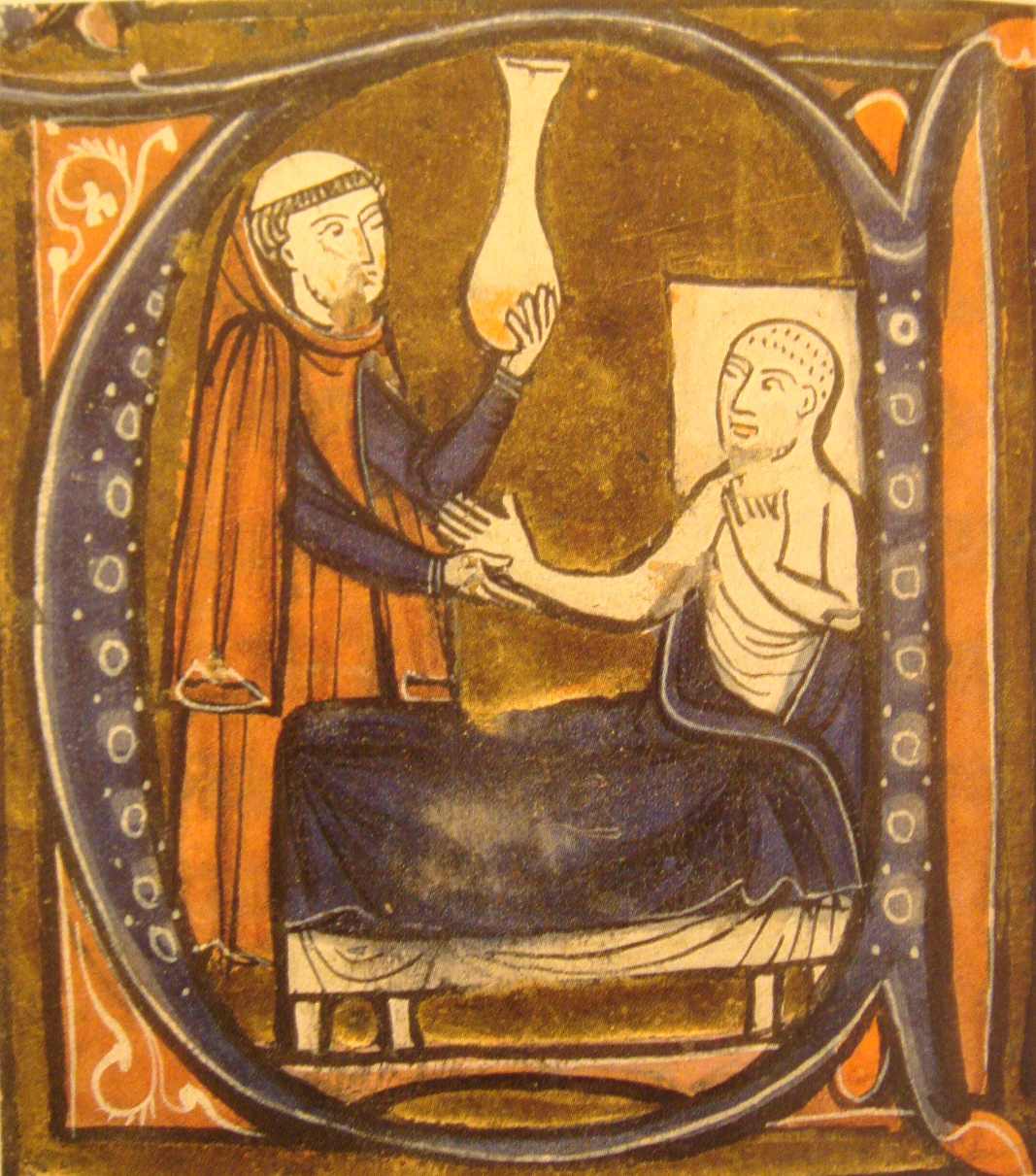
Persian scholar Rāzi (or Rhazes) was the first to distil kerosene in the ninth century. He is depicted here in a manuscript by Gerard of Cremona.

== History ==
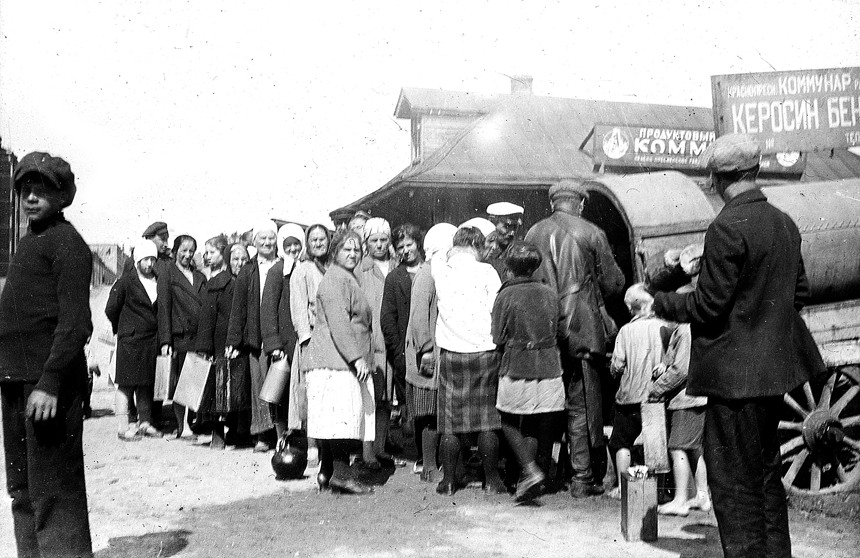
A queue for kerosene. Moscow, Russia, 1920s

The process of distilling crude oil/petroleum into kerosene, as well as other hydrocarbon compounds, was first written about in the ninth century by the Persian scholar Rāzi (or Rhazes). In his Kitab al-Asrar (Book of Secrets), the physician and chemist Razi described two methods for the production of kerosene, termed naft abyad (نفط ابيض "white naphtha"), using an apparatus called an alembic. One method used clay as an absorbent, and later the other method using chemicals like ammonium chloride (sal ammoniac). The distillation process was repeated until most of the volatile hydrocarbon fractions had been removed and the final product was perfectly clear and safe to burn. Kerosene was also produced during the same period from oil shale and bitumen by heating the rock to extract the oil, which was then distilled. During the Chinese Ming Dynasty, the Chinese made use of kerosene through extracting and purifying petroleum and then converted it into lamp fuel. The Chinese made use of petroleum for lighting lamps and heating homes as early as 1500 BC.

=== Illuminating oil from coal and oil shale ===
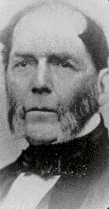
Abraham Gesner distilled kerosene from bituminous coal and oil shale experimentally in 1846; commercial production followed in 1854.

Although "coal oil" was well known by industrial chemists at least as early as the 1700s as a byproduct of making coal gas and coal tar, it burned with a smoky flame that prevented its use for indoor illumination. In cities, much indoor illumination was provided by piped-in coal gas, but outside the cities, and for spot lighting within the cities, the lucrative market for fueling indoor lamps was supplied by whale oil, specifically that from sperm whales, which burned brighter and cleaner.

Canadian geologist Abraham Pineo Gesner claimed that in 1846, he had given a public demonstration in Charlottetown, Prince Edward Island of a new process he had discovered. (Note: In his book of 1861 and its second edition of 1865, Gesner claimed to have demonstrated liquid kerosene – an "oil" – in 1846 during his public lectures on Prince Edward's Island.: Gesner, Abraham (1861) A Practical Treatise on Coal, Petroleum, and Other Distilled Oils. New York, New York, USA: Bailliere Brothers, p. 9.; Gesner, Abraham; Gesner, George Weltden (1865) A Practical Treatise on Coal, Petroleum, and Other Distilled Oils, 2nd ed., New York, New York, USA: Bailliere Brothers, p. 9.; However, John Butt characterized Gesner's book as " … a piece of propaganda designed to get people to believe that he had been constantly interested in inventing burning oil from 1846 to 1854". Butt also stated that "No independent documentary proof has ever been produced to support Gesner's claim." Furthermore, "He [Gesner] omitted to mention that kerosene had first been used to describe an illuminating gas.": Butt, John (1963) "James Young, Scottish Industrialist and Philanthropist", PhD thesis (University of Glasgow, Scotland, UK), p. 227.; As late as 1850, Gesner promoted his "kerosene" as an illuminating gas: In his U.S. patent of 1850, Gesner called the product of his distillations an "illuminating gas", not an oil: Gesner, Abraham "Manufacture of illuminating-gas from bitumen" U.S. Patent no. 7,052 (issued: 29 January 1850).; In his prospectus of 1850, Gesner repeatedly identified "kerosene" as a gas, not an oil: Gesner, Abraham (1850) "Prospectus of Gesner's patent kerosene gas, obtained from bitumen, asphaltum, or mineral pitch". New York, New York, USA: Trehern & Williamson.) He heated coal in a retort, and distilled from it a clear, thin fluid that he showed made an excellent lamp fuel. He coined the name "kerosene" for his fuel, a contraction of keroselaion, meaning wax-oil. The cost of extracting kerosene from coal was high.

Gesner recalled from his extensive knowledge of New Brunswick's geology a naturally occurring asphaltum called albertite. He was blocked from using it by the New Brunswick coal conglomerate because they had coal extraction rights for the province, and he lost a court case when their experts claimed albertite was a form of coal. In 1854, Gesner moved to Newtown Creek, Long Island, New York. There, he secured backing from a group of businessmen. They formed the North American Gas Light Company, to which he assigned his patents.

Despite clear priority of discovery, Gesner did not obtain his first kerosene patent until 1854, two years after James Young's United States patent. Gesner's method of purifying the distillation products appears to have been superior to Young's, resulting in a cleaner and better-smelling fuel. Manufacture of kerosene under the Gesner patents began in New York in 1854 and later in Boston—being distilled from bituminous coal and oil shale. Gesner registered the word "Kerosene" as a trademark in 1854, and for several years, only the North American Gas Light Company and the Downer Company (to which Gesner had granted the right) were allowed to call their lamp oil "Kerosene" in the United States.

In 1848, Scottish chemist James Young experimented with oil discovered seeping in a coal mine as a source of lubricating oil and illuminating fuel. When the seep became exhausted, he experimented with the dry distillation of coal, especially the resinous "boghead coal" (torbanite). He extracted a number of useful liquids from it, one of which he named paraffine oil because at low temperatures, it congealed into a substance that resembled paraffin wax. Young took out a patent on his process and the resulting products in 1850, and built the first truly commercial oil-works in the world at Bathgate in 1851, using oil extracted from locally mined torbanite, shale, and bituminous coal. In 1852, he took out a United States patent for the same invention. These patents were subsequently upheld in both countries in a series of lawsuits, and other producers were obliged to pay him royalties.

=== Kerosene from petroleum ===
In 1851, Samuel Martin Kier began selling lamp oil to local miners, under the name "Carbon Oil". He distilled this from crude oil by a process of his own invention. He also invented a new lamp to burn his product. He has been dubbed the Grandfather of the American Oil Industry by historians. Kier's salt wells began to be fouled with petroleum in the 1840s. At first, Kier simply dumped the oil into the nearby Pennsylvania Main Line Canal as useless waste, but later he began experimenting with several distillates of the crude oil, along with a chemist from eastern Pennsylvania.

Ignacy Łukasiewicz, a Polish pharmacist residing in Lviv, and his partner Jan Zeh had been experimenting with different distillation techniques, trying to improve on Gesner's kerosene process, but using oil from a local petroleum seep. Many people knew of his work, but paid little attention to it. On the night of 31 July 1853, doctors at the local hospital needed to perform an emergency operation, virtually impossible by candlelight. They therefore sent a messenger for Łukasiewicz and his new lamps. The lamp burned so brightly and cleanly that the hospital officials ordered several lamps plus a large supply of fuel. Łukasiewicz realized the potential of his work and quit the pharmacy to find a business partner, and then traveled to Vienna to register his technique with the government. Łukasiewicz moved to the Gorlice region of Poland in 1854, and sank several wells across southern Poland over the following decade, setting up a refinery near Jasło in 1859.

The discovery of petroleum by Edwin Drake when he drilled the Drake Well in western Pennsylvania in 1859 caused a great deal of public excitement and investment drilling in new wells, not only in Pennsylvania, but also in Canada, where petroleum had been discovered at Oil Springs, Ontario in 1858, and southern Poland, where Ignacy Łukasiewicz had been distilling lamp oil from petroleum seeps since 1852. The increased supply of petroleum allowed oil refiners to entirely side-step the oil-from-coal patents of both Young and Gesner, and produce illuminating oil from petroleum without paying royalties to anyone. As a result, the illuminating oil industry in the United States completely switched over to petroleum in the 1860s. The petroleum-based illuminating oil was widely sold as Kerosene, and the trade name soon lost its proprietary status, and became the lower-case generic product "kerosene". Because Gesner's original Kerosene had been also known as "coal oil", generic kerosene from petroleum was commonly called "coal oil" in some parts of the United States well into the 20th century.

In the United Kingdom, manufacturing oil from coal (or oil shale) continued into the early 20th century, although increasingly overshadowed by petroleum oils.

As kerosene production increased, whaling declined. The American whaling fleet, which had been steadily growing for 50 years, reached its all-time peak of 199 ships in 1858. By 1860, just two years later, the fleet had dropped to 167 ships. The Civil War cut into American whaling temporarily, but only 105 whaling ships returned to sea in 1866, the first full year of peace, and that number dwindled until only 39 American ships set out to hunt whales in 1876. Kerosene, made first from coal and oil shale, then from petroleum, had largely taken over whaling's lucrative market in lamp oil.

Electric lighting started displacing kerosene as an illuminant in the late 19th century, especially in urban areas. However, kerosene remained the predominant commercial end-use for petroleum refined in the United States until 1909, when it was exceeded by motor fuels. The rise of the gasoline-powered automobile in the early 20th century created a demand for the lighter hydrocarbon fractions, and refiners invented methods to increase their output of gasoline, while decreasing their output of kerosene. In addition, some of the heavier hydrocarbons that previously went into kerosene were incorporated into diesel fuel. Kerosene kept some market share by being increasingly used in stoves and portable heaters.

=== Kerosene from carbon dioxide and water ===
A pilot project by ETH Zurich used solar power to produce kerosene from carbon dioxide and water in July 2022. The product can be used in existing aviation applications, and "can also be blended with fossil-derived kerosene".

== Production ==
Kerosene is produced by fractional distillation of crude oil in an oil refinery. It condenses at a temperature intermediate between diesel fuel, which is less volatile, and naphtha and gasoline, which are more volatile.

Kerosene made up 8.5 percent by volume of petroleum refinery output in 2021 in the United States, of which nearly all was kerosene-type jet fuel (8.4 percent).

== Applications ==
=== As fuel ===
Fuels for heating
- Heating oil
- Wood pellet
- Kerosene
- Propane
- Natural gas
- Wood
- Coal

==== Heating and lighting ====
The fuel, also known as heating oil in the UK and Ireland, remains widely used in kerosene lamps and lanterns in the developing world. Although it replaced whale oil, the 1873 edition of Elements of Chemistry said, "The vapor of this substance [kerosene] mixed with air is as explosive as gunpowder." This statement may have been due to the common practice of adulterating kerosene with cheaper but more volatile hydrocarbon mixtures, such as naphtha. Kerosene was a significant fire risk; in 1880, nearly two of every five New York City fires were caused by defective kerosene lamps.

In less-developed countries kerosene is an important source of energy for cooking and lighting. It is used as a cooking fuel in portable stoves for backpackers. As a heating fuel, it is often used in portable stoves, and is sold in some filling stations. It is sometimes used as a heat source during power failures.

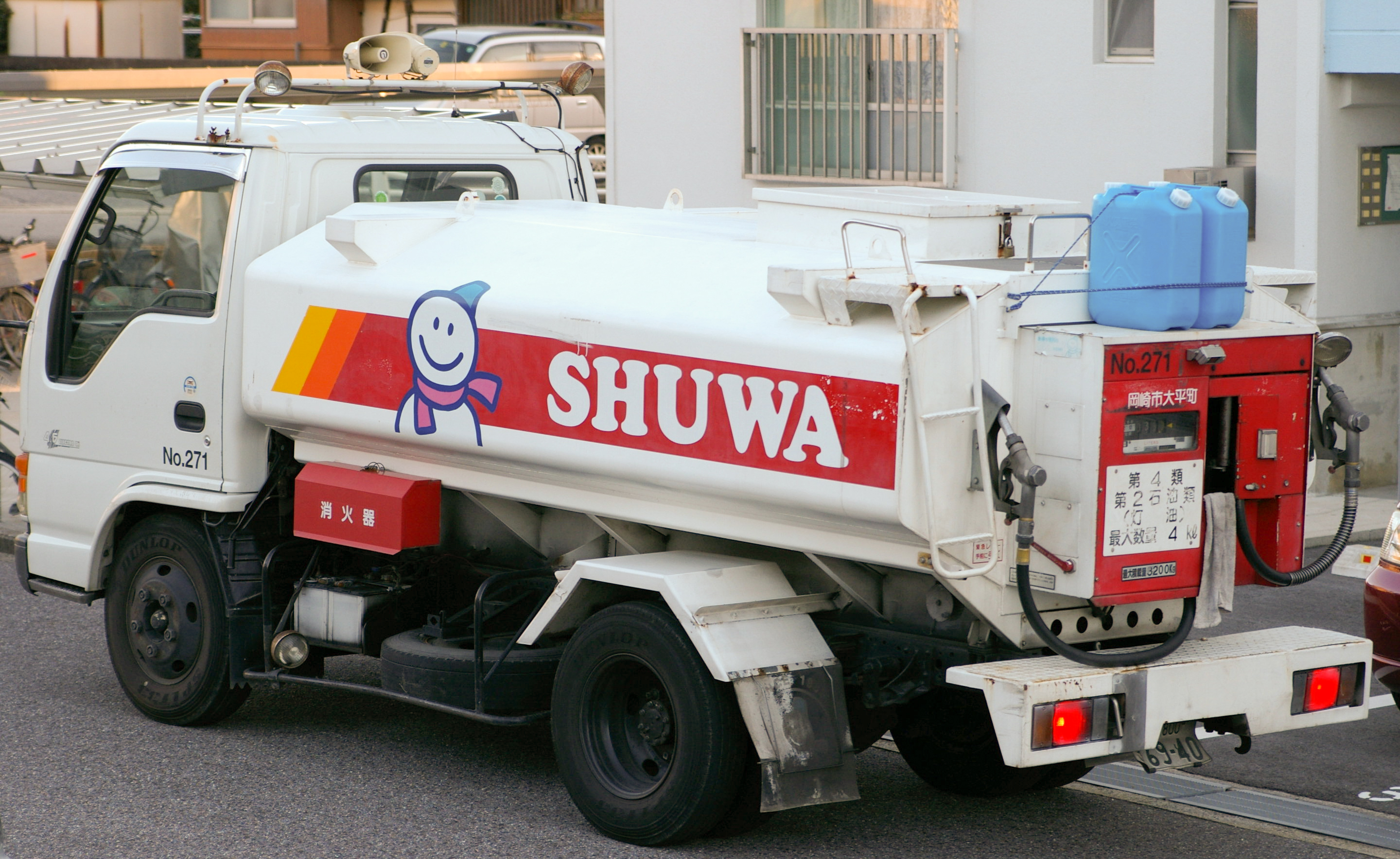
A truck delivering kerosene in Japan

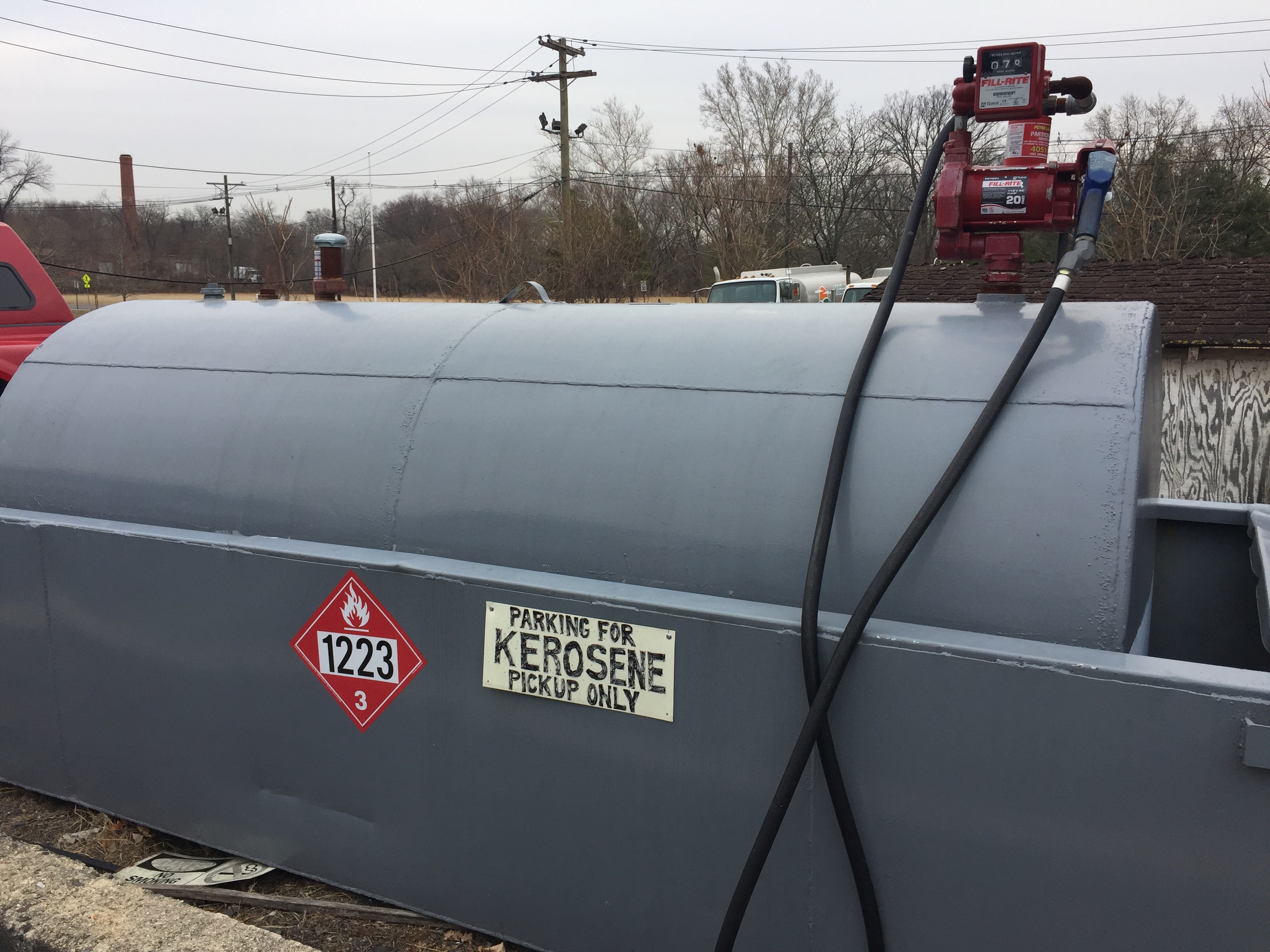
Kerosene storage tank

Kerosene is widely used in Chile and Japan as a home heating fuel for portable and installed kerosene heaters. In these countries, kerosene can be readily bought at any filling station or be delivered to homes in some cases. In the United Kingdom and Ireland, kerosene is often used as a heating fuel in areas not connected to a gas pipeline network. It is used less for cooking, with LPG being preferred because it is easier to light. Kerosene is often the fuel of choice for range cookers such as Rayburn. Additives such as RangeKlene can be put into kerosene to ensure that it burns cleaner and produces less soot when used in range cookers.

The Amish, who generally abstain from the use of electricity, rely on kerosene for lighting at night. More ubiquitous in the late 19th and early 20th centuries, kerosene space heaters were often built into kitchen ranges, and kept many farm and fishing families warm and dry through the winter. At one time, citrus growers used a smudge pot fueled by kerosene to create a pall of thick smoke over a grove in an effort to prevent freezing temperatures from damaging crops. "Salamanders" are kerosene space heaters used on construction sites to dry out building materials and to warm workers. Before the days of electrically lighted road barriers, highway construction zones were marked at night by kerosene fired, pot-bellied torches. Most of these uses of kerosene created thick black smoke because of the low temperature of combustion.

A notable exception, discovered in the early 19th century, is the use of a gas mantle mounted above the wick on a kerosene lamp. Looking like a delicate woven bag above the woven cotton wick, the mantle is a residue of mineral materials (mostly thorium dioxide), heated to incandescence by the flame from the wick. The thorium and cerium oxide combination produces both a whiter light and a greater fraction of the energy in the form of visible light than a black body at the same temperature would. These types of lamps are still in use today in areas of the world without electricity, because they give a much better light than a simple wick-type lamp does. Recently, a multipurpose lantern that doubles as a cook stove has been introduced in India in areas with no electricity.

==== Cooking ====
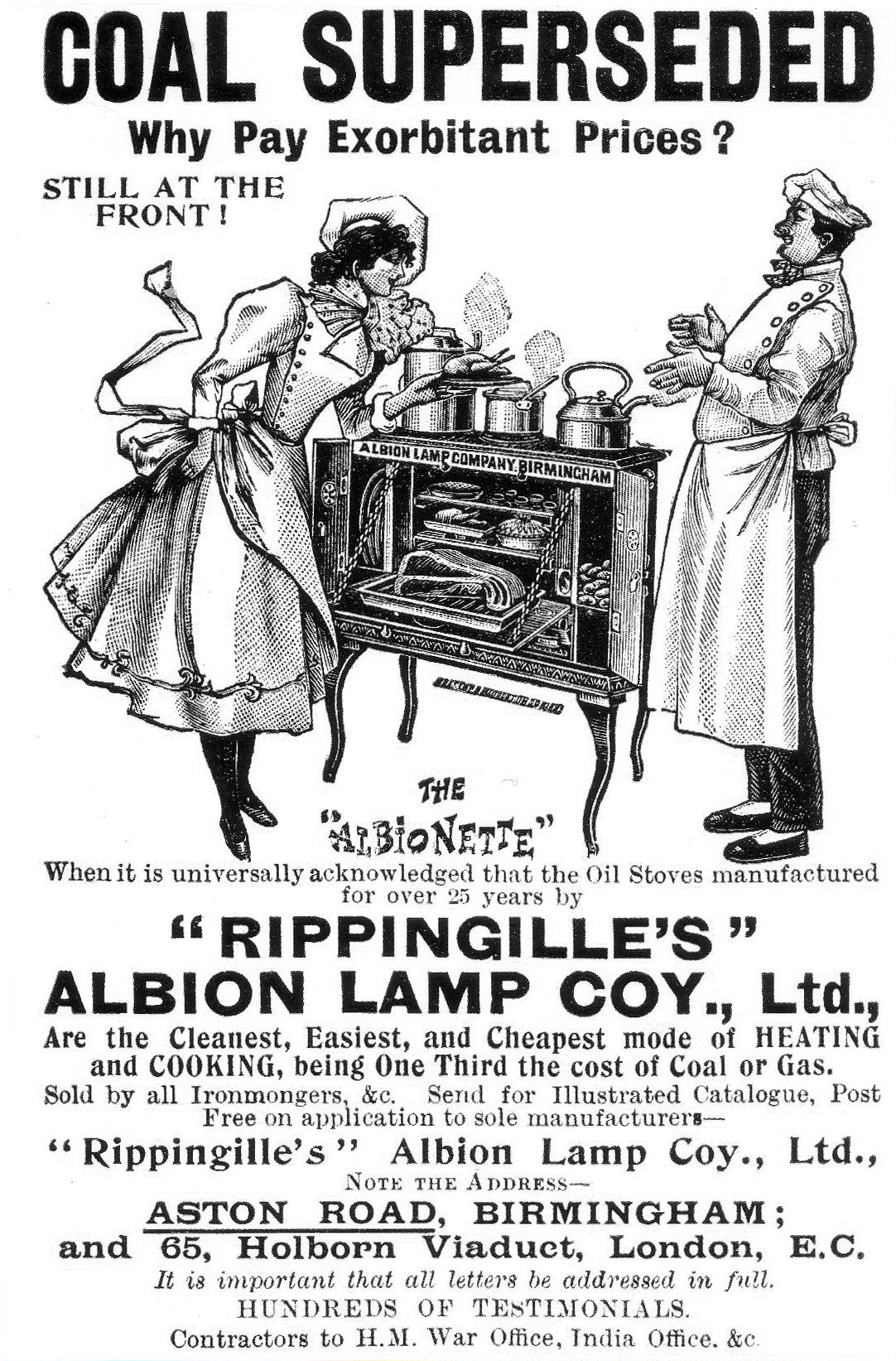
Advertisement for an oil stove, from the Albion Lamp Company, Birmingham, England, c. 1900

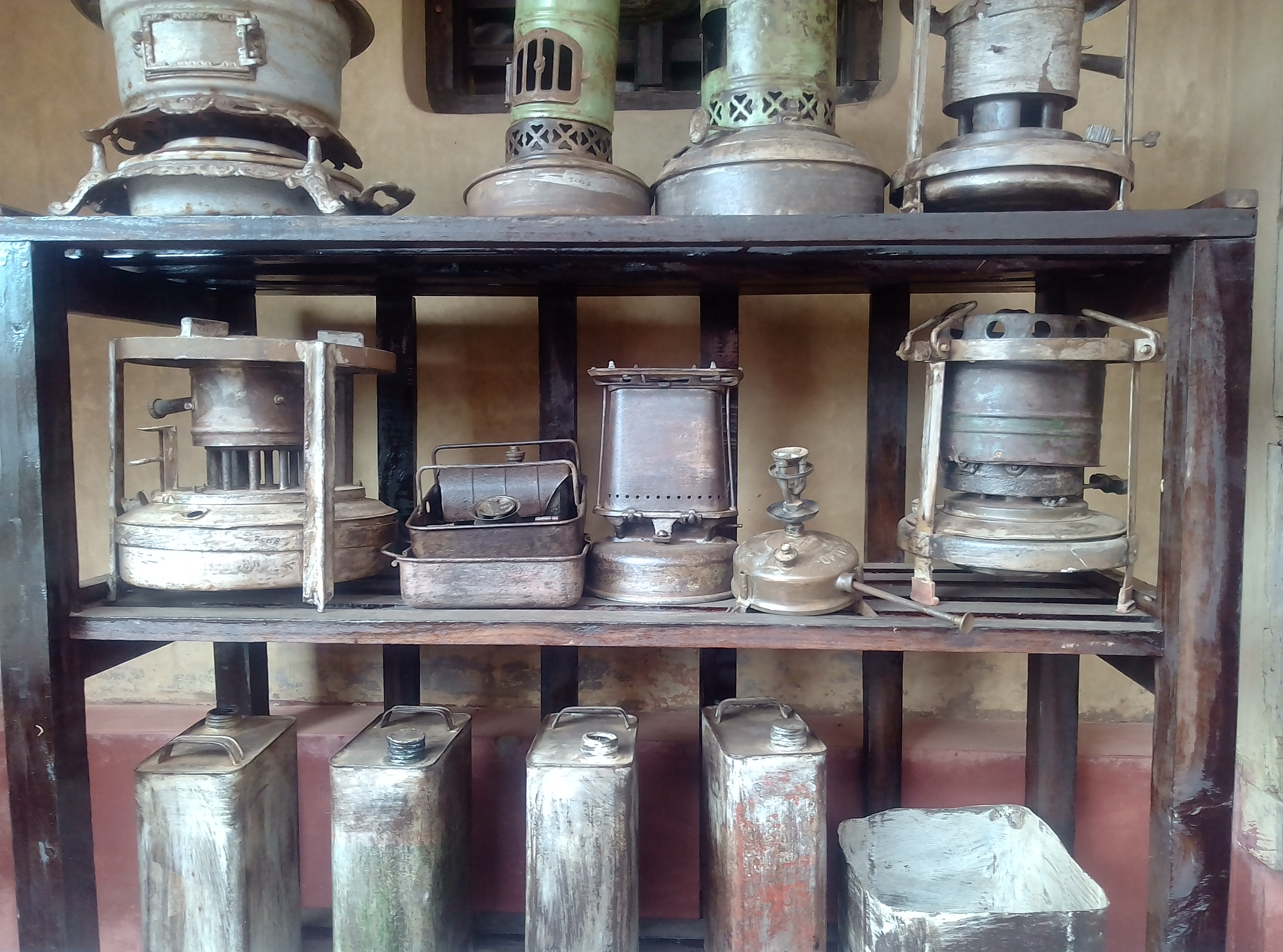
Old kerosene stoves from India

In countries such as Nigeria, kerosene is the main fuel used for cooking, especially by the poor, and kerosene stoves have replaced traditional wood-based cooking appliances. As such, increases in the price of kerosene can have a major political and environmental consequence. The Indian government subsidizes the fuel to keep the price very low, to around 15 U.S. cents per liter as of February 2007, as keeping the price low discourages dismantling of forests for cooking fuel. In Nigeria, an attempt by the government to remove a fuel subsidy that includes kerosene met with strong opposition.

Kerosene is used as a fuel in portable stoves, especially in Primus stoves invented in 1892. Portable kerosene stoves are reliable and durable in everyday use, and perform especially well under adverse conditions. In outdoor activities and mountaineering, a decisive advantage of pressurized kerosene stoves over gas cartridge stoves is their particularly high thermal output and their ability to operate at very low ambient temperatures in winter or at high altitude. Wick stoves like Perfection's or wickless like Boss continue to be used by the Amish and off grid living, and in natural disasters where there is no power available.

==== Engines ====
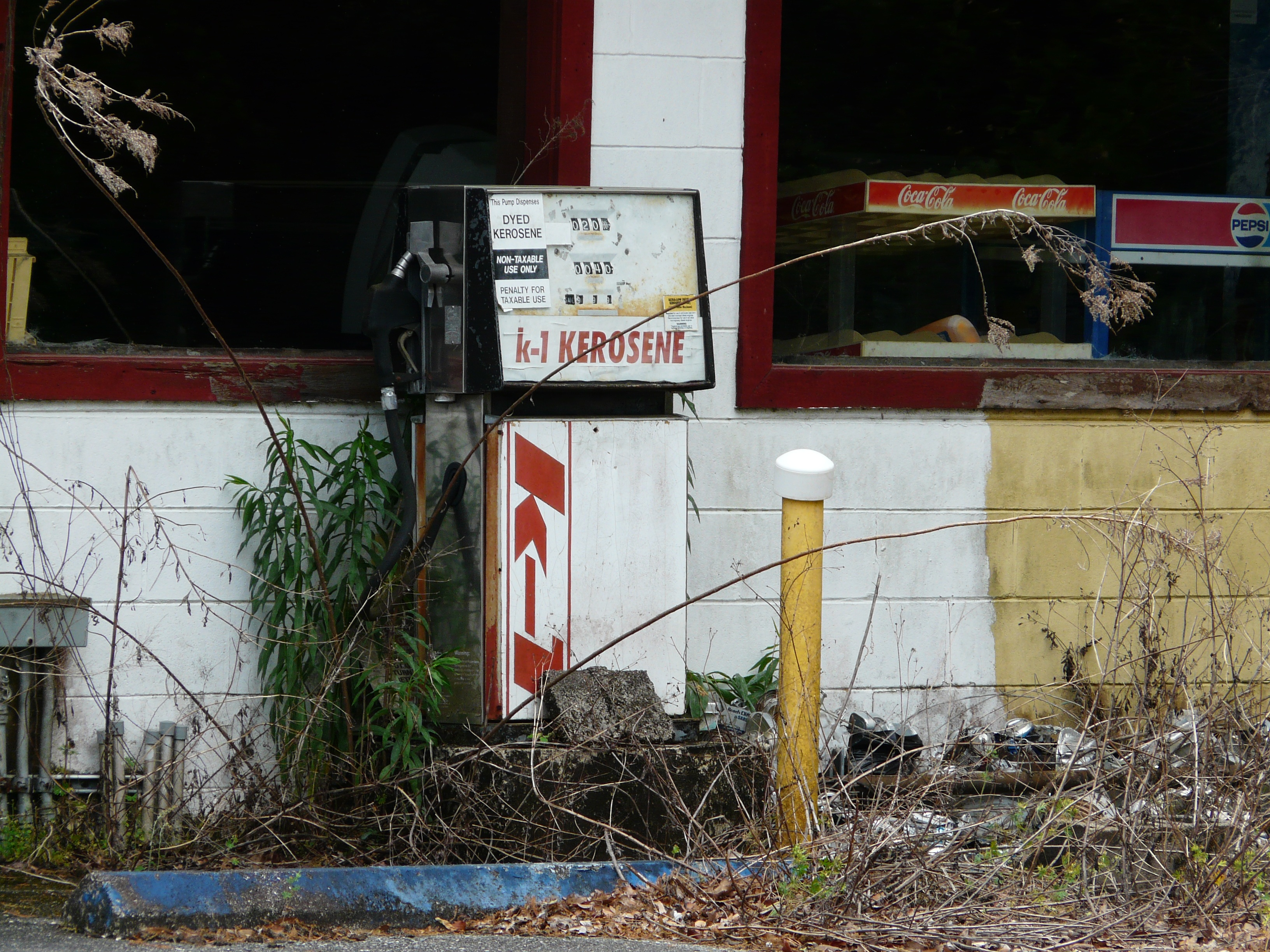
Fuel pump for kerosene at an abandoned gas station

In the early to mid-20th century, kerosene or tractor vaporizing oil was used as a cheap fuel for tractors and hit-and-miss engines. A petrol-paraffin engine would start on gasoline, then switch over to kerosene once the engine warmed up. On some engines, a heat valve on the manifold would route the exhaust gasses around the intake pipe, heating the kerosene to the point where it was vaporized and could be ignited by an electric spark.

In Europe following the Second World War, automobiles were similarly modified to run on kerosene rather than gasoline, which they would have to import and pay heavy taxes on. Besides additional piping and the switch between fuels, the head gasket was replaced by a much thicker one to diminish the compression ratio (making the engine less powerful and less efficient, but able to run on kerosene). The necessary equipment was sold under the trademark "Econom".

During the fuel crisis of the 1970s, Saab-Valmet developed and series-produced the Saab 99 Petro that ran on kerosene, turpentine or gasoline. The project, codenamed "Project Lapponia", was headed by Simo Vuorio, and towards the end of the 1970s, a working prototype was produced based on the Saab 99 GL. The car was designed to run on two fuels. Gasoline was used for cold starts and when extra power was needed, but normally it ran on kerosene or turpentine. The idea was that the gasoline could be made from peat using the Fischer–Tropsch process. Between 1980 and 1984, 3,756 Saab 99 Petros and 2,385 Talbot Horizons (a version of the Chrysler Horizon that integrated many Saab components) were made. One reason to manufacture kerosene-fueled cars was that, in Finland, kerosene was less heavily taxed than gasoline.

Kerosene is used to fuel smaller-horsepower outboard motors built by Yamaha, Suzuki, and Tohatsu. Primarily used on small fishing craft, these are dual-fuel engines that start on gasoline and then transition to kerosene once the engine reaches optimum operating temperature. Multiple fuel Evinrude and Mercury Racing engines also burn kerosene, as well as jet fuel.

Today, kerosene is mainly used in fuel for jet engines in several grades. One highly refined form of the fuel is known as RP-1, and is often burned with liquid oxygen as rocket fuel. These fuel grade kerosenes meet specifications for smoke points and freeze points. The combustion reaction can be approximated as follows, with the molecular formula C_{12}H_{26} (dodecane):

2 C_{12}H_{26}(l) + 37 O_{2}(g) → 24 CO_{2}(g) + 26 H_{2}O(g); ∆H˚ = -7513 kJ

In the initial phase of liftoff, the Saturn V launch vehicle was powered by the reaction of liquid oxygen with RP-1. For the five 6.4 meganewton sea-level thrust F-1 rocket engines of the Saturn V, burning together, the reaction generated roughly 1.62 × 10^{11} watts (J/s) (162 gigawatt) or 217 million horsepower.

Kerosene is sometimes used as an additive in diesel fuel to prevent gelling or waxing in cold temperatures.

Ultra-low sulfur kerosene is a custom-blended fuel used by the New York City Transit Authority to power its bus fleet. The transit agency started using this fuel in 2004, prior to the widespread adoption of ultra-low-sulfur diesel, which has since become the standard. In 2008, the suppliers of the custom fuel failed to tender for a renewal of the transit agency's contract, leading to a negotiated contract at a significantly increased cost.

JP-8 (for "Jet Propellant 8"), a kerosene-based fuel, is used by the United States military as a replacement in diesel fueled vehicles and for powering aircraft. JP-8 is also used by the U.S. military and its NATO allies as a fuel for heaters, stoves, tanks, and as a replacement for diesel fuel in the engines of nearly all tactical ground vehicles and electrical generators.

=== Chemical processes ===
Aliphatic kerosene is a type of kerosene which has a low aromatic hydrocarbon content. The aromatic content of crude oil varies greatly from oil field to oil field, however by solvent extraction, it is possible to separate aromatic hydrocarbons from aliphatic (alkane) hydrocarbons. A common method is solvent extraction with methanol, DMSO or sulfolane. Aromatic kerosene is a grade of kerosene with a large concentration of aromatic hydrocarbons, an example of this would be Exxon's Solvesso 150.

Kerosene is commonly used in metal extraction as the diluent. For example, in copper extraction by LIX-84, it can be used in mixer settlers.

Kerosene is used as a diluent in the PUREX extraction process, but it is increasingly being supplanted by dodecane and other artificial hydrocarbons such as TPH (hydrogenated propylene trimer). Traditionally the UK plants at Sellafield used aromatic kerosene to reduce the radiolysis of TBP while the French nuclear industry tended to use diluents with very little aromatic content. The French nuclear reprocessing plants typically use TPH as their diluent. In recent times, it has been shown by Mark Foreman at Chalmers that aliphatic kerosene can be replaced in solvent extraction with HVO100, which is a second generation biodiesel made by Neste.

In X-ray crystallography, kerosene can be used to store crystals. When a hydrated crystal is left in air, dehydration may occur slowly. This makes the color of the crystal become dull. Kerosene can keep air away from the crystal.

It can be also used to prevent air from re-dissolving in a boiled liquid, and to store alkali metals such as potassium, sodium, and rubidium (with the exception of lithium, which is less dense than kerosene, causing it to float).

=== In entertainment ===
Kerosene is often used in the entertainment industry for fire performances, such as fire breathing, fire juggling or poi, and fire dancing. Because of its low flame temperature when burnt in free air, the risk is lower should the performer come in contact with the flame. Kerosene is generally not recommended as fuel for indoor fire dancing, as it produces an unpleasant (to some) odor, which becomes poisonous in sufficient concentration. Ethanol was sometimes used instead, but the flames it produces look less impressive, and its lower flash point poses a high risk.

=== In industry ===
As a petroleum product miscible with many industrial liquids, kerosene can be used as both a solvent, able to remove other petroleum products, such as chain grease, and as a lubricant, with less risk of combustion when compared to using gasoline. It can also be used as a cooling agent in metal production and treatment (oxygen-free conditions).

In the petroleum industry, kerosene is often used as a synthetic hydrocarbon for corrosion experiments to simulate crude oil in field conditions.

=== Solvent ===
Kerosene can be used as an adhesive remover on hard-to-remove mucilage or adhesive left by stickers on a glass surface (such as in show windows of stores).

It can be used to remove candle wax that has dripped onto a glass surface; it is recommended that the excess wax be scraped off prior to applying kerosene via a soaked cloth or tissue paper.

It can be used to clean bicycle and motorcycle chains of old lubricant before relubrication.

It can also be used to thin oil-based paint used in fine art. Some artists even use it to clean their brushes; however, it leaves the bristles greasy to the touch.

=== Others ===
It has seen use for water tank mosquito control in Australia, where a temporary thin floating layer above the water protects it until the defective tank is repaired.

== Toxicity ==
The World Health Organization considers kerosene to be a polluting fuel and recommends that "governments and practitioners immediately stop promoting its household use". Kerosene smoke contains high levels of harmful particulate matter, and household use of kerosene is associated with higher risks of cancer, respiratory infections, asthma, tuberculosis, cataract, and adverse pregnancy outcomes.

Ingestion of kerosene is harmful. Kerosene is sometimes recommended as a folk remedy for killing head lice, but health agencies warn against this as it can cause burns and serious illness. A kerosene shampoo can even be fatal if fumes are inhaled.

People can be exposed to kerosene in the workplace by breathing it in, swallowing it, skin contact, and eye contact. The US National Institute for Occupational Safety and Health has set a recommended exposure limit of 100 mg/m^{3} over an 8-hour workday.

== See also ==
- Adiabatic flame temperature
- Gasoline gallon equivalent
- Kerosene jet fuel
