= Katende Ssempebwa =

Ugandan law firm

- Headquarters: Radiant House, Plot 20 Kampala Road, Kampala, Uganda
- No. of offices: 1
- No. of attorneys: 25
- No. of employees: 60
- Major practice areas: Solicitor & Transactional work Litigation & Alternative Dispute Resolution; Intellectual Property; Business support
- Key people: John W. Katende (Senior Partner), Professor Frederick E. Ssempebwa (Senior Partner), Samuel S. Sserwanga (Partner), Soogi K. Katende (Partner), Arthur M. Katende (Partner), Sim K. Katende (Partner).
- Date founded: 1969 (Kampala)
- Founder: John W. Katende & Professor Frederick E. Ssempebwa
- Company type: LLP
- Website: www.kats.co.ug

Founded in 1969, Katende Ssempebwa & Co. Advocates (KATS) is a Ugandan law firm headquartered in Kampala, the country's capital city. It is considered one of the leading corporate and commercial firms in Uganda.

KATS is the largest full-service law firm in Uganda in terms of staff size. The firm is a member of the LEXAfrica network, a pan-African legal alliance. John W. Katende serves as the firm's managing partner, while co-founder Professor Frederick E. Ssempebwa is recognized for his expertise in Ugandan constitutional matters and regional mandates.

KATS provides legal services to a diverse range of clients, including governments, non-governmental organizations, multinationals corporations, and other businesses. One prominent example includes advising Warid Telecom Uganda on its $500 million merger with Bharti Airtel in 2013. The firm has also acted as legal counsel for the Ugandan government on significant projects, such as the development of the country's first oil refinery valued at $3 billion.

KATS played a critical role in Uganda's legal history. Notably, the firm successfully argued before the Constitutional Court in 2007 that the death penalty for certain offenses was unconstitutional, leading to its abolition in the country. Earlier, the firm had contributed to the restoration of traditional institutions in Uganda by advocating for the removal of constitutional provisions that abolished them in 1966. KATS also played a part in the legal framework that enabled the return of confiscated properties to the Buganda kingdom and other traditional entities. These efforts ultimately facilitated the coronations of the Kabaka of Buganda and other traditional rulers in 1993.

This revised text removes promotional language and focuses on providing factual information about KATS' history, structure, clientele, and noteworthy legal work.

== History ==
Katende Ssempebwa was founded by John W. Katende and Frederick E. Ssempebwa in 1969. Over nearly five decades, the firm has grown into a limited liability partnership of ten partners, fifteen associates and thirty-five support staff and interns.

== Location ==
Although the firm's primary offices are located in the heart of Kampala’s city center, Katende Ssempebwa maintains a presence in all the major capitals, tax havens and financial centers of the world through its international legal networks.

== Notable clients ==
The firm has provided legal services to the Government of the Republic of Uganda, Samsung, Google, Puma, Facebook, Goldman Sachs, Total, Siemens, KLM Royal Dutch Airlines, Vodafone, Nokia, Qatar Airways, Coca-Cola, and Turkish Airlines.

== Practice areas ==
Katende Ssempebwa is a full-service advisory law firm whose practice is fourfold: Transactional & Advisory services, Litigation & Alternative Dispute Resolution, Intellectual Property and Business development:

=== Transactional and advisory services ===
This involves legal practice in the following areas:

Anti-trust/ Competition, Aviation Law, Banking & Finance, Bankruptcy, Debt recovery, Receiverships, Capital markets, Corporate & Commercial Law, Company Secretarial services, Employment /Labour, Energy, oil & gas, Entertainment, Environment, Family Law, Immigration, Insurance, International Trade, Mergers & Acquisitions, Mining,

Non-Profit Organisations, Project Finance, Property / Real Estate, Public-Private Partnerships (PPP), Tax & Compliance, Telecom, Media & Technology.

=== Litigation and alternative dispute resolution ===
The firm has been involved in several groundbreaking, law-making, and landmark litigation cases that have shaped the laws of East Africa and many of which are compulsory reading at all East African law schools. KATS litigation practice falls into three categories: Civil & Commercial, Criminal and Constitutional

=== Intellectual property ===
The firm has an Intellectual Property department that handles all matters concerning trademarks, patents, copyright, industrial designs, and trade secrets.

=== Business Support ===
The firm offers Business Support services to assist clients in registering, running, and maintaining their businesses. This includes but is not limited to: Company Secretarial services, Work permits and Citizenship applications, Private investigations, and Estate management.

== Memberships ==
- Uganda Law Society (ULS)
- World Services Group (WSG)
- LEXAfrica Network
- International Trademark Association (INTA)

== Awards and rankings ==
The 2018 IFLR1000's law rankings for Katende Ssempebwa indicate that it is a "Tier 1" firm in both Financial & Corporate and Project Development practice areas. The firm has been consistently ranked a Tier 1 firm by IFLR1000 in its 2009, 2010, 2011, 2012, 2013, 2014, 2015, 2016, 2017, and 2018 Editions.

Katende Ssempebwa is ranked as a "Band 1" Ugandan law firm in the 2018 Edition of Chambers & Partners Global Guide to the World's Leading Lawyers for Business. KATS has been consistently ranked as a "Band 1" firm by Chambers in its 2000, 2001, 2002, 2003, 2004, 2005, 2006, 2007, 2008, 2009, 2010, 2011, 2012, 2013, 2014, 2015, 2016, 2017 and 2018 Editions.

The firm's founding partners, John W. Katende and Professor Frederick E. Ssempebwa are ranked as the only Ugandan "Senior Statesmen" (lawyers who no longer work hands-on with the same intensity but who, by virtue of close links with major clients, remain pivotal to the firm's success) in the 2018 Edition of Chambers & Partners. They have been consistently recognized by Chambers for the past 18 years.

Arthur Katende, a Principal Associate, was deemed a "rising star" by the same publication in its 2015, 2016, 2017, and 2018 editions.

== See also ==
- Law Development Centre
- Uganda Law Society
