= Kale Kayihura =

Ugandan lawyer, military officer, farmer and former policeman

- Born: 26 December 1955 (age 70); Uganda
- Citizenship: Uganda
- Education: Makerere University (Bachelor of Laws); Law Development Centre (Diploma in Legal Practice); London School of Economics (Master of Laws); Maxwell Air Force Base (Senior Staff and Command Course)
- Occupations: Lawyer; Military officer Policeman
- Years active: Since 1982
- Known for: Police work
- Spouse: Angella Kayihura

General Edward Kalekezi Kayihura, commonly known as Kale Kayihura, is a Ugandan lawyer, military general, farmer and former policeman. He was the Inspector General of Police (IGP) of the Uganda Police Force (the highest rank in that branch of Uganda's government) from 2005 until 5 March 2018. He was succeeded by Martin Okoth Ochola in an unexpected reshuffle. This also saw the Minister for security Henry Tumukunde replaced.

== Early life ==
Kale Kayihura was born in Kisoro District, Western Uganda, on 26 December 1955. He is the son of Johnson Komuluyange Kalekezi, one of the Ugandans who fought for the African Great Lakes nation's independence, which occurred on 9 October 1962. His father died in an aeroplane crash in Kiev, Ukraine on 17 August 1960, when Kayihura was only four years old. His mother is Catherine Mukarwamo, first-born child of Nyamihana, a former chief of Nyakabande village. Nyamihana was also the father of Justice Joseph Mulenga Nyamihana, who served as president of the East African Court of Justice and died on 29 August 2012.

== Formal education ==
He went to Gasiza Primary School in Kisoro District, transferred to Buhinga Primary School in Kabarole District. He studied at Mutolere Secondary School, at Mutolere, in Kisoro District, up to Senior Four, under the care of his maternal grandmother, the late Sofia Nyamihana. His brilliance in school caught the attention of his paternal uncle, the late Frank Gasasira, an accomplished civil servant at the time, who took over the responsibility of his education. In 1974, Kayihura was enrolled in St. Mary's College Kisubi for his Advanced Level education. He studied Drama, History, English Literature and Economics. He did well and was admitted to Makerere University for the Bachelor of Laws (LLB) degree. He graduated in 1978 and proceeded to the London School of Economics from which he graduated with the degree of Master of Laws (LLM), in 1982, at age 26.

== Military education ==
Kayihura has attended a number of military courses, including the following:

- The Army Command Course at the Army Commander College, in Nanjing, China
- The Combined Arms Course
- The Brigade/Battalion Commander's Course
- The Conflict Resolution and Management Course at Nasser Military Academy, Cairo, Egypt
- The Command and Staff Course at Maxwell Air Force Base, Montgomery, Alabama, United States, from 2000 to 2001

== Public service ==
In 1982, following his graduation from the University of London, Kayihura joined the National Resistance Army, a rebel outfit that fought the regime of Milton Obote II and captured power in 1986. He has since grown in military rank and held multiple offices in the army and public service, including the following:

- As an aide de camp to the commander of the Mobile Brigade, from 1982 to 1986
- As a staff officer in the Office of the Assistant Minister of Defence, from 1986 to 1988
- As chief political commissar and simultaneous director of Political Education in the National Resistance Army
- As the operational commander of the UPDF forces in Ituri Province, Democratic Republic of the Congo
- As a military assistant to the president of Uganda. In that capacity, he headed the Anti-Smuggling Unit, whose official name is Special Revenue Police Services.

He formerly served as the IGP of the Uganda Police Force. He had served in that position since 2005 when he replaced General Edward Katumba Wamala as the IGP. He was the second Ugandan military officer to serve as the chief of the Uganda Police Force, in the history of the country. General Kayihura is still an active member of Uganda's military and was previously the Head of the country's Revenue Protection Services.

== Controversies ==
Kayihura was largely perceived (amongst Uganda's political circles and a large section of the population) as working for and promoting Museveni's personal interests through squashing of Museveni's political opponents. During the 2016 general elections, he was behind the implementation of the controversial Public Order Management Act (POMA) which largely targeted opposition politicians and their rights to assemble. He has, in most cases appeared to be ruthless while dealing with opposition political protests. Kayihura infamously admitted before the media that he had sanctioned the beatings of supporters of Dr. Kizza Besigye, a leading opposition figure and four-time presidential candidate in Uganda. However, he later backtracked due to public pressure and promised that the culprits (who had participated in the beatings) would face disciplinary action. A team of private lawyers separately filed a criminal case against Kayihura and other senior commanders for their involvement in the July 2016 beatings. Criminal summonses were issued by the magistrate court for the IGP and seven other senior officers to appear in court to answer charges of torture but none of them showed up in court. These proceedings were later halted by the controversial Deputy Chief Justice Steven Kavuma.

On 13 June 2018, Kayihura was arrested on suspicion of killing police spokesman Andrew Felix Kaweesi in March 2017.

Kayihura appeared at the military court in Kampala, Uganda, on 24 August 2018. He was released on bail after 76 days in military custody on charges of failure to protect war materials and aiding and abetting kidnapping.

== Sacking as Inspector General of Police ==
On 4 March 2018, President Yoweri Museveni elevated Martin Okoth Ochola, previously the deputy police chief, to Inspector General of Police, on the same day General Elly Tumwine replaced Lieutenant General Henry Tumukunde as Security Minister. This followed widespread outcry from concerned citizens, regarding increased insecurity in the country, with the police cavorting with known criminal gangs. Kidnappings-for-ransom, wanton murders and robberies, including a rash of unexplained tourist deaths; all unsolved, which left the security apparatus clueless.

== Personal life ==
He is married to Angella Kayihura, a Kenyan of Rwandese descent. She is the grand-niece of Rudahigwa, the last king of pre-independence Rwanda. The Kayihuras are the parents of two children. He is reported to own a mixed farm on 350 acres (140 ha) of land in Kabula, Lyantonde District, on which he owns about 500 goats.

== US sanctions ==
On 13 September 2019, Kayihura was sanctioned by the United States Department of the Treasury for gross violation of human rights when he was head of the Uganda Police Force (UPF). The sanctions relate to Kayihura's involvement in instructing the Flying Squad Unit to torture Ugandans at places such as the notorious Nalufenya Special Investigations Center in Jinja, Eastern Uganda. The sanctions press release states that, "As the IGP for the UPF, Kayihura led individuals from the UPF's Flying Squad Unit, which has engaged in the inhumane treatment of detainees at the Nalufenya Special Investigations Center (NSIC). Flying Squad Unit members reportedly used sticks and rifle butts to abuse NSIC detainees, and officers at NSIC are accused of having beaten one of the detainees with blunt instruments to the point that he lost consciousness. Detainees also reported that after being subjected to the abuse they were offered significant sums of money if they confessed to their involvement in a crime." The statement further states that Kayihura's property owned in the US or by US Citizens will be blocked and must be reported, "As a result of today’s action, all property and interests in property of Kayihura, and of any entities that are owned, directly or indirectly, 50 percent or more by him alone or with other designated persons, that are in the United States or in the possession or control of U.S. persons, are blocked and must be reported to OFAC - Office of Foreign Assets Control."
