= Lwengo District =

- District
- District location in Uganda
- Coordinates: 00°24′S 31°25′E
- Country: Uganda
- Region: Central Region
- Capital: Lwengo

Area
  - Land: 914.7 km^{2} (353.2 sq mi)

Population (2012 Estimate)
  - Total: 267,300
  - Density: 292.2/km^{2} (757/sq mi)
- Time zone: UTC+3 (EAT)
- Website: www.lwengo.go.ug

Lwengo District is a district in the Central Region of Uganda. Kyazanga Town council is the largest town in the district and the location of the district headquarters.

== Location ==
Lwengo District is bordered by Sembabule District to the north, Bukomansimbi District to the north-east, Masaka District to the east, Rakai District to the south, and Lyantonde District to the west. Lwengo is 45 kilometres (28 mi) west of Masaka, the nearest large city. The coordinates of the district are:00 24S, 31 25E.

== Overview ==
Created by an Act of Parliament, Lwengo District became functional on 1 July 2010. Before that, it was part of the Masaka District.

== Population ==
The 1991 national population census estimated the district population at 212,600. The next census in 2002 put the population at about 242,300. In 2012, the population was estimated at 267,300.

== Economic activities ==
Means of earning a livelihood in Lwengo District include:

- Livestock keeping
- Fishing
- Trade and pit sawing
