= Martin Okoth Ochola =

Ugandan police officer

- Born: 19 September 1958 (age 67); Agumiti Village, Tororo District, Uganda
- Citizenship: Uganda
- Education: Namilyango College (Ordinary Certificate of Education) (Advanced Certificate of Education); Makerere University (Bachelor of Laws); Law Development Centre (Diploma in Legal Practice)
- Occupation: Police officer
- Years active: Since 1985
- Known for: Police work

Martin Okoth Ochola is a Ugandan police officer who served as the inspector general of police (IGP) of the Uganda Police Force (the highest rank in that branch of Uganda's government), effective 4 March 2018 to 4 March 2024. He replaced General Kale Kayihura as IGP. Before being appointed, he was the Deputy IGP. After his retirement, he was replaced by Abbas Byakagaba as IGP.

== Background and education ==
Ochola was born on 19 September 1958, in Agumiti village, Mulanda sub-county, West Budama County, in Tororo District. He attended Abweli Primary School, then Rock View Primary School and Kisoko Boys Primary School, where he sat his primary leaving examinations. He attended Namilyango College, where he obtained his high school diploma.

He studied law at Makerere University, the largest and oldest public university in Uganda. He graduated with a Bachelor of Laws degree in 1983. The following year, he obtained a postgraduate diploma in legal practice, from the Law Development Centre.

== Career ==
Ochola went into private law practice, working as a legal assistant between October and December 1984, at the law firm of Owori and Company Advocates in Mbale Town, in the Eastern Region of Uganda. He then relocated to Kampala, Uganda's capital city, where he worked as a legal assistant in Kampala City Council for three years.

He joined the Uganda Police Force in January 1988 and started a nine-month basic training. At that time, he was given the rank of a cadet assistant superintendent of police. Following that training, in February 1989, he was posted to Entebbe International Airport as the officer in charge of airport security.

From there, Ochola served at Entebbe Police Station, Buganda Road Court, where he remained for three years. He was then posted to police headquarters as the acting assistant commissioner of police in the legal department. He was promoted to superintendent of police and later to senior superintendent of police.

In May 2001, he was appointed the deputy director of criminal investigations and remained in that position for seven years. In 2008, he was promoted to commissioner of police. That same year, he was confirmed as director CID. In 2009, he was promoted to the rank of Assistant Inspector General of Police.

In August 2011, President Yoweri Museveni appointed him the deputy inspector general of police; Ochola served in that position until replacing Kale Kayihura as IGP and in turn deputizing Kayihura.
