= Masaka–Mbarara Road =

Road in Uganda

Coordinates: 00°26′00″S 31°05′40″E

Route information
- Length: 95.8 mi (154.2 km)
- History: Designated in 2008; Completion in 2011

Major junctions
- East end: Masaka
- Lyantonde
- North end: Mbarara

Location
- Country: Uganda

Highway system
- Roads in Uganda

The Masaka–Mbarara Road is a road in the Central and Western Regions of Uganda, connecting the cities of Masaka in Masaka District, Central Region and Mbarara in Mbarara District, Western Region.

== Location ==
The road starts at Masaka and goes through Lyantonde, and ends in Mbarara, a distance of about 138 kilometres (86 mi). The road improvements involved road extensions making the contract road length 154.2 kilometres (96 mi).

== Overview ==
Before 2008, the road had a bitumen surface in poor state. In 2008, the government of Uganda, with funding from the European Union, began upgrading the road to grade II bitumen surface with shoulders, culverts, and drainage channels. The work was contracted to Reynolds Construction Company of Nigeria, at a cost of Sh230 billion (approx. €79 or US$104 million at that time).

== See also ==
- List of roads in Uganda
