= Total value of ownership =

Total value of ownership (TVO) or total value of opportunity, is a methodology of measuring and analyzing the business value of IT investments. Gartner Group designed this methodology in 2003.

TVO differs from total cost of ownership (TCO) in that TVO considers the benefits of alternative investments. It is a comparative measurement that evaluates the TCO and any additional benefits, such as the mobility of laptops when compared to desktop computers.
