= Amos Twinomujuni =

Ugandan judge

- Born: 1945 (age 80–81)
- Died: Kololo hospital, Kampala
- Resting place: Mbarara
- Citizenship: Ugandan
- Title: Lawyer, Legal practitioner,Judge,Academic

Amos Twinomujuni (1945 - 15 November 2013) was a Justice of the Supreme Court of Uganda.

== Early life and education ==
Amos was born in 1945. He Finalized his two-year Executive MBA at ESAMI and Maastricht school of Management in the Netherlands in 2006.

== Career ==
He started his judicial career in 1973 as a grade one magistrate. He served as the Director of the Law Development center and Director of Public Prosecutions. He was one of the Justices of the constitutional Court in 2002. He was appointed as the Supreme Court in June 2013.

== Death ==
Amos passed on 15 November 2013 at Kololo hospital in Kampala. He fell victim to Cancer related ailment that he was combating for more than two years. He was buried in Mbarara District.

== See also ==
- Judiciary of Uganda
- Law Development Centre
