= Lwengo =

- Location in Uganda
- Coordinates: 00°23′28″S 31°27′38″E
- Country: Uganda
- Region: Central Uganda
- District: Lwengo District
- Elevation: 4,300 ft (1,300 m)

Population (2014 Census)
  - Total: 15,527

Lwengo is a town in Central Uganda. It is the chief municipal, administrative and commercial center of Lwengo District. It was known as Mbiriizi, prior to 1 July 2010.

== Location ==
Lwengo is located approximately 35 kilometres (22 mi), by road, west of Masaka, the largest city in the sub-region. This location lies approximately 165 kilometres (103 mi), by road, southwest of Kampala.

== Population ==
The 2014 national population census put the population of Lwengo Municipality at 15,527

== Points of interest ==
The following points of interest lie within the town limits:

- The headquarters of Lwengo District Administration
- The offices of Lwengo Town Council
- Lwengo Central Market - The largest source of fresh produce in the town
- The headquarters of Lwengo Microfinance Cooperative Society Limited (LWEMICOS)
