= Petrol-paraffin engine =

Dual-fuel Internal Combustion Engine

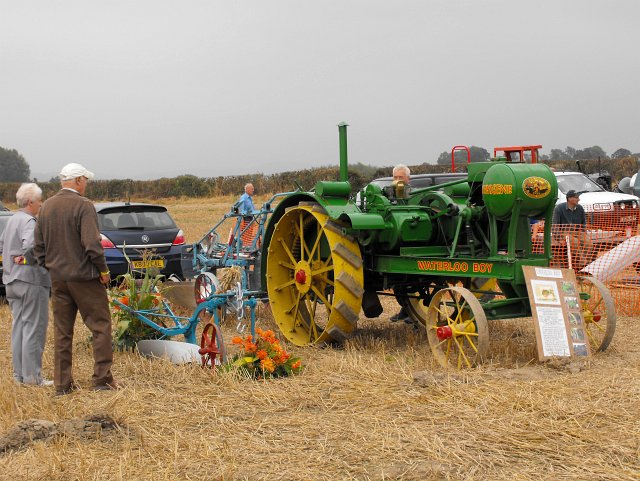
Waterloo Boy tractor produced by John Deere, 1919–1920. The tractor has a small petrol tank, used for starting the engine and a larger tank (at the front) for paraffin to run it.

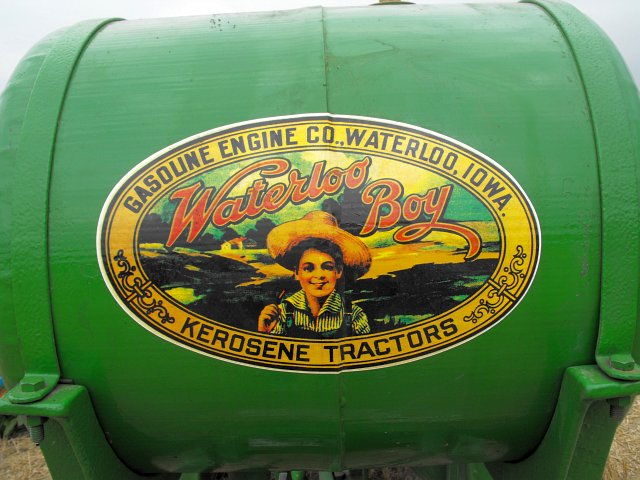
Paraffin (kerosene) tank on Waterloo Boy tractor

A petrol-paraffin engine, known as a TVO engine (United Kingdom) or gasoline-kerosene engine (North America), is an old-fashioned type of internal combustion engine with spark-ignition and a dual-fuel capability. Designed to start on petrol (gasoline), it can be switched to run on paraffin (kerosene) once the engine is warm. The grade of paraffin used is known as tractor vaporising oil in the UK and power kerosene in Australia.

== Advantages ==
Petrol-paraffin engines carry certain advantages, though time and technology has rendered them mostly outmoded.

1. Paraffin, historically, was cheaper and/or more readily available in certain markets, especially post-WWII Britain, a major market for the fuel.
2. Being less flammable, paraffin is safer to store.
3. Being less volatile, paraffin is less likely to go "stale" in the tank.

The cost and availability advantages, however, have become illusory with time; paraffin, once widely available as a cheap fuel, has become rarer and more expensive, particularly in developed countries. Also, while some older marine craft still use marine petrol-paraffin engines, more recent inboard marine powertrains now tend to be either marinised petrol engines, or various diesels, running on fuels as wide-ranging as plain road diesel to heavy fuel oils.

== Equipment ==
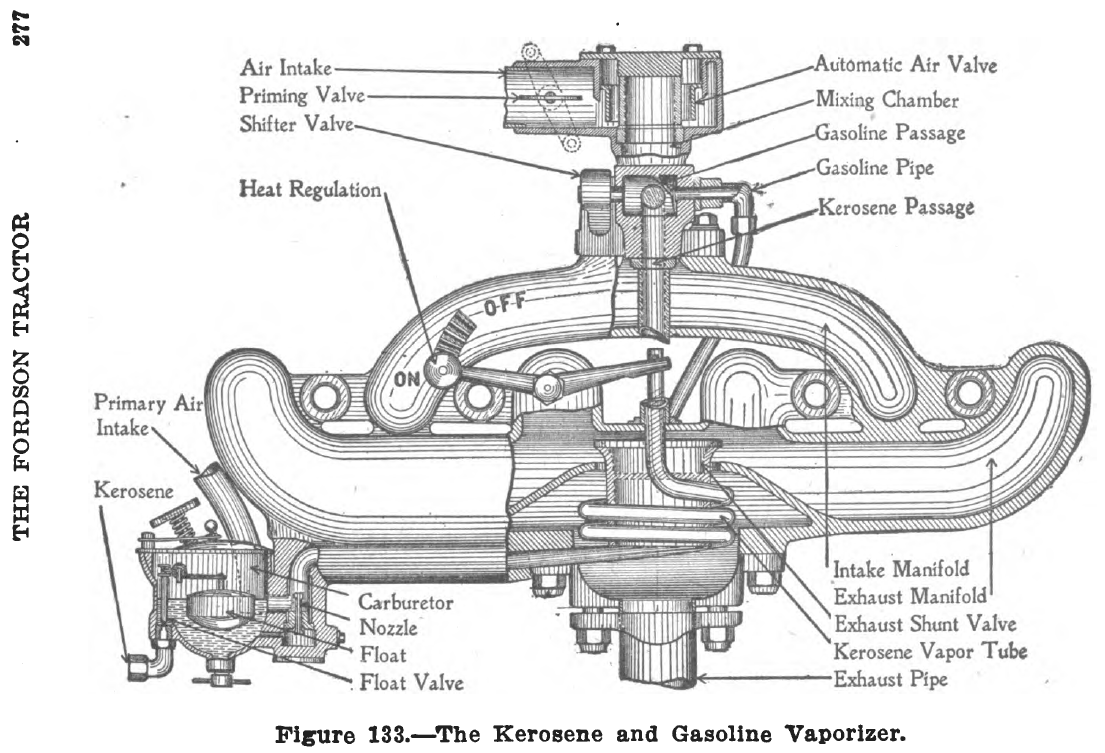
A cutaway view of the intake of the original Fordson tractor (including the intake manifold, vaporizer, carburetor, and fuel lines)

A petrol-paraffin engine differs from a single-fuel petrol engine in that two independent fuel tanks containing petrol and paraffin (respectively) are required, but both fuels may be supplied through the same carburetor or fuel injection system. An example of a fuel-injected petrol-paraffin engine is the Hesselman engine.

Paraffin is less volatile than petrol, and will not normally ignite at ambient temperatures, so the petrol-paraffin engine is started using petrol, and only when the engine has attained a sufficient operating temperature will the engine be switched to paraffin. This switching can be done manually or automatically. Some engines use a vaporizer, which uses heat from the exhaust manifold to vaporize the fuel entering the intake system.

== Applications ==
=== Traditional applications ===
Petrol-paraffin engines were traditionally found in motor boats, fishing vessels, small tractors, light railway locomotives, and stationary auxiliary engines, but not in cars or motorcycles.

The Milnes-Daimler motor bus of 1904 (based on the Cannstatt Daimler lorry), operated in London by Thomas Tilling, ran on either petrol or paraffin, but for starting the engine, or frequent stop-start work, petrol continuously was the preferable option. The airflow from the carburettor was heated by diverted exhaust gas.

== Design ==
Petrol-paraffin fuelling is suitable for four-stroke cycle piston engines and Wankel engines. A petrol/paraffin engine tends to run hotter whilst burning paraffin, and so the cooling system must be sufficiently robust. Being slower burning, the paraffin requires the longer combustion period that a four-stroke engine can provide; so two-stroke versions are rare. Although modern petrol engines may have compression ratios typically between 9:1 and 12:1, a petrol-paraffin engine requires a lower compression ratio of 8:1 or less, to avoid pre-ignition of the fuel-air mixture which would cause damage from engine knocking.

== Fuel ==
The fuel used in petrol-paraffin engines was known as tractor vaporising oil (TVO) in the United Kingdom and as power kerosene in Australia. TVO was withdrawn from sale by UK suppliers in 1974 but has been re-introduced by at least one supplier.

=== Naphthalene locomotive ===
A railway locomotive using solid naphthalene was built by Schneider-Creusot in France in 1913. It was a 70 bhp petrol-paraffin engine, but using solid naphthalene rather than paraffin, simply as a cheaper fuel. The naphthalene was melted and vaporised by a water jacket, heated by the engine.
