= Tractor vaporising oil =

Fuel for petrol-paraffin engines

Tractor vaporising oil (TVO) is a fuel for petrol-paraffin engines. It is seldom made or used today. In the United Kingdom and Australia, after the Second World War, it was commonly used for tractors until diesel engines became commonplace, especially from the 1960s onward. In Australian English it was known as power kerosene.

== History ==
TVO existed for at least fifteen years before it became widely used. A 1920 publication mentions it as a product of British Petroleum. But it was not until the late 1930s that it first became widely used. The post war Ferguson TE20 tractor, a carefully researched and near-ideal tractor for use on British farms, was designed around a petrol (gasoline) engine, the Standard inline-four. Although there was a campaign for the reintroduction of agricultural Road Duty (tax)-free petrol, which had been curtailed during the war, this was not forthcoming. Perkins Engines supplied some conversions into diesel engines which could use untaxed red diesel.

On the early Fordson model N, the tap which changed over from petrol to TVO was marked G for gasoline and K for kerosene, reflecting that these tractors had their design origin in the USA. In the UK tractor vaporising oil was usually called TVO.

== Octane rating ==
As a substitute for petrol, TVO was developed. Paraffin (kerosene) was commonly used as a domestic heating fuel and was untaxed. Paraffin has a low octane rating and would damage an engine built for petrol. The manufacture of paraffin involves the removal of aromatic hydrocarbons from what is now sold as heating oil. These aromatics have an octane rating, so adding some of that otherwise waste product material back in a controlled manner into paraffin gave TVO. The resulting octane rating of TVO was somewhere between 55 and 70.

Octane ratings of various fuels
Fuel	Octane rating	Notes
Petrol	98	-
Kerosene	15-20	-
Paraffin	0	-
Diesel fuel	0	-

Octane ratings of petrol/heating oil mixtures
Petrol (pbv)	Heating oil (pbv)	Octane rating
1	0	98
2	1	72
1	1	59
1	2	46
0	1	20

- pbv = parts by volume

The words paraffin and kerosene are often used interchangeably but the tables suggest that this is incorrect because they have different octane ratings. However, kerosene and heating oil have similar octane ratings. Paraffin, kerosene and petrol (gasoline) are all rather loosely defined. For example, gasoline may have an octane rating between 88 and 102.

== Engine modifications ==
=== Compression ratio ===
Because TVO has a lower octane rating than petrol, the engine needs a lower compression ratio. On the TVO version of the Ferguson TE20 tractor, the cylinder head was re-designed to reduce the compression ratio to 4.5:1. This reduced the power output, so the cylinder bore was increased to 85 mm to restore the power. The petrol version had a compression ratio of 5.77:1 and a cylinder bore of 80 mm on early versions..

=== Vaporiser ===
In practice TVO had most of the properties of paraffin, including the need for heating to encourage vapourisation. As a result, the exhaust and inlet manifolds were adapted so that more heat from the former warmed the latter. Such a setup was called a vaporiser. To get the tractor to start from cold, a small second fuel tank was added that contained petrol. The tractor was started on the expensive petrol, then – once the engine was warm – the fuel supply switched over to TVO or paraffin. So long as the engine was working hard, as when ploughing or pulling a load, the TVO would burn well. Under light conditions, such as travelling unloaded on the highway, the engine was better on petrol.

=== Radiator blind ===
Some tractor designs included a radiator "blind" that would restrict the flow of air over the radiator which led to the engine running hotter, which could help with starting. If the radiator blind was left shut, though, there was a risk of engine damage, especially in warm weather.

== Terminology ==
The phrase petrol-paraffin engine is often used to describe an engine that uses TVO. This can be interpreted either as

- the use of the two fuels, starting on petrol then switching to the paraffin-based TVO
- the use of a mixture of petrol and paraffin as a substitute for the proper TVO

== Supply ==
TVO was withdrawn from sale by UK suppliers in 1974. An approximation to the correct specification can be made from petrol and heating oil (burning oil). In the UK there is an exception that permits the use of rebated kerosene and fuel oils in vintage vehicles.

== North American distillate fuel ==
In North America a similar product, called distillate, was produced. Of lower quality than TVO, its octane rating varied between 33 and 45. Manufacture of tractors using distillate ended by 1956, when gasoline and diesel-engined tractors had captured the North American farming equipment market.
