= Lyantonde District =

- District
- District location in Uganda
- Coordinates: 00°25′S 31°10′E
- Country: Uganda
- Region: Central Uganda
- Established: 2007
- Capital: Lyantonde

Area
  - Land: 888.1 km^{2} (342.9 sq mi)
- Elevation: 1,260 m (4,130 ft)

Population (2012 Estimate)
  - Total: 80,200
  - Density: 90.3/km^{2} (234/sq mi)
- Time zone: UTC+3 (EAT)
- Website: www.lyantonde.go.ug

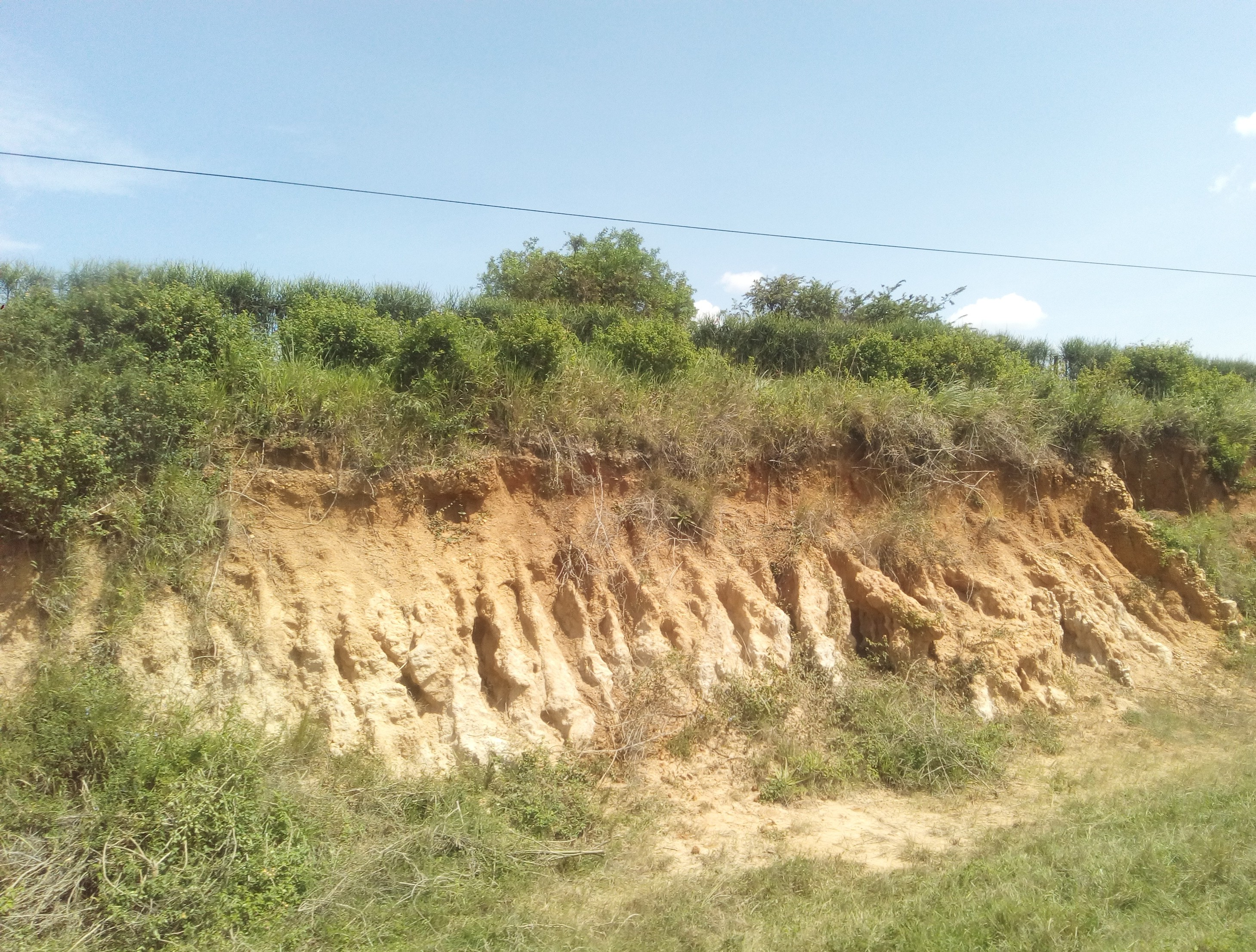
Soil Erosion in Lyantonde District.

Lyantonde District is a district in southern Central Uganda (Buganda). It is named after the 'chief town' of the district, Lyantonde, where the district headquarters are located.

== Location ==
Lyantonde District is bordered by Sembabule District to the north and northeast, Lwengo District to the east, Rakai District to the south, and Kiruhura District to the west. The 'chief town' of the district, Lyantonde, is located approximately 78 kilometres (48 mi) west of the city of Masaka, the largest metropolitan area in the sub-region. The coordinates of the district are: 00 25S, 31 10E.

== History ==
The district is composed of on one county, Kabula County. Prior to 2007, Kabula County was part of Rakai District. In 2007, the county was split off from Rakai District and given autonomous district status.

== Population ==
In 1991, the national population census estimated the population of the district at about 53,100. During the next census in 2002, the population of Lyantonde District was estimated at 66,000 with an annual population growth rate of 1.9%. In 2012 the district population was estimated at 80,200.

== Economic activities ==
Agriculture being the major source of livelihood for the population in Lyantonde District. A variety of crops are grown in the district, both for subsistence and economic purposes. The crops grown include:

- Sweet bananas
- Matooke
- Beans
- Maize
- Potatoes
- Cassava
- Sweet potatoes
- Millet
- Upland rice
- Sorghum
- Coffee
- Cassava
- Tobacco
- Vanilla
- Pineapples
- Mangoes
- Tomatoes
- Passion Fruit

Cattle are the main livestock kept by farmers in Lyantonde. It is estimated that there are 83,700 of cattle in the District. Other animals that are raised include goats, sheep, pigs and poultry.

== Community health ==
The district has a heavy disease burden. The most prevalent challenges include:

- Malaria
- Respiratory infections
- Diarrheal diseases
- Obstetric complications
- Maternal mortality
- HIV/AIDS

== See also ==
- Lyantonde
- Central Region, Uganda
- Districts of Uganda
