= Namayumba =

Namayumba Town Council Namayumba
- Town
- Location in Uganda
- Coordinates: 00°31′41″N 32°15′02″E
- Country: Uganda
- Region: Buganda Region
- District: Wakiso District
- County: Busiro
- Constituency: Busiro North

Government
  - Mayor: Kasenene
  - MP: Dennis Galabuzi Ssozi
- Elevation: 3,812 ft (1,162 m)

Population (2020 Estimate)
  - Total: 22,100

Namayumba is a settlement in the Wakiso District in the Buganda Region of Uganda. The name also refers to "Namayumba sub-county", the location of Namayumba settlement.

== Location ==
Namayumba sits on the planned Kampala–Busunju Expressway, a part of the Kampala–Hoima Road. The town is approximately 47 kilometres (29 mi), northwest of the national capital, Kampala.

The nearest large town to Namayumba is Busunju, in Mityana District, which is about 7 kilometres (4 mi) to the northwest of Namayumba along the Kampala–Hoima Road. The geographical coordinates of Namayumba are:0°31'41.0"N, 32°15'02.0"E (Latitude:0.528056; Longitude:32.250556). Namayumba sits at an average elevation of 1,162 metres (3,812 ft) above mean sea level.

== Population ==
During the national census and household survey of 27 and 28 August 2014, the Uganda Bureau of Statistics (UBOS), enumerated the population of Namayumba Town Council at 15,205 people.

In 2015, UBOS estimated the population of Namayumba at 16,000. In 2020, the population agency estimated the mid-year population of the town at 22,100 people. Of these, 11,100 (50.2 percent) were females and 11,000 (49.8 percent) were males. UBOS calculated the average population growth rate of Namayumba at 6.67 percent per annum between 2015 and 2020.

== Points of interest ==
- Robert Kabushenga, the CEO of the New Vision Limited maintains a personal agricultural farm in Namayumba sub-county.
- Namayumba Health Centre IV is operated by Wakiso District Local Government, and as of July 2016, was in poor state.
- The offices of Namayumba Town Council.

== See also ==
- List of cities and towns in Uganda
