= Kamuli Mission Hospital =

- Uganda Catholic Medical Bureau

Geography
- Location: Kamuli, Kamuli District, Eastern Region, Uganda
- Coordinates: 00°55′55″N 33°07′46″E

Organisation
- Care system: Private
- Type: Community

Services
- Emergency department: I
- Beds: 160

History
- Founded: 1940

Links
- Other links: Hospitals in Uganda

Kamuli Mission Hospital, is a hospital in Kamuli District, in Eastern Uganda. It is a private, community hospital, serving the town of Kamuli and surrounding areas of Kamuli District. The hospital is sometimes referred to as Lubaga Mission Hospital at Kamuli.

== Location ==
The hospital is located in the town of Kamuli, approximately 2.5 kilometres (2 mi) south of the government-owned Kamuli General Hospital. This location is approximately 63 kilometres (39 mi), by road, north of Jinja Regional Referral Hospital, in Jinja, the largest city in the Busoga sub-region. The geographical coordinates of Kamuli Mission Hospital are: 00°55'55.0"N, 33°07'46.0"E (Latitude:0.931944; Longitude:33.129444).

== Overview ==
Kamuli Mission Hospital is a private, non-profit, community hospital owned by the Roman Catholic Diocese of Jinja and is accredited by the Uganda Catholic Medical Bureau. The hospital is administered by the Little Sisters of St. Francis. The planned bed-capacity of the hospital is 160. However, often, more than 200 patients are admitted, with some (especially children), sharing beds and others sleeping on the floor. The hospital was constructed in the 1940s, although it has undergone several renovations since.

The hospital operates on income derived from patient fees, donations and intermittent government subsidies. However, no patient is turned away because of inability to pay. The hospital staff operate in an environment of limited resources and great demand for health services.

== Hospital profile ==
The hospital was established in 1940. It has an average annual outpatient load of 48,136 contacts and 11,470 annual admissions. The bed occupation rate for the hospital is 72 percent on average. The hospital averages 1,931 annual maternal deliveries with a caesarian rate of 28 percent. Patient user fees account for about 40.3 percent of total Hospital annual income, while Government subsidies accounts for about 32.8 percent on average. The hospital owns and maintains the adjacent St. Joseph’s Midwifery Training School, which was established in 1950 and admits 40-50 students annually.

== See also ==
- Hospitals in Uganda
