= Kamuli–Bukungu Road =

Ugandan road

Route information
- Length: 42 mi (68 km)
- History: Designated in 2021; Completion in 2024

Major junctions
- South end: Kamuli
- Nawantale; Iringa; Kidera
- North end: Bukungu

Location
- Country: Uganda

Highway system
- Roads in Uganda

The Kamuli–Bukungu Road is a road in the Eastern Region of Uganda, connecting the towns of Kamuli in Kamuli District to Bukungu in Buyende District, on the shores of Lake Kyoga, adjacent to where the Victoria Nile enters that lake. This road, together with the connecting Jinja-Kamuli-Mbulamuti Road, forms a continuous transport corridor, connecting the northern shores of Lake Nalubaale to the southern shores of Lake Kyoga.

== Location ==
The road starts in Kamuli town and travels in a general northwesterly direction through Nawantale, Iringa, and Kidera to end at Bukungu, approximately 68 kilometres (42 mi) northwest of Kamuli. The geographical coordinates of the road at the town of Iringa are: 01°16'18.0"N, 33°01'44.0"E (Latitude:1.271667; Longitude:33.028889).

== Overview ==
This is a rural road that passes through some of the poorest neighborhoods in the country. As of July 2021, the entire road is gravel surface in various stages of disrepair. During the dry season, it is potholed and dusty. Then when it rains the road is slippery, gullied and muddy. This road has been on the to-do list of the government of Uganda since 2001, but tarmacking has not been done.

== Upgrade to bitumen surface ==
In 2021 the Uganda National Roads Authority (UNRA) began the process of procuring a contractor to improve the road to class II bitumen standard, with shoulders, culverts and drainage channels. UNRA views the entire 129 kilometres (80 mi) Jinja-Bukungu Road as one project. However, UNRA will tender the Jinja-Kamuli section separately from the Kamuli-Bukungu section; two separate contractors will be hired.
