= Namasagali College =

Coordinates: 1.0118°N 32.9490°E

- Namasagali, Kamuli District; Uganda

Information
- Type: Public high school
- Motto: Strive regardless.
- Established: 1965
- Faculty: 32
- Enrollment: 840 (2009)
- Athletics: Soccer, rugby, track, tennis, volleyball, and basketball

Namasagali College is a mixed boarding middle and high school located in Kamuli District in Eastern Uganda.

== Location ==
The school is situated on a 496-acre (201 ha) campus at Namasagali, approximately 25 kilometres (16 mi), by road, northwest of the town of Kamuli, where the district headquarters are located. The school campus sits on the eastern shores of the Victoria Nile, between Lake Victoria and Lake Kyoga. This location is approximately 90 kilometres (56 mi), by road, north of Jinja, the nearest large city. The coordinates of the college campus are: Latitude:1.0118N; Longitude:32.9490E.

== History ==
Namasagali College was established in 1965, as Kamuli College, located in Kamuli, at the premises now occupied by Busoga High School. Later that same year the school was relocated to its present location in premises that previously had facilities of a railway harbor. The school was renamed "Namasagali College" in the early 1970s. At first, the school was a joint venture between the Busoga Kingdom and the Mill Hill Fathers of the Roman Catholic Church. Busoga provided the infrastructure, while the Mill Hill Fathers provided administrative leadership. The first two headteachers were Mill Hill fathers: Father Navel (1965–1966) and Father Damian Grimes, MBE (1967–2000). This arrangement was terminated in 2001, following the departure of Father Grimes; the school became a public school, under the administration of the Ministry of Education.

== Reputation ==
During the 1960s through the early 1980s Namasagali College was a prestigious middle and high school, sought after by the best students in Uganda. Over the years, the school has fallen into physical disrepair and its academic performance has declined. There are current efforts by the students alumni association to revive the school infrastructure and improve academic performance.

== Academics ==
The college offers both "Ordinary Level" (O-Level) and "Advanced Level" (A-Level) courses.

== Notable alumni ==
Notable alumni of Namasagali College include the following:

- Patrick Bitature – Ugandan entrepreneur, businessman and hotelier
- Joy Kabatsi – lawyer, farmer and politician
- Rebecca Kadaga – speaker of the Ugandan Parliament, 2011–2021
- Juliana Kanyomozi – Ugandan recording artist
- Miria Matembe – Uganda Minister of Ethics and Integrity, 1998–2003
- Charles Mbire – chairman, MTN Uganda and Eskom Uganda
- Isaac Musumba – Uganda's former State Minister for Regional Affairs, 2006–2011
- Kasha Nabagesera – LGBTQ rights activist
- Iryn Namubiru – Ugandan-born performing artist, resident of Paris, France
- Robert Kabushenga – Ugandan lawyer and business executive
- Moses Kizige – Ugandan politician
- Asuman Kiyingi – Ugandan lawyer and politician

== See also ==
- Education in Uganda
