= Buwenge General Hospital =

- Uganda Ministry of Health

Geography
- Location: Buwenge, Jinja District, Eastern Region, Uganda
- Coordinates: 00°39′02″N 33°10′15″E

Organisation
- Care system: Public
- Type: General

Services
- Emergency department: I
- Beds: 200

History
- Founded: 2020 (Expected)

Links
- Other links: Hospitals in Uganda

Buwenge General Hospital, also Buwenge Hospital, is a hospital under construction in the Eastern Region of Uganda.

== Location ==
Buwenge General Hospital would be located in the town of Buwenge, in Magamaga Parish, in Buwenge sub-county, Kagoma county, in Jinja District. This is approximately 28 kilometres (17 mi) north of Jinja Regional Referral Hospital and 109 kilometres (68 mi) northwest of Mulago National Referral Hospital.

== Overview ==
As far back as 2008, the Jinja District Administration began preparation for the construction of a general hospital in the district, with funds sourced from the government of China. When those plans collapsed, the Uganda Ministry of Health allocated Sh17 billion for the construction of the hospital in Buwenge on 15 acres (6 ha), with the construction broken down in phases.

In 2013, the government of Uganda, borrowed US$195 million from the World Bank to construct, renovate and equip certain hospitals and health centers, including Buwenge General Hospital. The specific items to be constructed at the hospital included:

- Construction of new buildings consisting of a double-storied T-Block to house patient wards
- Build a new, larger, outpatient department
- Build an emergency department (casualty department)
- Build a hospital administration block
- Build a house to accommodate the diesel generator for electricity
- Build a placenta disposal facility
- Build a bio-medical waste disposal facility
- Build six new staff residences
- Build a laundry facility for patients' families
- Build a kitchen and dining room for patients' families
- Build ventilated, improved, pit latrines for patients' families and outpatients.

== See also ==
- List of hospitals in Uganda
