= Namasagali =

- Location in Uganda
- Coordinates: 01°00′45″N 32°57′00″E
- Country: Uganda
- Region: Eastern Region
- District: Kamuli District
- Elevation: 3,480 ft (1,060 m)

Namasagali is a town in Eastern Uganda. It is one of the metropolitan areas in Kamuli District.

== Location ==
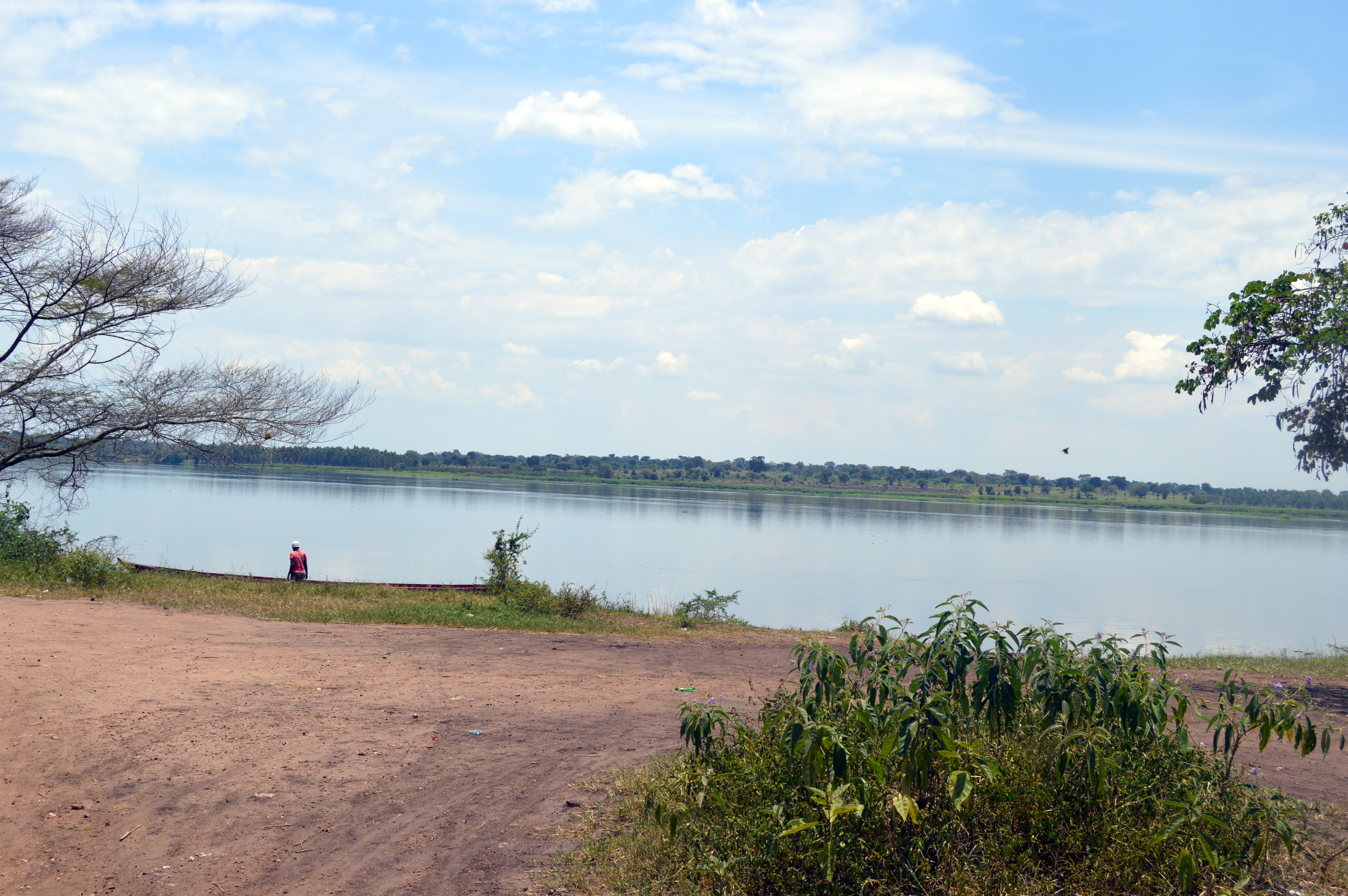
Namasagali landing site

The town is located in the northwestern part of Kamuli District, along the eastern bank of the Victoria Nile, approximately 25 kilometres (16 mi), by road, northwest of Kamuli, where the district headquarters are located. This location is approximately 89 kilometres (55 mi), by road, north of Jinja, the largest city in the sub-region. The coordinates of Namasagali are:01 00 45N, 32 57 00E (Latitude:1.0125; Longitude:32.9500).

== Population ==
As of February 2010, the exact population of Namasagali is not known.

== Landmarks ==
The landmarks within the town limits or close to its borders include:

- The offices of Kamuli Town Council
- Namasagali Central Market - The largest fresh-produce market in the town
- The Namasagali Campus of Busitema University - One of the forty (40) public and private universities in Uganda.
- Namasagali College - A private, mixed, residential high school

== See also ==
- Kamuli
- Kamuli District
- Busitema University
- Namasagali College
