= Kamuli Sugar Limited =

Sugar manufacturer in Uganda

Coordinates: 00°51′07″N 33°07′34″E

- Company type: Private
- Industry: Manufacture & Marketing of Sugar
- Founded: 2010
- Headquarters: Kamuli District, Uganda
- Products: Sugar
- Website: Homepage

Kamuli Sugar Limited (KSL), is a sugar-manufacturing company in Uganda.

== Location ==
The factory and company headquarters are located on the Jinja-Kamuli-Mbulamuti Road, about 12 kilometres (7 mi) south of the town of Kamuli, where the district headquarters are located. The coordinates of the company headquarters are: 0°51'07.0"N, 33°07'34.0"E (Latitude:0.851955; Longitude:33.126103). The company is a member of the Millers Association of Sugarcane, a nationwide industry group of small sugar manufacturers in Uganda.

== Overview ==
Kamuli Sugar Limited, founded in 2010, is a member of the Pramukh Group of Companies, which includes Pramukh Steel Limited, founded in 2007, and Ajay Cotton Limited, founded in 2009.

== See also ==
- List of sugar manufacturers in Uganda
- Kamuli District
