= Ssozi =

Ssozi is a surname. Notable people with the surname include:

- Dennis Galabuzi Ssozi, Ugandan civil engineer
- Phillip Ssozi (born 1982), Ugandan footballer
