= Buwenge =

Ugandan town

- Location in Uganda
- Coordinates: 00°39′01″N 33°10′13″E
- Country: Uganda
- Region: Eastern Uganda
- Sub-region: Busoga sub-region
- District: Jinja District
- Elevation: 3,540 ft (1,080 m)

Population (2024 Census)
  - Total: 30,377

Buwenge is a town in the Eastern Region of Uganda. It was proposed as the headquarters of Jinja District in 2009 when local district leaders were lobbying government to grant Jinja city status. However, when the district headquarters were relocated 10 years later, Kagoma, a smaller community in Buwenge sub-county was selected as the new district headquarters.

== Location ==
The town is bordered by Luzinga to the northeast, Butamira to the southeast, Mabira to the south, Mawoito to the west and Kiroro to the north. Buwenge is situated on the Jinja–Kamuli–Mbulamuti Road, approximately 28 kilometres (17 mi), by road, north of Jinja, the largest city in the Busoga sub-region. This is about 37 kilometres (23 mi), by road, south of the town of Kamuli. The coordinates of Buwenge Town are: 0°39'01.0"N, 33°10'13.0"E (Latitude:0.650278; Longitude:33.170278).

== Population ==
In 2014, the national census and population survey put the population of the town at 22,074. In 2020, the Uganda Bureau of Statistics estimated the mid-year population of Buwenge Town at 24,200. Buwenge has a Population Density of 698.7 / km^{2}.

== Points of interest ==
The following points of interest are found within the limits of the town or close to its orders:

1. The headquarters of Jinja District Administration are located at Kagoma, in Buwenge Sub-county of Kagoma County, in Jinja District.

2. The offices of Buwenge Town Council

3. Buwenge General Hospital - A 200-bed public hospital administered by the Uganda Ministry of Health

4. Buwenge Central Market

5. The Jinja–Kamuli–Mbulamuti Road passes through the middle of town in a north to south direction.

== See also ==
- Hospitals in Uganda
- List of cities and towns in Uganda
