= Jinja–Kamuli–Mbulamuti Road =

Road in Uganda

Coordinates: 00°39′16″N 33°10′01″E

Route information
- Length: 53 mi (85 km)
- History: Designated in 2012; Completion in 2016

Major junctions
- South end: Jinja
- Buwenge
- North end: Kamuli

Location
- Country: Uganda

Highway system
- Roads in Uganda

Jinja–Kamuli–Mbulamuti Road is a road in Eastern Uganda, connecting the towns of Jinja in Jinja District and Kamuli in Kamuli District. A spur of the road extends from Kamuli to Mbulamuti on the shores of the Victoria Nile.

== Location ==
The road starts in Jinja, the largest town in Busoga sub-region. The road travels in a general northward direction through Buwenge, Nawanyago and Naminage, to end at Kamuli, approximately 63 kilometres (39 mi) north of Jinja. A spur, measuring approximately 16 kilometres (9.9 mi) extends southwest from Kamuli to Mbulamuti, on the eastern shores of the Victoria Nile.

== Overview ==
This road, parts of which have been gravel surfaced with other parts in various stages of deteriorating tarmac surface, has over the years, undergone periodic remedial repairs to preserve operability.

Due to the road's poor surface, it is potholed and dusty when it is dry. During the rainy season, the road is muddy, gullied and slippery. The government of Uganda has voiced plans to tarmac this road, but without carrying out the task, since 2001.

== Upgrade to bitumen surface ==
In April 2021, Uganda National Roads Authority (UNRA) began the process of procuring a contractor to improve the road to class II bitumen standard, with shoulders, culverts and drainage channels. UNRA views the entire 129 kilometres (80 mi) Jinja-Bukungu Road as one project. However, UNRA will tender the Jinja-Kamuli Road section separately from the Kamuli–Bukungu Road section. Therefore two separate contractors will be hired.

== See also ==
- List of roads in Uganda
