= Joy Kabatsi =

Ugandan lawyer, farmer and politician (born 1954)

- Born: 1 February 1954 (age 72); Uganda
- Education: University of Dar es Salaam (LL.B.); Law Development Centre (Diploma in Legal Practice)
- Occupations: Lawyer, farmer & politician
- Years active: 1986–present
- Title: State Minister for Transport, Cabinet of Uganda

Joy Kabatsi, also Joy Kabatsi Kafura (born 1 February 1954), is a Ugandan lawyer, farmer and politician. As of January 2020, she was the State Minister of Transport in the Cabinet of Uganda, effective December 2019. She belongs to National Resistance Movement political party.

Before that, from 6 June 2016 until 14 December 2019, she served as the State Minister for Animal Industry in the Ugandan Cabinet. She replaced Bright Rwamirama, who was dropped from Cabinet. On account of her ministerial position, she is an ex-officio member of the 10th Parliament (2016 to 2021).

== Background and education ==
She was born in Sembabule District, in Buganda, Uganda, on 1 February 1954. She attended Bweranyangi Girls' Senior Secondary School for her O-Level education. She transferred to Namasagali College for her A-Level studies, graduating in 1973. She studied at the University of Dar es Salaam, graduating in with a Bachelor of Laws in 1981. Later, she obtained a Diploma in Legal Practice from the Law Development Centre.

== Career ==
She began her career in 1982, as a Staff Training Officer at the National Institute of Public Administration, in Lusaka, Zambia, serving in that capacity until 1987. From 1987 until 1988, she worked as the Administrator at World University Service International, also in Lusaka, Zambia. She returned to her native Uganda in 1988 and worked at the Ministry of Finance, Planning and Economic Development (Uganda), on secondment from the World Bank.

In 1997 she transferred to the Uganda Revenue Authority (URA), and worked there until 2001, as their Principal Revenue Officer (Legal). From 2002 until 2004, she served as the Executive Assistant to the Commissioner General at URA. From there, she moved to the Office of the President, serving as the Head of the Legal Department, from 2009 until 2012. Immediately prior to her appointment, Kabatsi was a commercial dairy farmer. She has been the Managing Director of Entuutsi Rural Enterprise Limited', since 2005.

She has unsuccessfully contested for the Sembabule District Women's Representative in the Parliament of Uganda, in three consecutive election cycles. On 6 June 2016, she was appointed State Minister for Animal Industry.

== See also ==
- Cabinet of Uganda
- Parliament of Uganda
