= Isaac Musumba =

Ugandan lawyer and politician

Hon Musumba Isaac Isanga
- Born: 16 December 1961 (age 64); Uganda
- Citizenship: Uganda
- Education: Makerere University (Bachelor of Laws) (Master of Laws); Law Development Centre (Diploma in Legal Practice)
- Occupations: Lawyer & Politician
- Years active: 1985 — present
- Known for: Politics
- Title: Former MP For Buzaaya County
- Spouse: Salaamu Musumba

Musumba Isaac Isanga (born 16 December 1961) is a Ugandan lawyer and politician. He served as the State Minister for Regional Foreign Affairs, from June 2006 until May 2011. In the cabinet reshuffle on 27 May 2011, he was dropped from the cabinet and was replaced by Asuman Kiyingi. He also served as the elected Member of Parliament (MP), representing "Buzaaya County", Kamuli District, from 1996 until 2011. During the 2011 national elections, he lost to Muzaale Martin Kisule Mugabi, during the National Resistance Movement (NRM) primaries. In 2016, he bounced back into the 10th parliament (2016 - 2021), representing Buzaaya County, in Kamuli District, on the NRM ticket. In the 2021 elections, he lost in the NRM primaries to Martin Muzaale and decided to contest as an Independent candidate and further lost to the NRM’s flag bearer, Muzaale Martin Kisule Mugabi.

== Background and education ==
Musumba was born in Kamuli District, on 16 December 1961. He attended Jinja College for his O-Level education. He transferred to Namasagali College for his A-Level studies, graduating with a High School Diploma in 1980.

He holds a Bachelor of Laws (LLB) degree, from Makerere University, Uganda's oldest and largest public university. He went on to obtain a Diploma in Legal Practice, from the Law Development Center, in Kampala, Uganda's capital city. His degree of Master of Laws (LLM), specializing in tax law, was also awarded by Makerere University, in 1992.

== Career ==
From 1985 until 1991, Isaac Musumba worked as a principal legal officer in the Ministry of Finance. He then worked as the Administrative Commissioner, at the Uganda Revenue Authority from 1991 until 1993.

In 1994, he was elected to the Constituent Assembly that drafted the 1995 Ugandan Constitution, serving in that capacity until 1995. He was elected to the Ugandan Parliament in 1996, to represent "Buzaaya County", Kamuli District. He was re-elected in 2001 and in 2006. He lost the seat in 2011 to the Martin Muzaale incumbent Member of Parliament.

In 2001, he was appointed State Minister for Planning. He retained his post in a Cabinet reshuffle on 14 January 2005. In June 2006, Isaac Musumba was appointed State Minister for Foreign Affairs (Regional Affairs), serving in that capacity until May 2011, when he was dropped from the cabinet in a reshuffle.

== See also ==
- Parliament of Uganda
- Cabinet of Uganda
- Kamuli District
