= Kampala–Busunju Expressway =

Road in Uganda

Coordinates: 00°27′21″N 32°20′07″E

Route information
- Length: 35 mi (56 km)
- History: Designated in 2017 (Expected); Expected completion in 2020

Major junctions
- South end: Namungoona
- Nansana; Wakiso; Kakiri
- North end: Busunju

Location
- Country: Uganda

Highway system
- Roads in Uganda

Kampala–Busunju Expressway is a planned road in the Central Region of Uganda. The road would connect the county's capital city, Kampala, to the town of Busunju in Mityana District.

== Location ==
The expressway would start at the Namungoona roundabout on the Kampala Northern Bypass Highway and proceed in a northwesterly direction through Nansana, Wakiso and Kakiri in Wakiso District, to end at Busunju, in Mityana District, a distance of approximately 56 kilometres (35 mi).

== Background ==
The proposed expressway forms part of Kampala–Hoima Road. As at February 2016, the existing road between Kampala and Busunju is a bitumen-surfaced, two lane road in deteriorating condition. The road is congested and accident prone.

== Expansion to expressway ==
As part of efforts to decongest Kampala, and as part of efforts to develop road infrastructure to the oil-rich Albertine region, the government of Uganda plans to expand this road from two lanes to a four-lane dual carriageway. Bids have been advertised for a consultant to carry out a feasibility study, design the expressway and perform an environment impact assessment. A public-private partnership arrangement is planned in developing and funding the expressway.
