= Moses Kizige =

Ugandan politician

Moses Kawaluuko Kizige
- Born: Kamuli District, Uganda
- Citizenship: Uganda
- Education: Namasagali College, Makerere University, University of Notre Dame
- Occupations: Politician, Minister of State, Ambassador, Accountant, Diplomat
- Years active: 1996–present
- Known for: Politics, Diplomat, Accounting
- Spouse: Betty Kizige
- Parent(s): Yowabu Magada Kawaluuko (7 Jan 1930 – 29 Jul 2016), Ruth Mercy Tabingwa (14 July 1937 – 9 May 1979)

Moses Kizige is a Ugandan politician, diplomat and accountant who has served in several high-profile government and diplomatic positions. He is the former State Minister for Karamoja in the Ugandan Cabinet. He served in that position from 6 June 2016 to 2021 when he was appointed Ambassador of Uganda to Russia a position he currently holds. Kizige also served as the elected member of parliament, representing Bugabula North Constituency, in Kamuli District, in the 10th Parliament of Uganda (2016–2021).

== Early life and education ==
He was born to Yowabu Magada Kawaluuko and Ruth Mercy Tabingwa in Kamuli District, Busoga sub-region, in the Eastern Region of Uganda.

He attended Namasagali College and later studied at Makerere University, Uganda's oldest and most prestigious university where he trained in accounting and related disciplines before entering public service. He undertook postgraduate studies at the University of Notre Dame in Indiana, U.S.

== Political career ==
Kizige first entered elective politics in 1996, when he was elected Member of Parliament (MP) for Bugabula North Constituency in Kamuli District representing the National Resistance Movement (NRM) political party. He is an active community leader in his home district. He represented his current parliamentary constituency between 1996 until 2006 but lost during the 2006 general election. Between 2006 and 2016 he served as Senior Presidential Advisor on Foreign Affairs. On 6 June 2016, he was appointed State Minister for Karamoja.

After leaving parliament in 2006, Kizige was appointed Senior Presidential Advisor on Foreign Affairs a role in which he worked on matters of international diplomacy and political strategy for the Government of Uganda for a decade.

In the 2016 general elections, he regained his parliamentary seat for Bugabula North Constituency and subseguently was appointed State Minister for Karamoja Affairs in the Office of the Prime Minister on 6 June 2016 becoming responsible for policy and implementation regarding the socio-economic development of the Karamoja sub-region.

== Diplomatic service ==
After 2021 general elections and new government formation, Moses Kizige was appointed ambassador of Uganda to Russia, based in Moscow where he presented his credentials and serves as Uganda's chief diplomatic representative in the Russian Federation.

While Moscow he has participated in strengthening bilateral relations, including attending trips and diplomaic meetings to foster cooperation in trade, education and cultural exchange. He has also been involved in expanding relationships under frameworks such as the BRICS partnership engagement.

In 2024, he was accredited as Uganda's first Ambassador to Uzbekistan marking a diplomatic milstone and further extension of Uganda's diplomatic footprint in Central Asia.

== Other incidents ==
In early 2024 around January, an accident involving the vehicle in which Ambassador Kizige was traveling resulted in the death of a boda boda rider, with Kizige himself surviving without injury. Police attributes the collision to reckless riding by the motorcyclist.

== Personal life ==
Moses Kizige is married to Betty Kizige. His father Yowabu Magada Kawaluuko was a noted educator and politician from Kamuli District.

== See also ==
- Cabinet of Uganda
- Parliament of Uganda
