= Gloria Kamba =

Ugandan journalist and radio presenter

- Born: July 18
- Citizenship: Uganda
- Occupation: Journalist

Gloria Kamba (born on July 18) is a Ugandan radio personality who was the first presenter of the 88.2 Sanyu FM weekday breakfast show "The Early Riser" and the Sunday mid morning show "The Intimate Connection" She is recognized as one of the original female FM radio stars in Uganda.

In the 1980s, she was known as Gloria Nekesa while at Namasagali College.

== Background ==
She is currently living in the UK.
