= Kamuli General Hospital =

- Uganda Ministry of Health
- Location within Uganda

Geography
- Location: Kamuli, Kamuli District, Busoga sub-region, Uganda
- Coordinates: 00°56′50″N 33°07′16″E

Organisation
- Care system: Public
- Type: General

Services
- Emergency department: I
- Beds: 100

History
- Founded: 2000

Links
- Other links: Hospitals in Uganda

Kamuli General Hospital, also Kamuli District Hospital or Kamuli Government Hospital is a hospital in Kamuli, in Kamuli District, in the Eastern Region of Uganda. It is a public hospital, owned by the Ugandan Government and is administered by the Uganda Ministry of Health.

== Location ==
This hospital is located in the central business district of te town of Kamuli, about 63 kilometres (39 mi), by road, north of Jinja Regional Referral Hospital, the regional, public referral hospital. The coordinates of Kamuli General Hospital are: 0°56'50.0"N, 33°07'16.0"E (Latitude:0.947223; Longitude:33.121106).

== Overview ==
Kamuli Hospital is a public hospital owned by the Uganda Government and administered by the Uganda Ministry of Health. Kamuli Hospital has a planned bed capacity of 100. However, many more patients are admitted with some sharing beds of sleeping on the floor. The hospital offers services in an environment of great challenges, including corruption, inadequate staffing, poor remuneration, insufficient medication and antiquated medical equipment.

== See also ==
- List of hospitals in Uganda
