= Yowabu Magada Kawaluuko =

Ugandan educator politician

Chairman of Uganda People's Congress

Personal details
- Born: 7 January 1930 Nabirumba, Kamuli, Uganda
- Died: 29 July 2016 (aged 86) Kampala, Uganda
- Spouses: Ruth Mercy Tabingwa (m. 1956; died 1979); Monica Mukoda (m. 1980; died 2016)
- Children: 20, including Moses
- Education: Bishop Willis Teacher Training College

Yowabu (Joab) Magada Kawaluuko (7 January 1930 – 29 July 2016), was a Ugandan educator and politician. He served as the Chairman of Uganda People's Congress in charge of Greater Kamuli District, in the first and second Uganda People's Congress (UPC) governments of the Republic of Uganda. He was a founder member of the Uganda National Congress, which eventually became the UPC, under Apollo Obote. He also served on the National Executive Committee between 1980 and 1985. He was a practicing Anglican Christian.

== Early life ==
Yowabu Magada Kawaluuko, nicknamed "Commander," was born on 7 January 1930 to Enos Muwalu Kizige, a farmer, and Amina Kawala Namusubo Tibagonzeka, a housewife, in Nabirumba village, Kamuli District, Uganda. Kawaluuko attended Nabirumba Church Of Uganda Primary School, after which he went to Balawoli, Kaliro, and then to Namulikya where he sat his Primary Leaving Examinations.

He went on to attend Bishop Willis Teacher Training College and later to Kaliro where he trained as vernacular teacher in 1951. Upon qualifying, Kawaluuko taught in Kagulu, became Deputy Head teacher in Kigingi and Head teacher in Nsale, Irundu, Bugaya, Buyende and Nabirumba, he rose from a grade 3 teacher, to deputy and then head teacher, in quick succession before his retirement in 1993 at the age of 63.

== Personal life ==
Kawaluuko was married twice, first in 1956 to Ruth Mercy Tabingwa Kawaluuko (14 July 1937 – 9 May 1979 her death) and later to Monica Mukoda Kawaluuko (M;1980–2016).

== Death and afterward ==
In late 2015, Kawaluuko was diagnosed with testicular cancer, which was too advanced to completely clear on treatment. He died in Kampala on 30 July 2016, having collapsed on the way to Kampala International Hospital, for a routine check up in relation to complications of a recently discovered tumour in his right ear.

His death led to complete out pouring of grief seen in the tens of thousands of people that descended on Nabirumba village, Kamuli, Uganda to pay their last respects, effectively turning the place into a temporary shrine.

Following a thanks giving service at Saint Andrew's church Bukoto in Kamapala on 3 August, Kawaluuko was laid to rest on Thursday 4 August 2016 in his ancestral home of Nabirumba. His funeral was attended by high ranking state officials, the clergy and the judiciary, including 12 government ministers led by the Deputy Prime Minister Kirunda Kivejinja and 30 members of parliament, three judges and three bishops were all in attendance, which was fitting given his contribution and position as one of the most influential Ugandan politicians in the 60 years leading up to his death.

== Philosophical and/or political views ==
Kawaluuko was a strong supporter of Uganda Peoples Congress and The National Resistance Movement in his late years. He was a Christian by faith.
