= Juliet Muzoora =

Ugandan educator and administrator

Muzoora Juliet
- Other name: Atuhaire
- Citizenship: Ugandan
- Education: Bachelor of Arts in Education, Masters in Education
- Occupations: Teacher, commissioner of Secondary Education
- Organization(s): Ministry of Education and Sports
- Predecessor: Sam Kuloba

Muzoora Juliet Atuhaire is a Ugandan teacher. She serves as the commissioner of secondary education at the Ministry of Education and Sports. She has served as a headteacher at schools including Bweranyangi Girls' Senior Secondary School, Bwongyera Girls' Secondary school, Kinyasano Girls' School and Mwengura Secondary School.

== Education background ==
Muzoora studied at Kitunga Central School (which was renamed to Kitunga Day and Boarding Primary School) in Ntungamo district in 1977 where she completed her primary education in 1983 with 11 aggregates. She was admitted at Bweranyangi Girls' Senior Secondary School, a school in Bushenyi District, Western Uganda where she completed both her Ordinary level in 1987 and her Advanced level studies.

In 1990, Muzoora was admitted at Makerere University for a Bachelor of Arts in Education with Literature and English Language and in 1993, she graduated. In 1998, she enrolled again at Makerere University for a Masters of Education. She graduated in 2001.

== Career ==
Muzoora started her career as a teacher in 1993 after graduating from Makerere University at Bweranyangi Girls' Senior Secondary School, where, between 2006 and 2010, she became the chairman of the contracts committee and the deputy headteacher. In 2011, she became the headteacher of Mwengura Secondary School and deputy headteacher of Kinyasano Girls' School. In 2012, Muzoora was the headteacher of Bwongyera Girls' Secondary School, found in Ntungamo District. In 2017, she returned to Bweranyangi Girls' Senior Secondary School as the headteacher until 2024, when she was appointed to be the commissioner of secondary education at the Ministry of Education and Sports.
