= Asuman Kiyingi =

Ugandan lawyer and politician

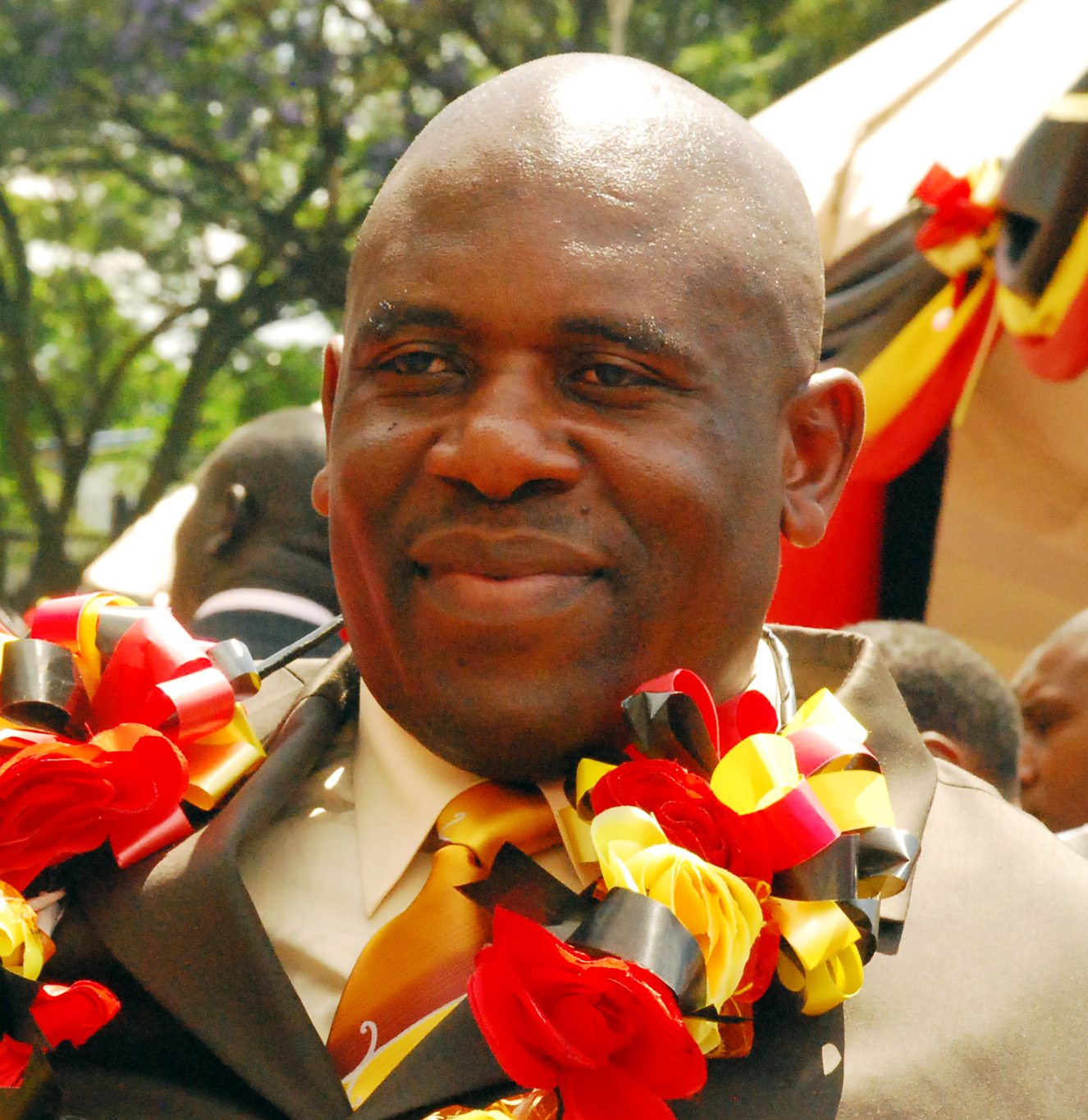

State Minister of Works
- Incumbent
- Assumed office 1 March 2015
- Preceded by: John Byabagambi

State Minister of Foreign Affairs for Regional Affairs
- In office 27 May 2011 – 1 March 2015
- Preceded by: Isaac Musumba

State Minister for Lands
- In office 2009–2011

Member of Parliament for Bugabula County South
- Incumbent
- Assumed office 2006
- Preceded by: Salaamu Musumba

Personal details
- Born: 27 December 1963 (age 62) Kamuli District, Uganda
- Citizenship: Uganda
- Party: National Resistance Movement
- Education: Makerere University (LLB, LLM); Law Development Centre (Diploma in Legal Practice)
- Profession: Lawyer

Asuman Kiyingi is a Ugandan lawyer and politician. He was the State Minister of Works in Uganda's Cabinet. He was appointed to that position on 1 March 2015, replacing John Byabagambi, who was appointed Minister of Works and Transport. Prior to that, from 27 May 2011 until 1 March 2015, he was the State Minister of Foreign Affairs for Regional Affairs. He was appointed to that position on 27 May 2011. He replaced Isaac Musumba, who was dropped from the cabinet. Before that, he served as the State Minister for Lands from 2009 until 2011. He also represents Bugabula County South, Kamuli District, in the Parliament of Uganda. He has served in that position since 23 February 2006.

== Background and education ==
He was born in Kamuli District on 27 December 1963. While attending Makerere University, Uganda's oldest university, founded in 1922, he earned both a Bachelor of Laws and a Master of Laws. He also holds the Diploma in Legal Practice from the Law Development Center in Kampala.

== Work experience ==
Before his appointment to the cabinet in February 2009, Kiyingi worked in several diverse legal settings. He started as a legal assistant in the Kampala-based legal firm of Ntume, Nyanzi & Company Advocates. Later, he moved to another Kampala legal company called Mugenyi & Company Advocates. He was promoted to the rank of advocate while there. From that job, he became a legal officer with the National Social Security Fund. From there, he became the Corporation Secretary at National Medical Stores, which is Uganda's pharmaceutical acquisition body. The last job he worked before joining politics was as legal counsel to the National Planning Authority. He was elected to the Ugandan Parliament in February 2006, upsetting the then incumbent MP, Salaamu Musumba of the Forum for Democratic Change, opposition political party.

== Personal details ==
Asuman Kiyingi is married. He is affiliated to the National Resistance Movement political party. He is reported to enjoy debating, travel, theater and poetry.

== See also ==
- Cabinet of Uganda
- Government of Uganda
- Parliament of Uganda
