= Bukungu =

Settlement in Uganda

- Nickname: Bukungu
- Map of Uganda showing the location of Bukungu.
- Coordinates: 01°26′10″N 32°52′07″E
- Country: Uganda
- Region: Eastern Region
- District: Buyende District
- County: Budiope County
- Sub-county: Kidera Sub-county
- Elevation: 1,040 m (3,410 ft)

Population (2013 Estimate)
  - Total: 19,033
- Time zone: UTC+3 (EAT)

Bukungu is a town in the Buyende District of the Eastern Region of Uganda.

== Location ==
Bukungu is in extreme northern Buyende District, at the northern end of the Kamuli-Bukungu Road. This is approximately 77 kilometres (48 mi), by road, northwest of Kamuli, the nearest large town. This is about 51 kilometres (32 mi), by road, northwest of Buyende, where the district headquarters are located.

Bukungu is located approximately 139 kilometres (86 mi) northwest of Jinja, the largest city in Uganda's Eastern Region. The coordinates of the town are:01°26'10.0"N, 32°52'07.0"E (Latitude:01°26'10.0"N; Longitude:32°52'07.0"E).

== Overview ==
Bukungu is the location of the headquarters of Bukungu Parish, one of the parishes in Kidera Sub-county, a constituent of Buyende District. Bukungu is close to the point where the Victoria Nile enters Lake Kyoga, to the west of town. The town sits on a peninsula that projects into Lake Kyoga. The town and surrounding villages constitutes a very low income community, where sanitation and sourcing clean, drinking water is a challenge.

== See also ==
- List of cities and towns in Uganda
