= Nansana =

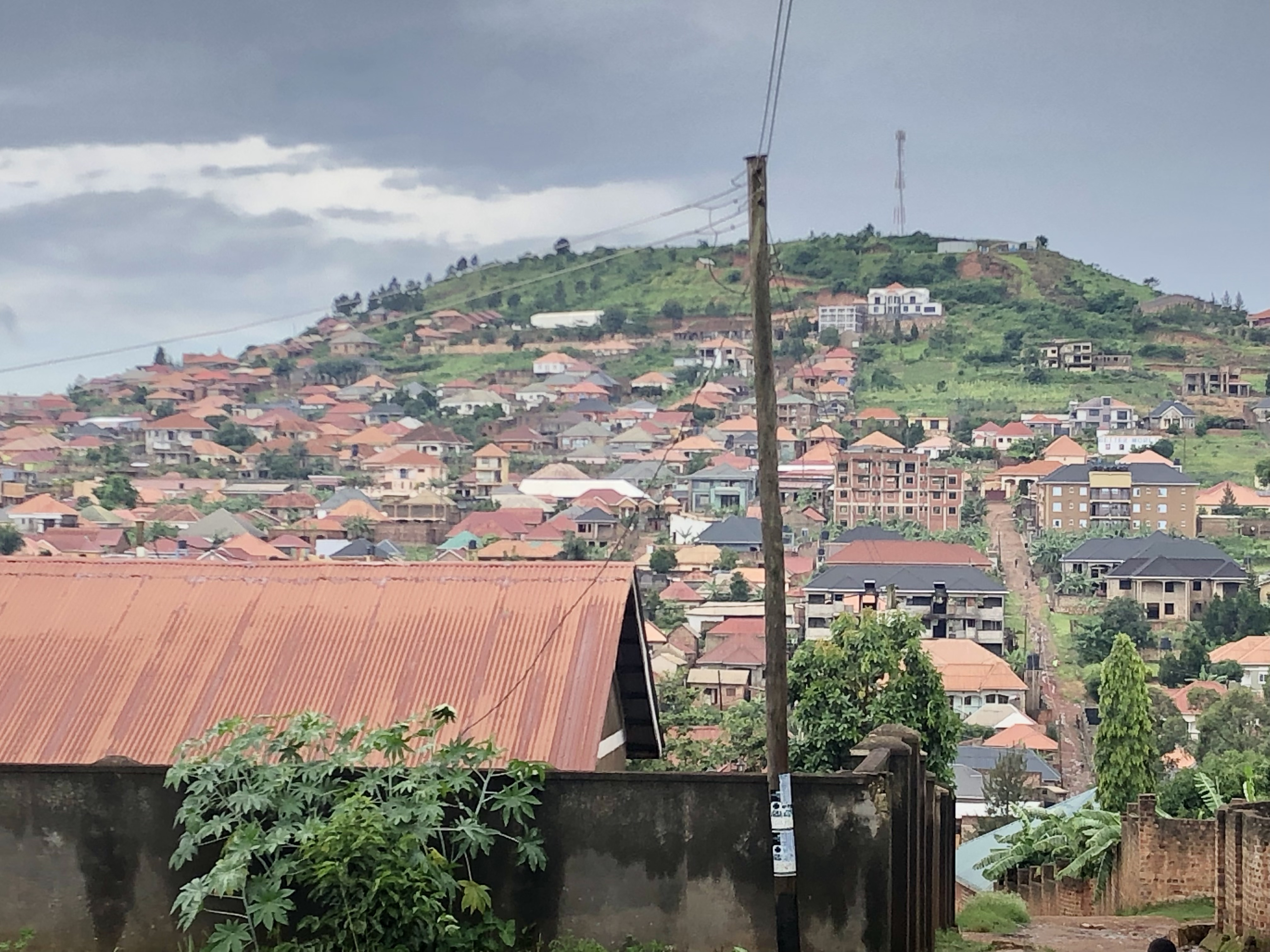
- Nansana

- Map of the Kampala region showing the location of Nansana.
- Coordinates: 00°21′50″N 32°31′43″E
- Country: Uganda
- Region: Central Region
- District: Wakiso District

Government
  - Mayor: Regina Bakitte
- Elevation: 1,191 m (3,907 ft)

Population (2020)
  - Total: 532,800
- Time zone: UTC+3 (EAT)
- Website: www.nansana.go.ug

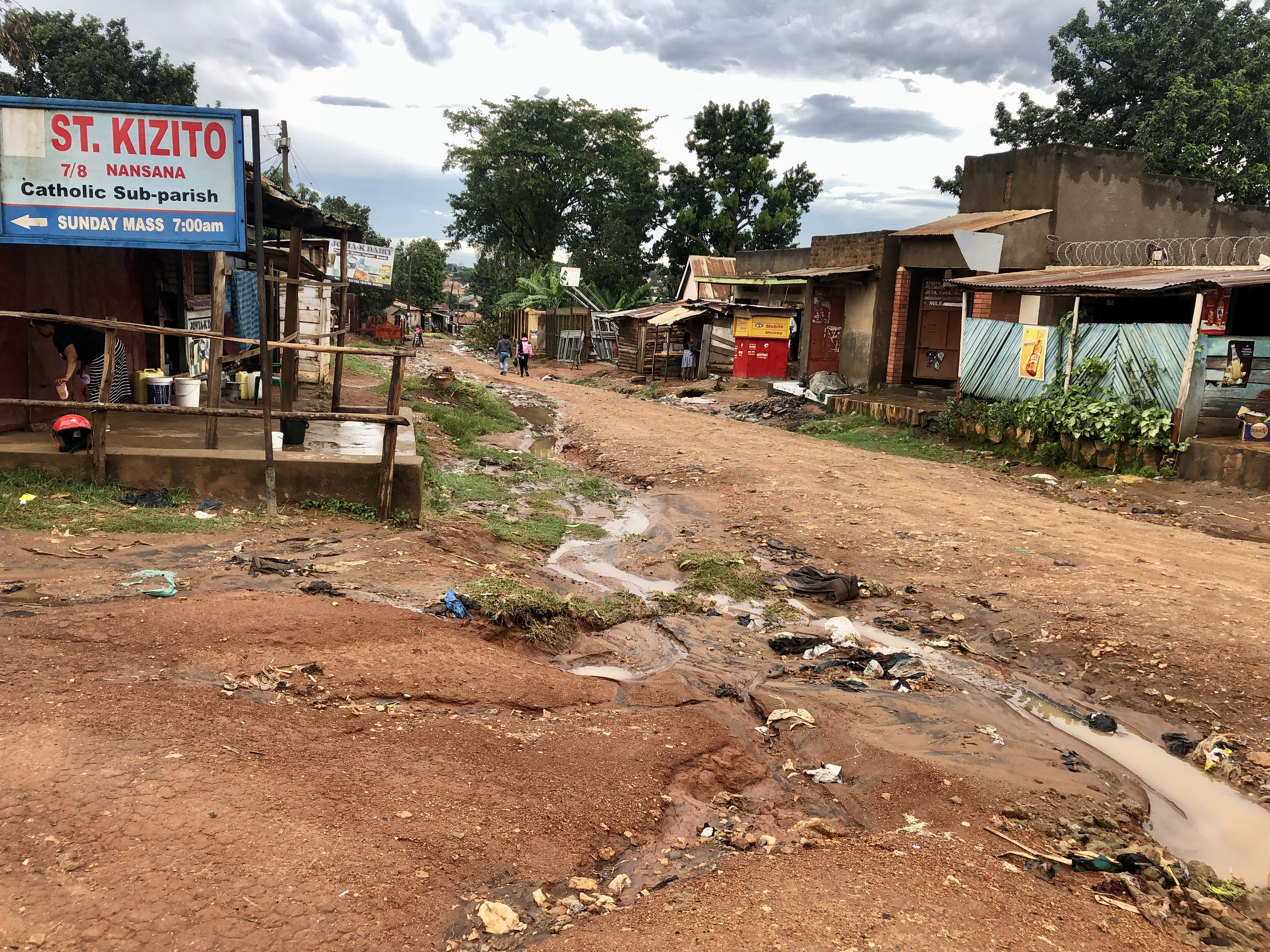
Drainage in Nansana Yesu Amala - Wakiso, Uganda

Nansana is a town in the Central Region of Uganda. It is located in Wakiso District and is one of the five municipalities in the district. Nansana is a municipal council comprising four Divisions; Nansana Division, Nabweru Division, Gombe Division, and Busukuma Divisions. The four Divisions are considered as lower local government independent units.

== Location ==
Nansana is located on the main highway between Kampala and Hoima, the Kampala-Hoima Road. The town is located approximately 12 kilometres (7 mi), by road, north-west of Kampala, Uganda's capital and largest city. This is approximately 8 kilometres (5 mi), by road, south of Wakiso, the location of the district headquarters. The coordinates of the town are 0°21'50.0"N, 32°31'43.0"E (Latitude:0.363889; Longitude:32.528611). Nansana sits at an average elevation of 1,191 metres (3,907 ft), above mean sea level.

== Population ==
In 2002, the national population census put Nansana's population at 62,044. In 2010, the Uganda Bureau of Statistics (UBOS) estimated the town's population at 86,200. In 2011, UBOS estimated the mid-year population at 89,900. In 2014, the national population census put the population at 365,124.

In 2020, the mid-year population of Nansana was projected at 532,800. It is calculated that the population of the municipality grew at an average annual rate of 6.68 percent, between 2014 and 2020.

Historical population
Year	Pop.	±%
2002	62,044	—
2010	86,200	+38.9%
2011	89,900	+4.3%
2014	365,134	+306.2%
2020	532,800	+45.9%

== Overview ==
Nansana is a high-density working-class neighborhood. Beginning in May 2017 a crime wave engulfed the town, involving the murder of young women in their 20s and 30s. As of 4 August 2017, a total of 10 young women have been murdered in Nansana, after being sexually molested. None of the murders have been solved. The local politicians have disagreed on what needs to be done. There are reasons to believe that some of the victims were engaged in prostitution and were killed when they disagreed with their customers. Ian Kyeyune, the Resident District Commissioner (RDC) for Wakiso District proposes to license all prostitutes in the town so that they are accorded protection by the government. However, Regina Bakitte, the mayor of Nansana, opposes the idea, arguing that this would encourage promiscuity in the town. Prostitution is illegal in Uganda.

== See also ==
- List of cities and towns in Uganda
