= Miria Matembe =

Ugandan lawyer and politician (born 1953)

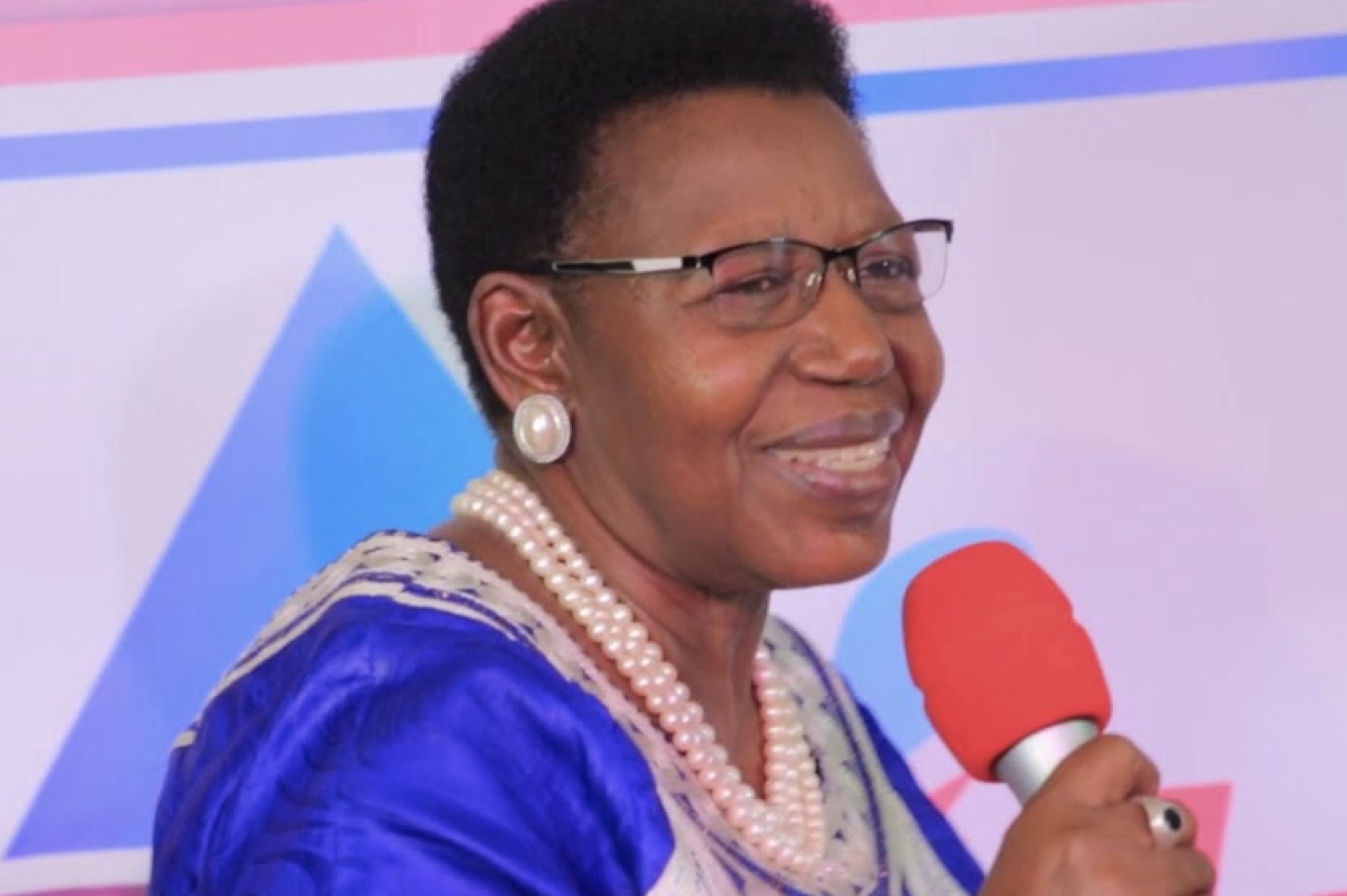

Member of the Pan-African Parliament for Uganda
- In office 2003–Unknown

Personal details
- Born: August 28, 1953 (age 73) Mbarara, Uganda
- Education: Makerere University; University of Warwick
- Occupation: Lawyer, politician

Miria Rukoza Koburunga Matembe (born 26 August 1953) is a Ugandan lawyer, politician, gender equality advocate and a senior citizen.

In June 2006, she became a Reagan-Fascell Democracy Fellow with the National Endowment for Democracy.

== Early life and education ==
Matembe was born on 28 August 1953 in Bwizibwera, Kashaari, Mbarara to Samwiri Rukoza and Eseza Kajwengye. She is the fourth-born of nine children (five boys and four girls). She attended Rutooma Primary School, after which she proceeded to Bweranyangi Girls’ Senior Secondary School for her O-Level studies. She continued to Namasagali College for her A-Level studies.

Matembe obtained a Bachelor of Laws (LLB) degree from Makerere University and, later, a Master of Laws (LLM) degree from the University of Warwick.

== Career ==
Matembe began her career as a State Attorney in the Department of Public Prosecutions at the Ministry of Justice. She then worked as a Lecturer in Law at the Uganda College of Commerce from 1979 to 1983.

Later, she worked as a Senior Lecturer in Law at the Chartered Institute of Bankers from 1983 to 1989 before joining politics.

From 1989 to 1994, she served as a Member of the National Resistance Council, representing Mbarara District.

She then served as a Constituent Assembly Delegate from 1994-1995.

In 1996, she was elected Woman Member of Parliament for Mbarara District, a seat she held until 2006. She withdrew from elective politics in 2006 after a fallout with Yoweri Museveni, the president of Uganda in 2003 after the removal of presidential term limits from the Constitution.

She also served as Uganda’s first Minister of Ethics and Integrity from 1998 to 2003.

Since retiring from elective politics in 2006, she has continued to be an outspoken advocate for gender equality and women’s empowerment.

== Women's Rights Advocacy ==
Matembe has been a strong proponent and advocate of women's rights in Uganda for more than three decades and has authored several articles and books to that effect.

In October 2006, she gave a lecture entitled, "Women, War, Peace: Politics in Peacebuilding" at the University of San Diego's Joan B. Kroc Institute for Peace & Justice Distinguished Lecture Series.

She is a co-founder of Action for Development (ACFODE), one of the Uganda's most influential women's rights organization.

== Books ==
- The Struggle for Freedom and Democracy Betrayed.
- Woman in the Eyes of God: Reclaiming a Lost Identity.
- Miria Matembe: Gender Politics and Constitution Making in Uganda

== Awards ==
- Honorary Doctor of Laws (LL.D) from University of Victoria, 2007
- Cheveners Lifetime Achiever Award (2022).

== Personal life ==
She married Nekemia Matembe in July 1975. They have four children and 13 grandchildren. In 2023, they celebrated their 48th wedding anniversary.
