= Masulita =

Masulita Kiziba
- Location in Uganda
- Coordinates: 00°30′44″N 32°21′59″E
- Country: Uganda
- Region: Central Region
- County: Busiro
- Constituency: Busiro North

Government
  - MP: Paul Nsubuga

Area
- 21.7 sq mi (56.3 km^{2})
- Elevation: 3,734 ft (1,138 m)

Population (2020 Estimate)
  - Total: 21,300
  - Density: 980/sq mi (378.3/km^{2})

Masulita is a town in Wakiso District in the Central Region of Uganda. As of April 2021 Masulita is one of four town councils in the district.

== Location ==
Masulita is approximately 12.5 kilometres (7.8 mi) north of Kakiri, the nearest large town. This is approximately 22 kilometres (14 mi), northwest of Wakiso, where the district headquarters are located.

Masulita is located approximately 38 kilometres (24 mi), by road, northwest of Kampala, Uganda's capital and largest city. The geographical coordinates of the town are 0°30'44.0"N, 32°21'59.0"E (Latitude:0.5122; Longitude:32.3664).

== Population ==
The 2002 national census enumerated the population of the town at 11,564. The national census of 27 August 2014 enumerated the population at 14,762.

In 2015, the Uganda Bureau of Statistics (UBOS) estimated the population of Masulita at 15,400. In 2020, the population agency estimated the mid-year population of the town at 21,300. Of these, 10,700 (50.2 percent) were male and 10,600 (49.8 percent) were female. UBOS calculated the average annual growth rate of the town's population at 6.7 percent, between 2015 and 2020.

Historical population
Year	Pop.	±%
2002	11,564	—
2014	14,762	+27.7%
2015	15,400	+4.3%
2020	21,300	+38.3%

== Points of interest ==
The town is home to a number of Christian churches. It also hosts several primary schools. Masulita Secondary School is located in the middle of town. Masulita Central Market is situated at the south-eastern corner of the major road intersection in the center of the town.

== See also ==
- List of cities and towns in Uganda
