= List of cities and towns in Uganda =

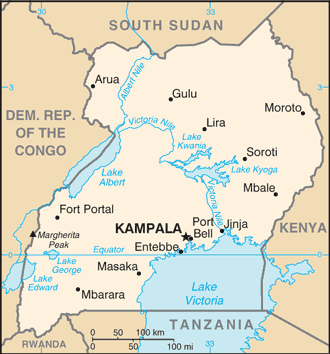
Map of Uganda

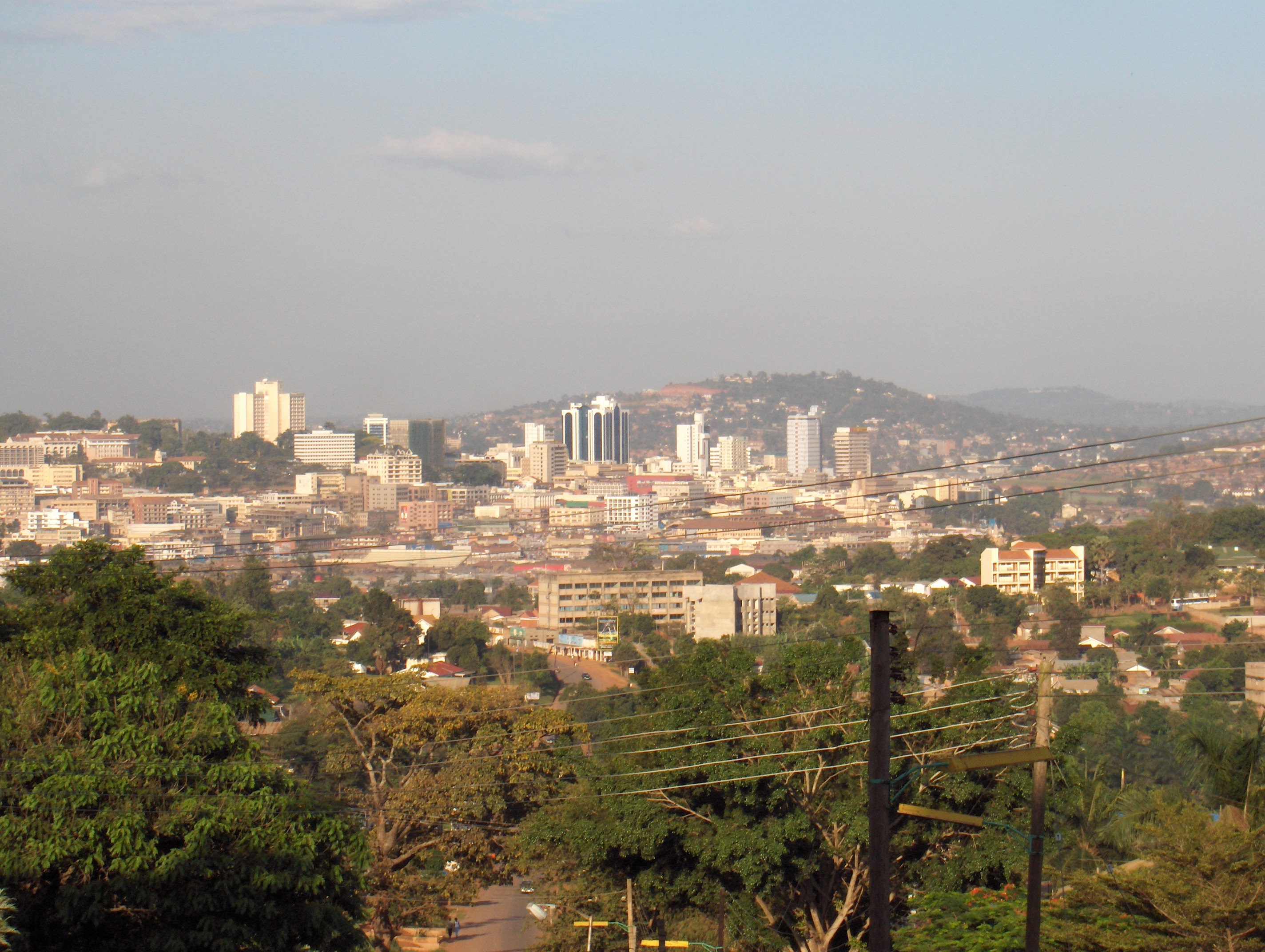
Kampala, Capital of Uganda

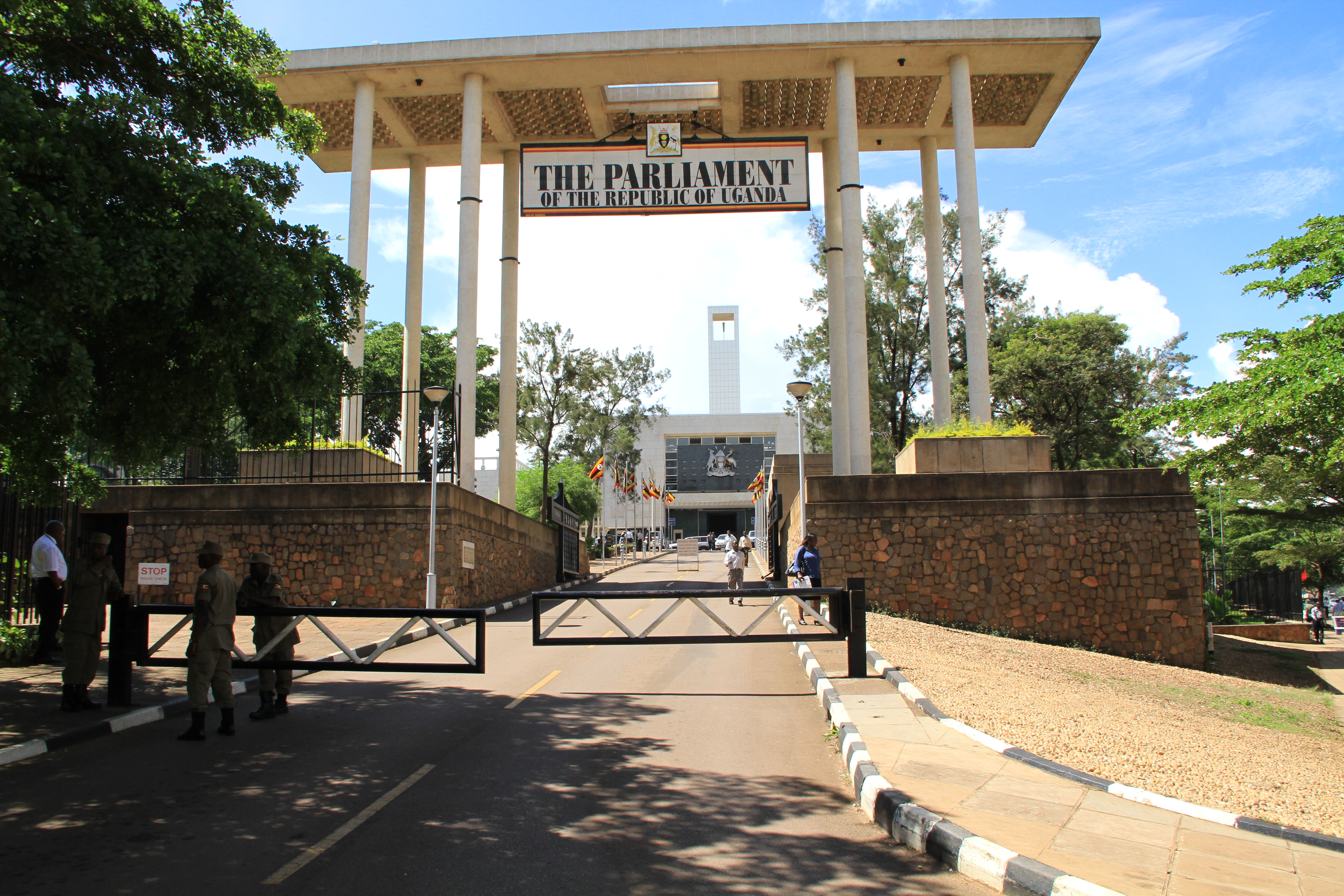
Parliament of Uganda, Kampala

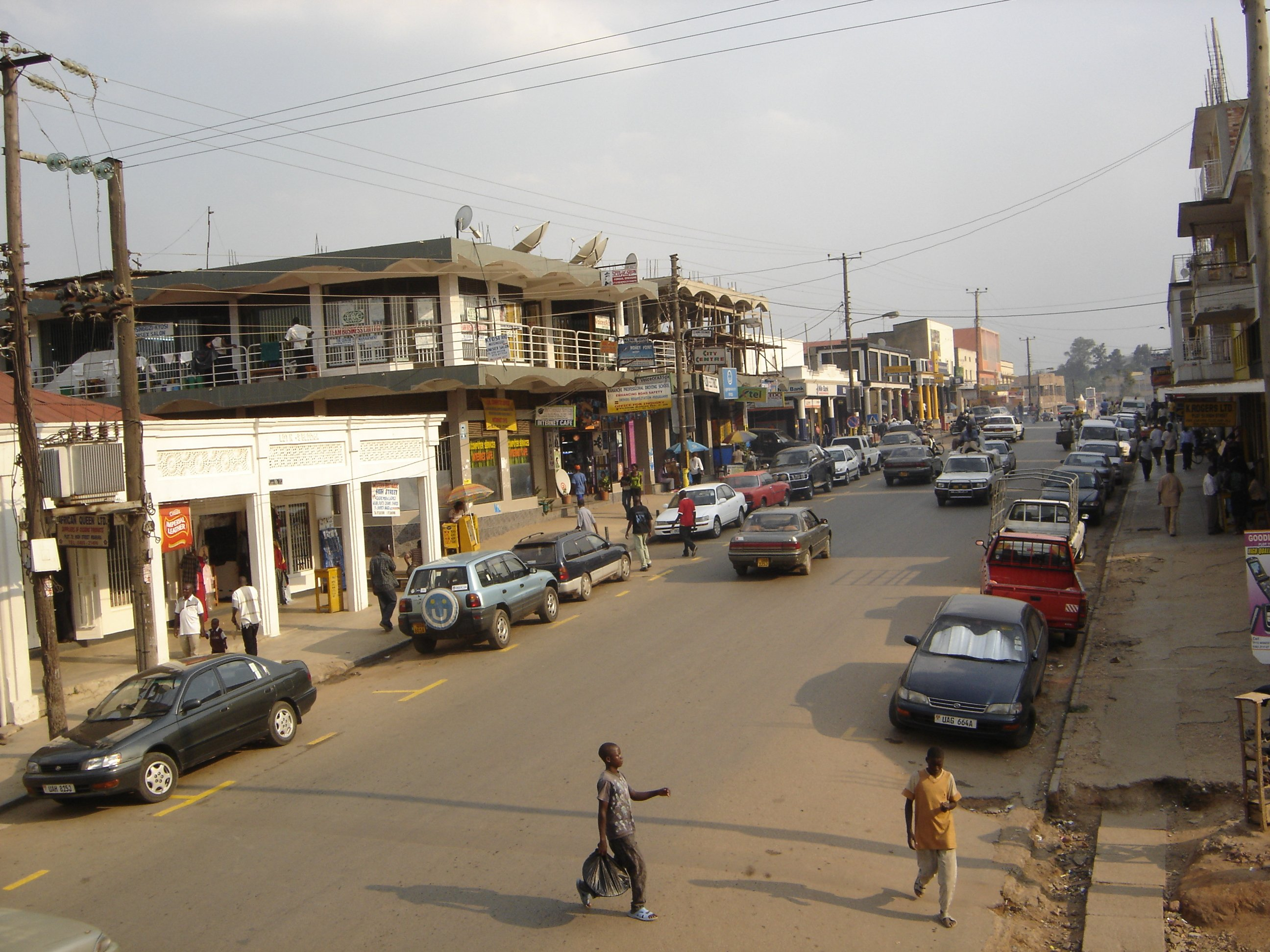
Mbarara

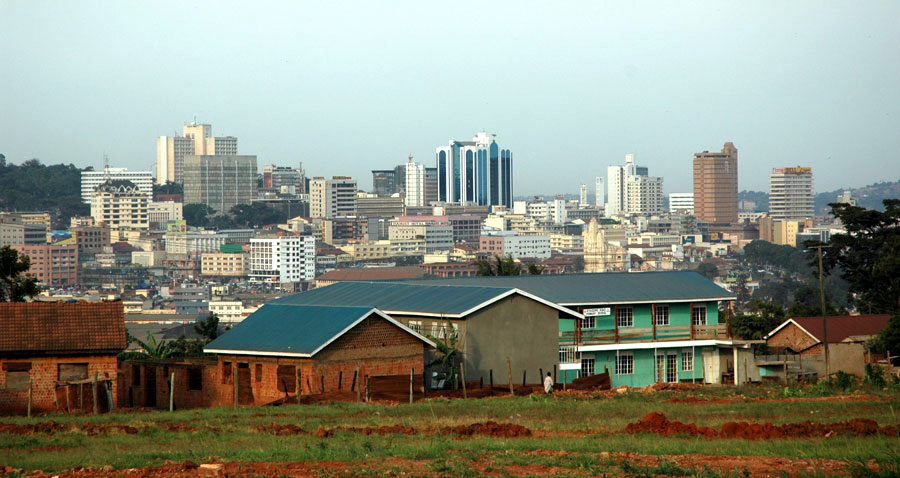
Kampala, Capital of Uganda

This is a list of cities and towns in Uganda: The population data are for 2014, except where otherwise indicated. The references from which the estimated populations are sourced are listed in each article for the cities and towns where the population estimates are given.

== Twenty largest cities by population ==
The following population numbers are from the August 2014 national census, as documented in the final report of November 2016, by the Uganda Bureau of Statistics (UBOS).

Rank	Name	2014 Census	Coordinates
1	Kampala	1,507,082	0°18′49″N 32°34′52″E
2	Nansana	365,124	0°21′50″N 32°31′43″E
3	Kira	317,157	0°23′50″N 32°38′20″E
4	Ssabagabo	283,272	0°14′34″N 32°33′36″E
5	Mbarara	195,531	0°36′48″S 30°39′30″E
6	Mukono	162,710	0°21′36″N 32°45′00″E
7	Njeru	159,549	0°25′52″N 33°08′52″E
8	Gulu	150,306	2°46′54″N 32°17′57″E
9	Lugazi	114,524	0°22′08″N 32°56′25″E
10	Masaka	103,227	0°20′28″S 31°44′10″E
11	Kasese	101,065	0°11′12″N 30°05′17″E
12	Hoima	100,099	1°25′55″N 31°21′09″E
13	Lira	99,392	2°14′50″N 32°54′00″E
14	Mityana	95,428	0°24′02″N 32°02′32″E
15	Mubende	103,473	0°33′27″N 31°23′42″E
16	Masindi	94,438	1°41′01″N 31°43′20″E
17	Mbale	92,857	1°04′50″N 34°10′30″E
18	Jinja	76,188	0°25′24″N 33°12′24″E
19	Entebbe	70,219	0°03′00″N 32°27′36″E
20	Kitgum	44,719	3°17′20″N 32°52′40″E

== Cities ==
In May 2019, the Cabinet of Uganda approved the creation of 15 cities, in a phased manner, over the course of the next one to three years, as illustrated in the table below. The 7 of the 15 cities started operations on 1 July 2020 as approved by the Parliament of Uganda.

== Municipalities ==
1. Abim - 17,400
2. Adjumani - 43,022
3. Alebtong - 15,100
4. Amolatar - 14,800
5. Amuria - 5,400
6. Amuru
7. Apac - 14,503
8. Arua - 62,657
9. Bombo - 26,370
10. Budaka - 23,834
11. Bugembe - 41,323
12. Bugiri - 29,013
13. Buikwe - 16,633
14. Bukedea - 13,900
15. Bukomansimbi - 9,900 (2012)
16. Bukungu - 19,033 (2013)
17. Buliisa - 28,100
18. Bundibugyo - 21,600
19. Busembatya - 15,700
20. Bushenyi - 41,063
21. Busia - 55,958
22. Busolwe - 16.730
23. Butaleja - 19,519
24. Buwenge - 22,074
25. Buyende - 23,039
26. Dokolo - 19,810
27. Elegu - 5,000 (2012)
28. Entebbe - 69,958
29. Fort Portal - 54,275
30. Gombe, Butambala - 15,196
31. Gulu - 152,276
32. Hima - 29,700
33. Hoima - 100,625
34. Ibanda - 31,316
35. Iganga - 53,870
36. Isingiro - 29,721
37. Jinja - 72,931
38. Kaabong - 23,900
39. Kabale - 49,667
40. Kaberamaido - 3,400
41. Kabuyanda - 16,325
42. Kabwohe - 20,300
43. Kagadi - 22,813
44. Kakinga - 22,151
45. Kakira - 32,819
46. Kakiri - 19,449
47. Kalangala - 5,200
48. Kaliro - 16,796
49. Kalisizo - 32,700
50. Kalongo - 15,000
51. Kalungu
52. Kampala - 1,659,600
53. Kamuli - 17,725
54. Kamwenge - 19,240
55. Kanoni
56. Kanungu - 15,138
57. Kapchorwa - 12,900
58. Kasese - 101,679
59. Katakwi - 8,400
60. Kayunga - 26,588
61. Kibaale - 7,600
62. Kibingo - 15,918
63. Kiboga - 19,591
64. Kihiihi - 20,349
65. Kira - 313,761
66. Kiruhura - 14,300 (2012)
67. Kiryandongo - 31,610
68. Kisoro - 17,561
69. Kitgum - 44,604
70. Koboko - 37,825
71. Kotido - 22,900
72. Kumi - 36,493
73. Kyazanga - 15,531
74. Kyegegwa - 18,729
75. Kyenjojo - 23,467
76. Kyotera - 9,000
77. Lira - 99,059
78. Lugazi - 39,483
79. Lukaya - 24,250
80. Luweero - 42,734
81. Lwakhakha - 10,700
82. Lwengo - 15,527
83. Lyantonde - 8,900
84. Malaba - 18,228
85. Manafwa - 15,800
86. Masaka - 103,829
87. Masindi - 94,622
88. Masindi Port - 10,400 (2009)
89. Masulita - 14,762
90. Matugga - 15,000 (2010)
91. Mayuge - 17,151
92. Mbale - 92,863
93. Mbarara - 195,013
94. Mitooma
95. Mityana - 48,002
96. Moroto - 14,818
97. Moyo - 23,700
98. Mpigi - 44,274
99. Mpondwe - 51,018
100. Mubende - 46,921
101. Mukono - 161,996
102. Mutukula - 15,000 (2009)
103. Nagongera - 11,800
104. Nakaseke - 8,600
105. Nakapiripirit - 2,800
106. Nakasongola - 7,800
107. Namayingo - 15,741
108. Namayumba - 15,205
109. Namutumba - 18,736
110. Nansana - 144,441
111. Nebbi - 34,975
112. Ngora - 15,086
113. Njeru - 159,549
114. Nkokonjeru - 14,000
115. Ntungamo - 18,854
116. Oyam - 14,500
117. Pader - 14,080
118. Paidha - 33,426
119. Pakwach - 22,360
120. Pallisa - 32,681
121. Rakai - 7,000
122. Rukungiri - 36,509
123. Rwimi - 16,256
124. Sanga - 5,200 (2012)
125. Sembabule - 4,800
126. Sironko - 18,884
127. Soroti - 49,452
128. Ssabagabo - 282,664
129. Tororo - 41,906
130. Wakiso - 60,911
131. Wobulenzi - 27,027
132. Yumbe - 35,606
