= Busunju =

- Location in Uganda
- Coordinates: 00°33′56″N 32°12′13″E
- Country: Uganda
- Region: Central Region
- District: Mityana District
- County: Ssingo
- Constituency: Mityana East
- Elevation: 3,870 ft (1,180 m)

Busunju is a town in the Mityana District in the Central Region of Uganda.

== Location ==
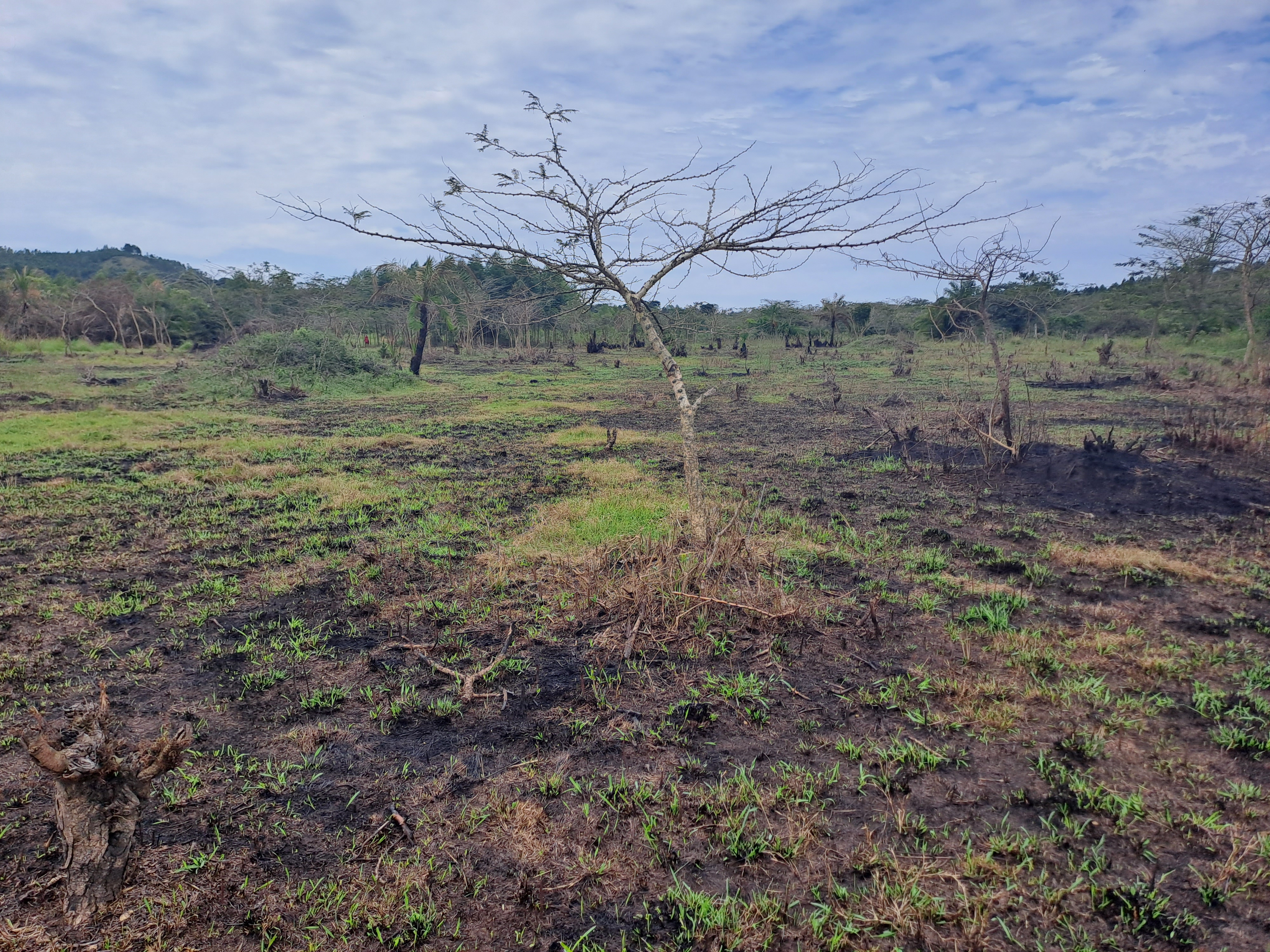
Vegetation regrowth in Busunju Mityana

Busunju lies along the Kampala–Hoima Road, and is the northern end of the Kampala–Busunju Expressway. It is approximately 59 kilometres (37 mi), by road, northwest of Kampala, Uganda's capital and largest city. The coordinates of the town are 0°33'56.0"N, 32°12'13.0"E (Latitude:0.565568; Longitude:32.203603).farouk+e

== See also ==
- List of cities and towns in Uganda
