= Salaamu Musumba =

Ugandan politician, policy analyst, and former journalist

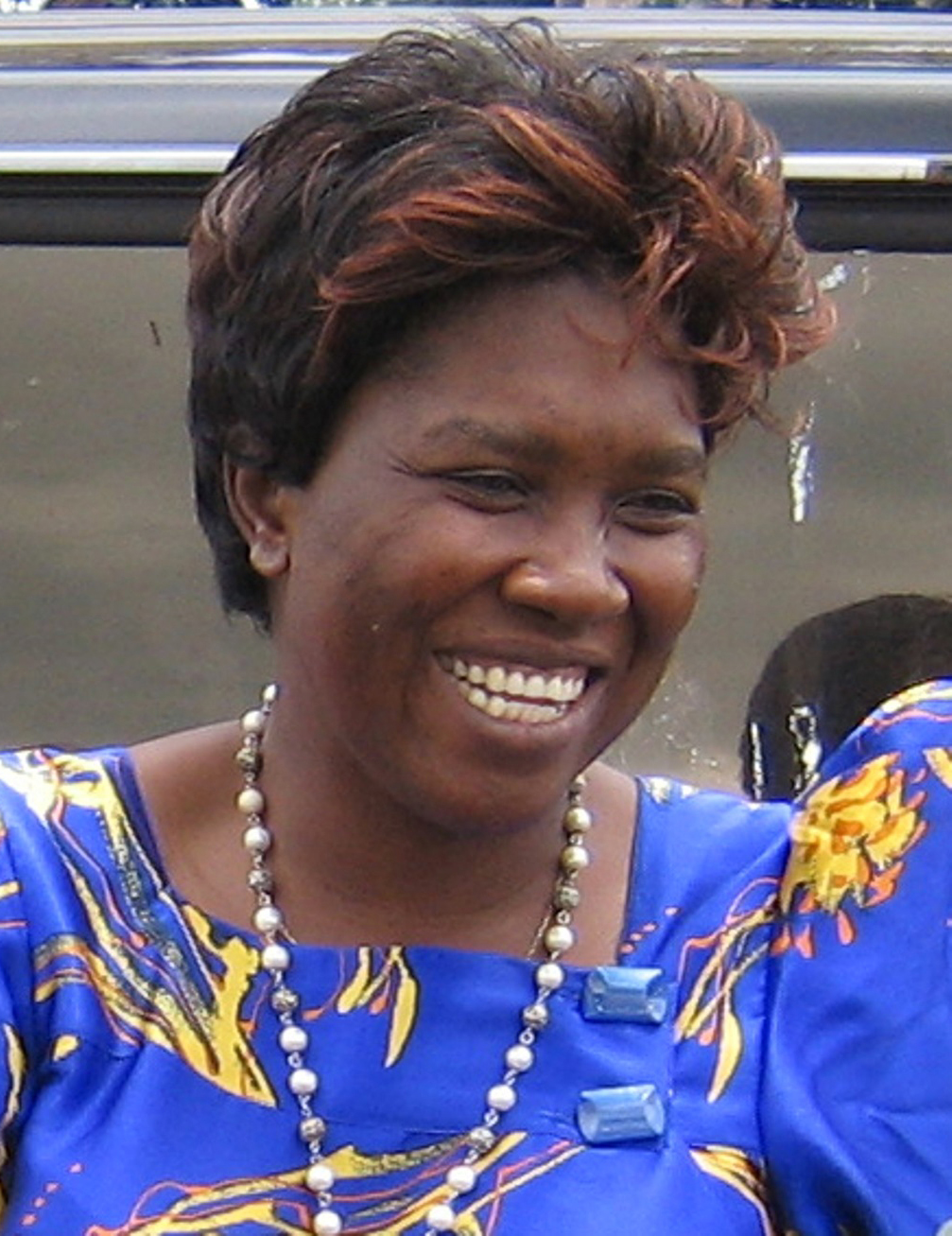

Chairperson (LCV), Kamuli District
- In office 2012–2016

Vice President (Eastern Region), Forum for Democratic Change
- In office 2006–2024

Personal details
- Born: March 11, 1963 (age 63) Namwendwa, Kamuli District, Uganda
- Citizenship: Ugandan
- Party: People's Front for Freedom (PFF)
- Other political affiliations: Forum for Democratic Change (FDC)
- Spouse: Isaac Isanga Musumba
- Education: Mount Saint Mary's College Namagunga; Makerere University; University of Nottingham
- Occupation: Politician, policy analyst, former journalist
- Known for: Opposition politics, women's rights advocacy
- Nickname: Iron Lady

Salaamu Musumba also known as Night Salam Musumba or Salam Musumba Proscovia or "iron lady" (born on 11 March 1963) is a Uganda politician, policy analyst and former journalist known for her role in opposition politics and women's rights advocacy in Uganda. She served as the Chairperson (LCV) of Kamuli District under Forum for Democratic Change (FDC) card to which she was the vice president for eastern region but later joined People's Front for Freedom (PFF).

== Early life and education ==
Salaamu was born in Namwendwa, a village in Kamuli District. She started her education from Kidiki Mixed Primary School before joining Mount Saint Mary's College Namagunga for her secondary education. She attained her a Bachelor of Social Work and Social Administration (SWASA) from Makerere University and Master of Art in Social Policy and Administration from Nottingham University.

== Political career ==
Salaamu served as the Chairperson (LCV) of Kamuli District from 2012 to 2016 after winning an election against several candidates. During her tenure, she focused on reconciliation in a politically divided district, promoting multiparty cooperation and improving service delivery. She also emphasized tackling poverty, corruption, and strengthening local governance structures.

After her time in the Forum for Democratic Change (FDC), Salaamu became associated with the People's Front for Freedom (PFF), under which she has contested for parliamentary positions, including the Bugabula South constituency.

== Personal life ==
Musumba was married to Isaac Isanga Musumba, a former minister and Member of Parliament in the Parliament of Uganda for Buzaaya County in Kamuli District.

== See also ==
- Isaac Isanga Musumba
- Kizza Besigye
- Norbert Mao
- Winnie Kiiza
- Nathan Nandala Mafabi
- Politics of Uganda
- Forum for Democratic Change
