= Jinja Hospital =

Public hospital in Uganda

Jinja Regional Referral Hospital
- Uganda Ministry of Health

Geography
- Location: Jinja, Jinja District, Uganda
- Coordinates: 00°25′52″N 33°12′18″E

Organisation
- Care system: Public
- Type: General and Teaching

Services
- Emergency department: I
- Beds: 600

Links
- Other links: Hospitals in Uganda; Medical education in Uganda

Jinja Regional Referral Hospital, commonly known as Jinja Hospital, is a hospital in the city of Jinja, in the Eastern Region of Uganda. This 600-bed medical facility is the largest hospital in eastern Uganda, although many more patients are admitted beyond its sanctioned capacity, with many having to sleep on the floor.

== Location ==
The hospital is located in the center of Jinja, not far from the source of the Nile. It is the Regional Referral Hospital for the districts of Bugiri, Iganga, Jinja, Kaliro, Kamuli, Luuka, Mayuge, Namayingo, Kayunga and parts of Buikwe. The hospital is located approximately 84 kilometres (52 mi) east of Mulago National Referral Hospital. The coordinates of Jinja Regional Referral Hospital are: 00°25'52.0"N, 33°12'18.0"E (Latitude:0.431111; Longitude:33.205000).

== Overview ==
Jinja Hospital is one of the thirteen (13) Regional Referral Hospitals in Uganda. It is also one of the fifteen (15) hospitals designated as Internship Hospitals, where graduates of Ugandan medical schools may undergo a year of internship under the supervision of consultants and specialists in the designated medical and surgical disciplines. The hospital is currently undergoing major renovations as a result of available funds from the government for capital development.

== Intensive Care Unit ==
In July 2009, a new 20-bed intensive care unit (ICU) was commissioned. Construction funds were donated by: 1. The Rotary Club of Jinja in District 9200 2. The Rotary Club of Eugene, Oregon, United States in District 5110 3. The Government of Uganda through the Ministry of Finance Planning and Economic Development.

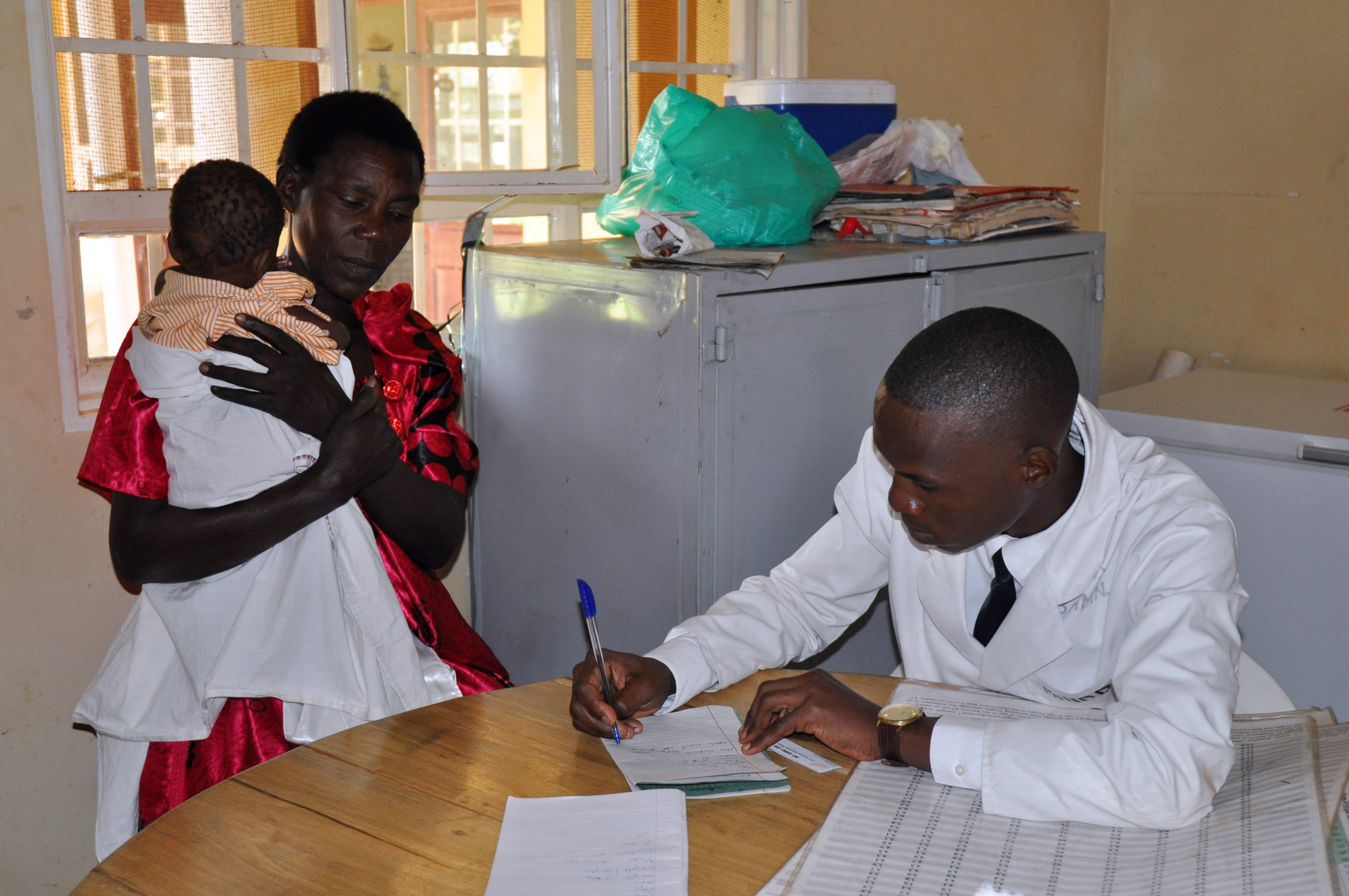
Uganda Nutrition at Jinja Hospital

The life-sustaining equipment in the ICU were donated by: 1. Assist International, a California, United States–based NGO and 2. General Electric, an American conglomerate that manufactures high-tech medical equipment among other precision instruments. In 2022, the ICU was expanded and renovated by the Engineering Brigade of Uganda People's Defense Forces (UPDF).

== Orthopedic Ward ==
In October 2024, Jinja Regional Referral Hospital inaugurated a new 64-bed capacity Orthopedic Ward, financed by the UK-based Samuel Leeds Foundation. The foundation’s founder, Samuel Leeds, had suffered serious injuries in a water-rafting accident in Uganda in July 2019 and was treated at Jinja Hospital; inspired by his experience as a patient and by observing others in need during his stay, he provided the funding for the construction of the ward. Groundbreaking for the ward took place on 6 October 2023, following a Memorandum of Understanding signed on 28 August 2023 between Samuel Leeds Foundation and the Ministry of Health.

== Dialysis Services ==
Currently there are no dialysis treatment options available at Jinja Hospital, patients have to travel to Kiruddu Hospital in Kampala. Jinja Hospital's director, Dr. Alfred Yayi, has requested funds for establishing dialysis services during the 2025/26 Budget Hearing in front of the Parliament's Health Committee.

== See also ==
- Hospitals in Uganda
