= Dennis Galabuzi Ssozi =

Ugandan civil engineer and politician (born 1975)

- Born: 1975 (age 50–51); Masulita, Uganda
- Citizenship: Uganda
- Occupations: Civil engineer, politician, businessman
- Years active: 2001–present
- Known for: Politics
- Title: State Minister for Luweero Triangle/National Coordinator, Parish Development Model

Dennis Galabuzi Ssozi also Dennis Galabuzi Ssozi, is a Ugandan civil engineer, politician and businessman. He is the State Minister for Luweero Triangle in the Ugandan Cabinet. He was appointed to that position on 6 June 2016, replacing Sarah Kataike, who was dropped from cabinet. Galabuzi Ssozi also served as the elected member of parliament, representing Busiro North Constituency, in Wakiso District, in the 10th Parliament of Uganda (2016–2021). He is currently the National Coordinator, Parish Development Model

== Early life and education ==
Ssozi was born in Masulita, Busiro county, Wakiso District, in the Central Region of Uganda, in 1974. He is a qualified civil engineer with a Bachelor of Science in Civil Engineering and a Master of Science in Civil Engineering.

== Career ==
On 6 June 2016, he was appointed State Minister for Luweero Triangle. Prior to that he worked in the Ugandan Water Ministry, before going into private business. At the time of his appointment, in addition to his parliamentary duties, he served as the Vice President of the Uganda Olympic Committee.

== See also ==
- Cabinet of Uganda
- Parliament of Uganda
