= Kampala–Hoima Road =

Road in Uganda

Coordinates: 00°55′29″N 31°45′26″E

Route information
- Length: 126 mi (203 km)

Major junctions
- South end: Kampala
- Naakulabye; Nansana; Wakiso; Kakiri; Busunju; Bukomero; Kiboga
- North end: Hoima

Location
- Country: Uganda

Highway system
- Roads in Uganda

The Kampala–Hoima Road is a road in the Central and Western regions of Uganda, connecting the cities of Kampala and Hoima. A section of this road, between Namungoona and Busunju, is being developed into the Kampala–Busunju Expressway.

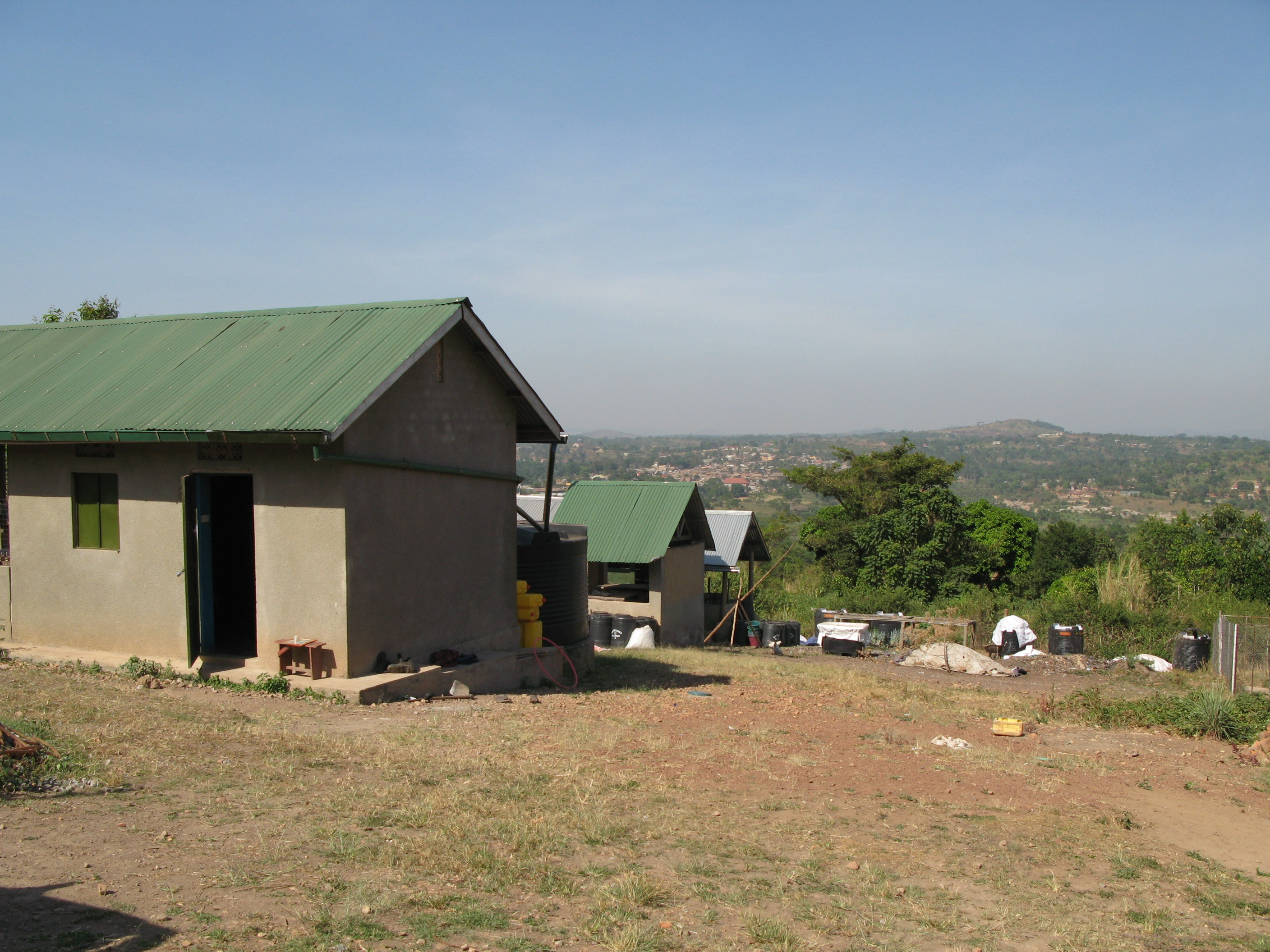
Kakiri research site

== Location ==
The road begins in Kampala, Uganda's capital and largest city, running in a northwestern direction through six districts to end in Hoima, the headquarters of the country's nascent petrochemical industry, a distance of approximately 202 kilometres (126 mi).

== Overview ==
The highway is an all-weather tarmac single carriageway road. It offers the most direct route from Kampala to the oil-rich Albertine region in the Western Region.

== Upgrade to tarmac ==
Before 2006, the road was gravel surfaced. The government of Uganda contracted for the road to be upgraded to class II bitumen surface with shoulders, drainage channels, and culverts. The upgrade lasted until 2009.

== See also ==
- List of roads in Uganda
