= Bweranyangi Girls' Senior Secondary School =

Coordinates: 00°33′35″S 30°12′30″E

Bweranyangi Girls' Secondary School
- Bushenyi, Bushenyi District; Uganda

Information
- Type: Public Middle School and High School (8-13)
- Motto: Sow To Reap
- Established: 1912; 114 years ago
- Principal: Juliet Muzoora Atuhairwe (2017–present)
- Enrollment: 1,500+ (2014)
- Athletics: Athletics, tennis, volleyball, basketball, netball
- Website: Homepage

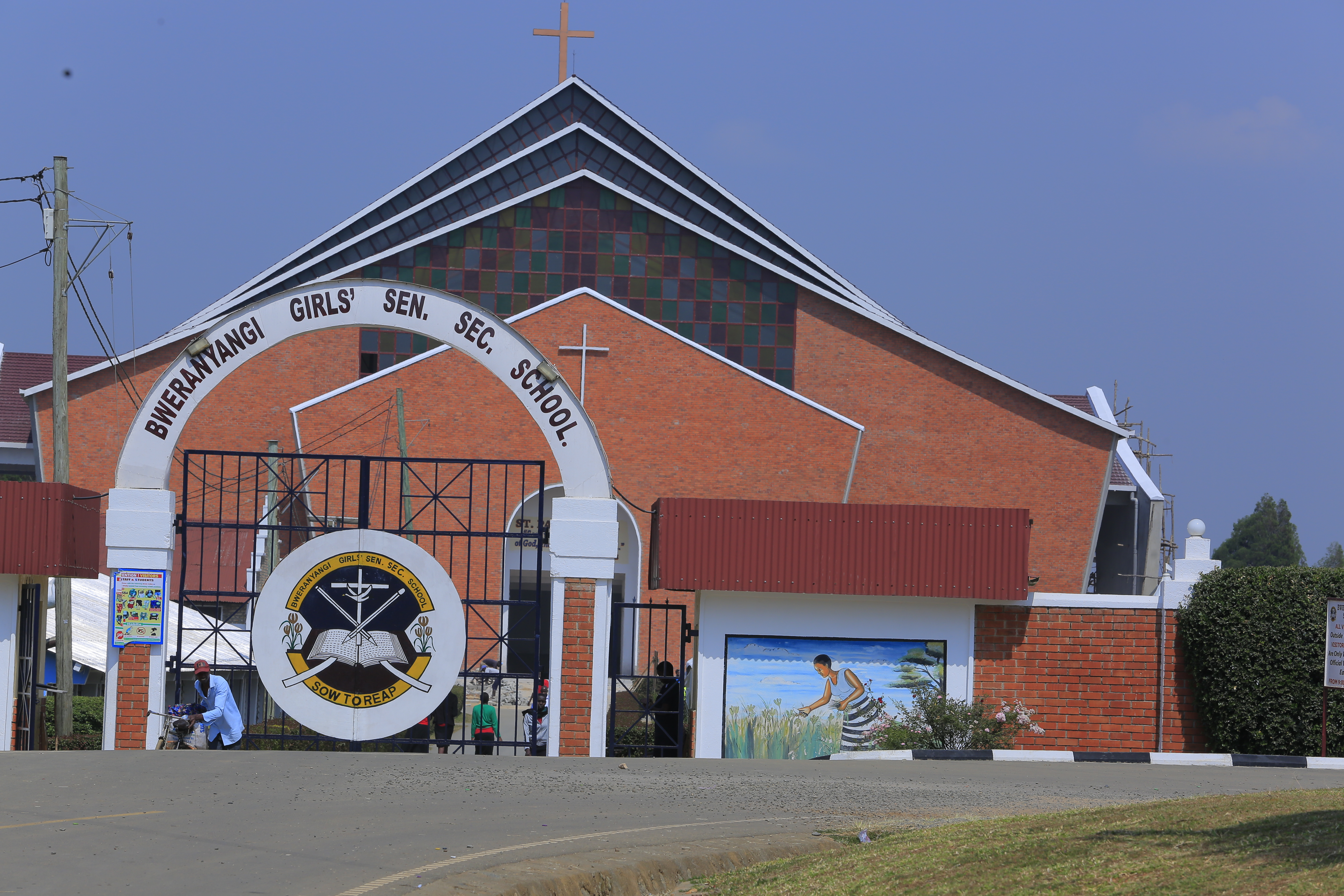
Bweranyangi Girls' Senior Secondary School

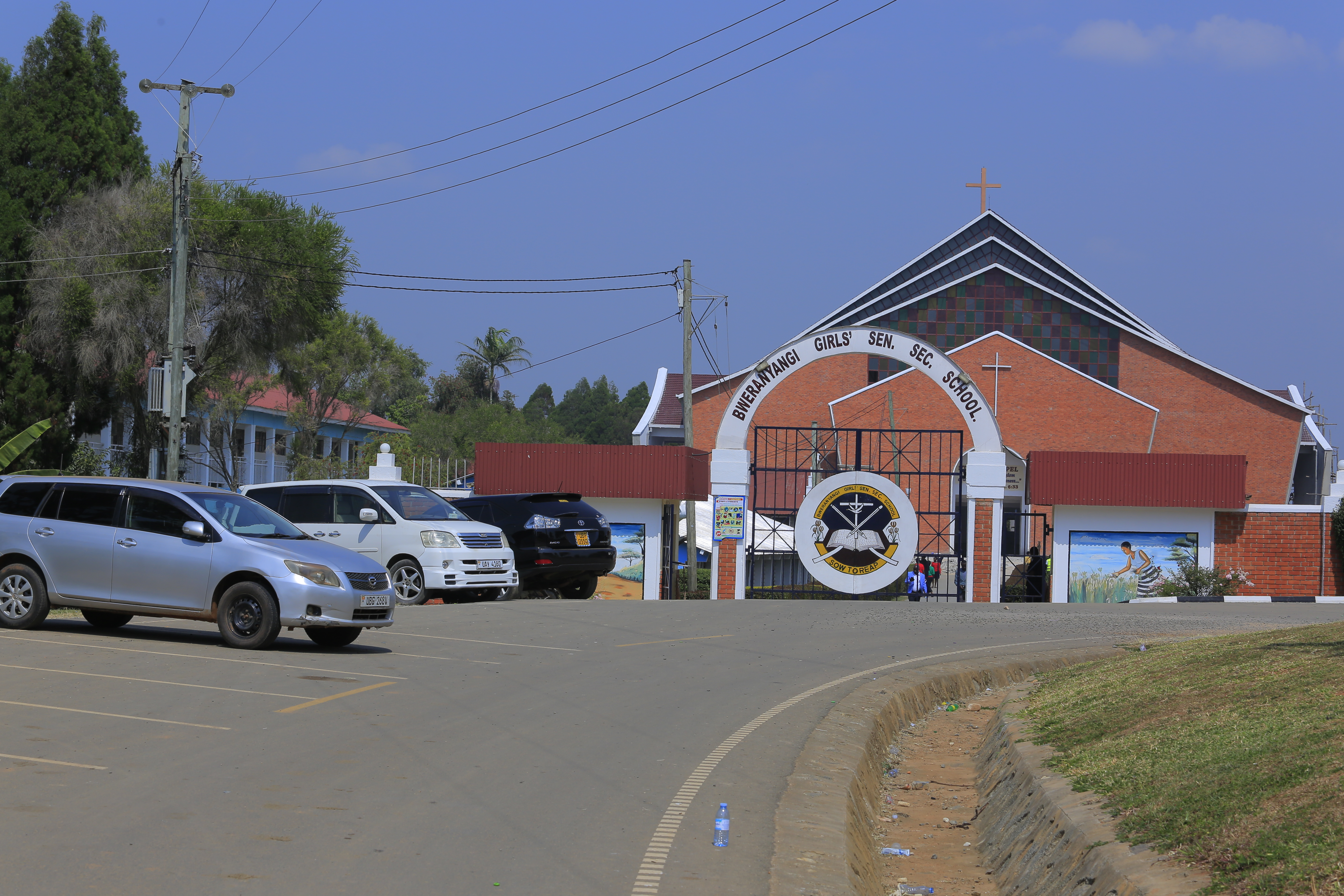
BWERANYANGI GIRLS SECONDARY SCHOOL

Bweranyangi Girls' Secondary School is a girls-only boarding middle and high school in Bushenyi District in the south Western Region of Uganda.

== Location ==
The school campus is located on Bweranyangi Hill (elevation:1,600 metres (5,200 ft)) in the southern suburbs of the town of Bushenyi. This is approximately 4.5 kilometres (3 mi), by road, south-east of the central business district of Bushenyi. Bweranyangi is approximately 55 kilometres (34 mi), by road, west of Mbarara, the largest city in the Ankole sub-region. The coordinates of the school campus are 0°33'35.0"S, 30°12'30.0"E (Latitude:-0.559722; Longitude:30.208333).

== History ==
The school traces its origins from Kamukuzi Hill in Mbarara. In 1912, the Church Missionary Society, with eight girl-students housed in a grass-thatched hut, founded the school, then known as Mbarara Junior School. The inaugural class included the daughter of the King of Ankole and one of the Ankole prime minister's daughters.

The school relocated to Ruharo Hill, also in Mbarara, in 1914, with a student population of 30. There was more land at Ruharo for expansion. This, however, placed the girls' school adjacent to Mbarara High School, a boys' school that had started in 1911. While at Ruharo, the name of the school was changed to Mbarara Girls' Boarding School. In 1954, because of frequent unwelcome visits by students from nearby Mbarara High School and the need for still more expansion, the girls' school was again relocated to Bweranyangi Hill in Bushenyi, 55 kilometres (34 mi) to the west.

In the early 1960s, the school was granted permission to start middle school (S1 to S4) and later high school (S5 to S6). The primary school was separated from the middle and high school and today exists adjacent to the secondary school as Bweranyangi Primary School, a day and boarding all-girls elementary school.

== Notable alumni ==
Notable alumni of the school include:

- Anne Kansiime, an entertainer, comedian, writer, youtuber and actress.
- Miria Matembe, former member of the Pan-African Parliament from Uganda.
- Jacqueline Mbabazi, wife of former Prime Minister Amama Mbabazi and chairperson of the National Resistance Movement Women's League.
- Pamela Mbabazi, University professor, academic, and academic administrator.
- Janet Museveni, First Lady of Uganda since 1986.
- Mary Karooro Okurut, Uganda's Cabinet Minister for General Duties in the Office of the Prime Minister.
- Victoria Kakoko Sebagereka, politician and AIDS activist

== Notable staff ==
- Yoweri Museveni - The president of Uganda taught at the school for two months in 1965.

== See also ==
- Education in Uganda
