= Jinja District =

Jinja City
- District
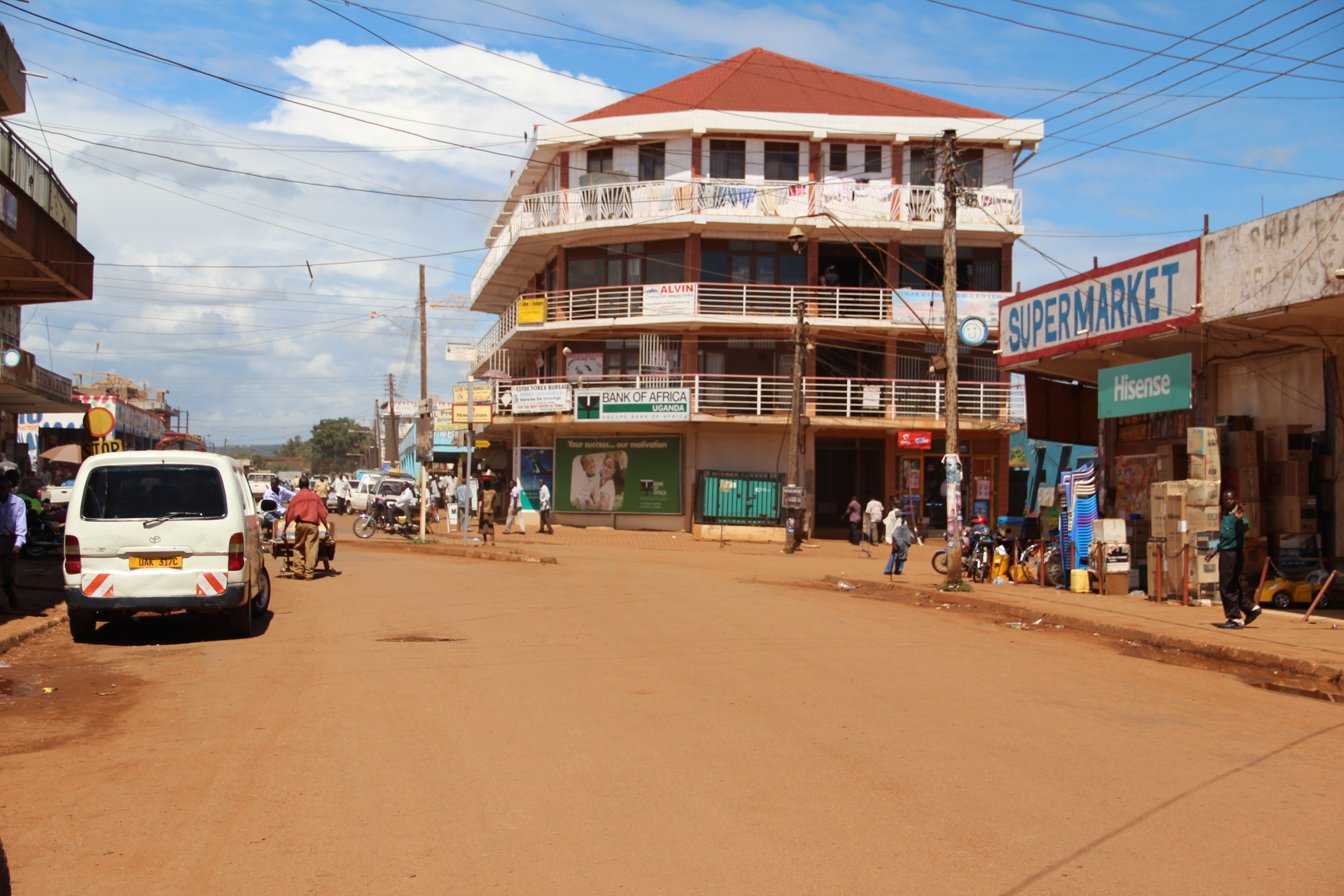
- Jinja Street view

- District location in Uganda
- Coordinates: 00°30′N 33°12′E
- Country: Uganda
- Region: Eastern Region
- Sub-region: Busoga sub-region
- Capital: Buwenge

Area
  - Land: 673 km^{2} (260 sq mi)
- Elevation: 1,200 m (3,900 ft)

Population (2012 Estimate)
  - Total: 501,300
  - Density: 744.9/km^{2} (1,929/sq mi)
- Time zone: UTC+3 (EAT)
- Website: www.jinja.go.ug

Jinja District is a district in the Eastern Region of Uganda. The town of Jinja is the district's main municipal and commercial center.

== Location ==
Jinja District is bordered by Kamuli District to the north, Luuka District to the east, Mayuge District to the south-east, Buvuma District to the south, Buikwe District to the west, and Kayunga District to the north-west. The district headquarters at Buwenge are located 96 kilometres (60 mi) east of Kampala, Uganda's capital and largest city.

== Population ==
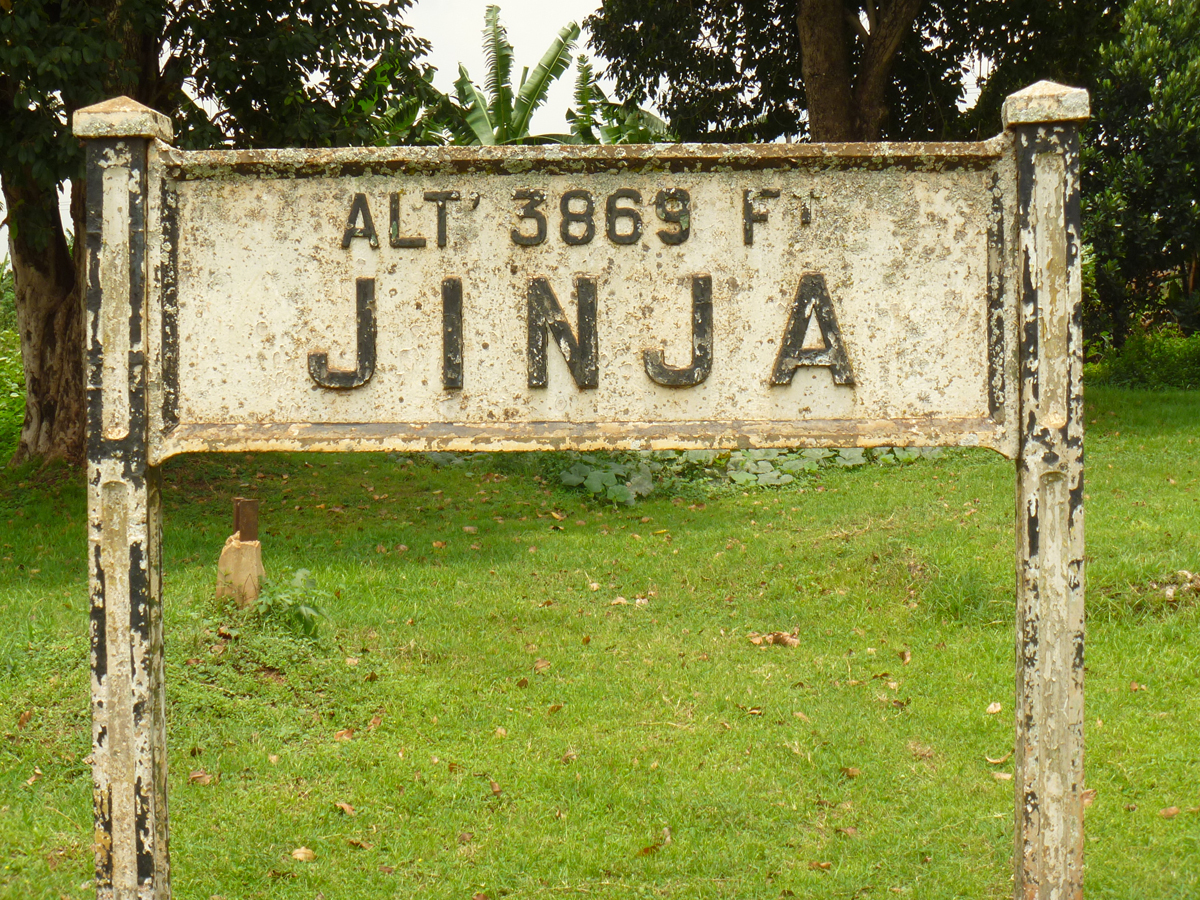
Station and elevated marker Jinja, Uganda

In 1991, the national population census estimated the district population at 289,500. The 2002 census estimated the population at 387,600, with an annual population growth rate of 2.7 percent. In 2012, the population was estimated at 501,300.

== Economic activity ==
- Fishing
- Construction
- Transport and Communication
- Brick making

== Livestock ==
- Cattle
- Goats
- Sheep
- chicken

== See also ==
- Districts of Uganda
- Eastern Region, Uganda
- Busoga sub-region
- Busoga
