= Wakiso Town =

Wakiso Wakiso Municipality
- Location in Uganda
- Coordinates: 00°24′00″N 32°28′57″E
- Country: Uganda
- Region: Central Region
- District: Wakiso District
- Elevation: 3,900 ft (1,200 m)

Population (2024 Census)
  - Total: 91,060

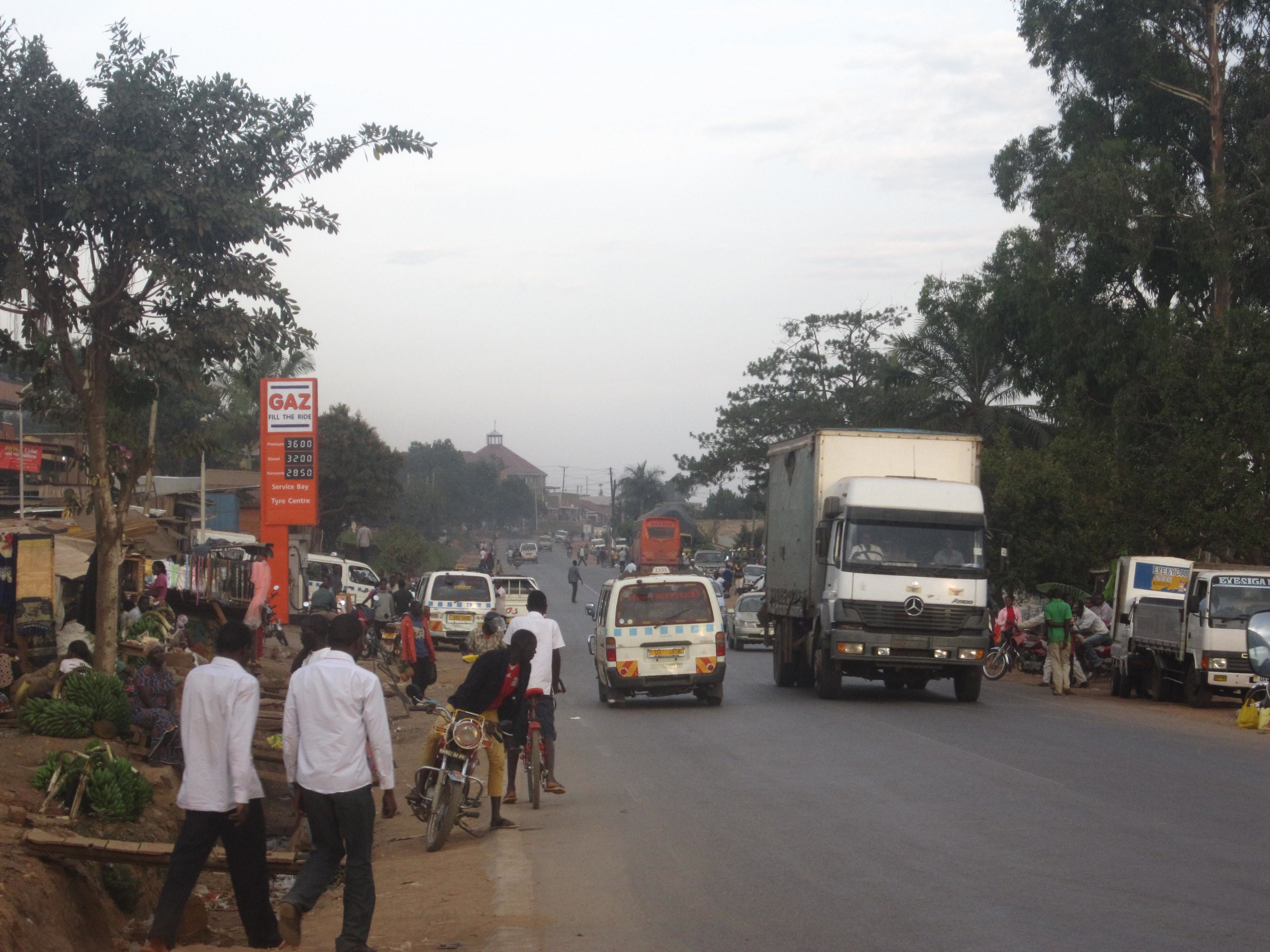
Matugga Town-Wakiso district

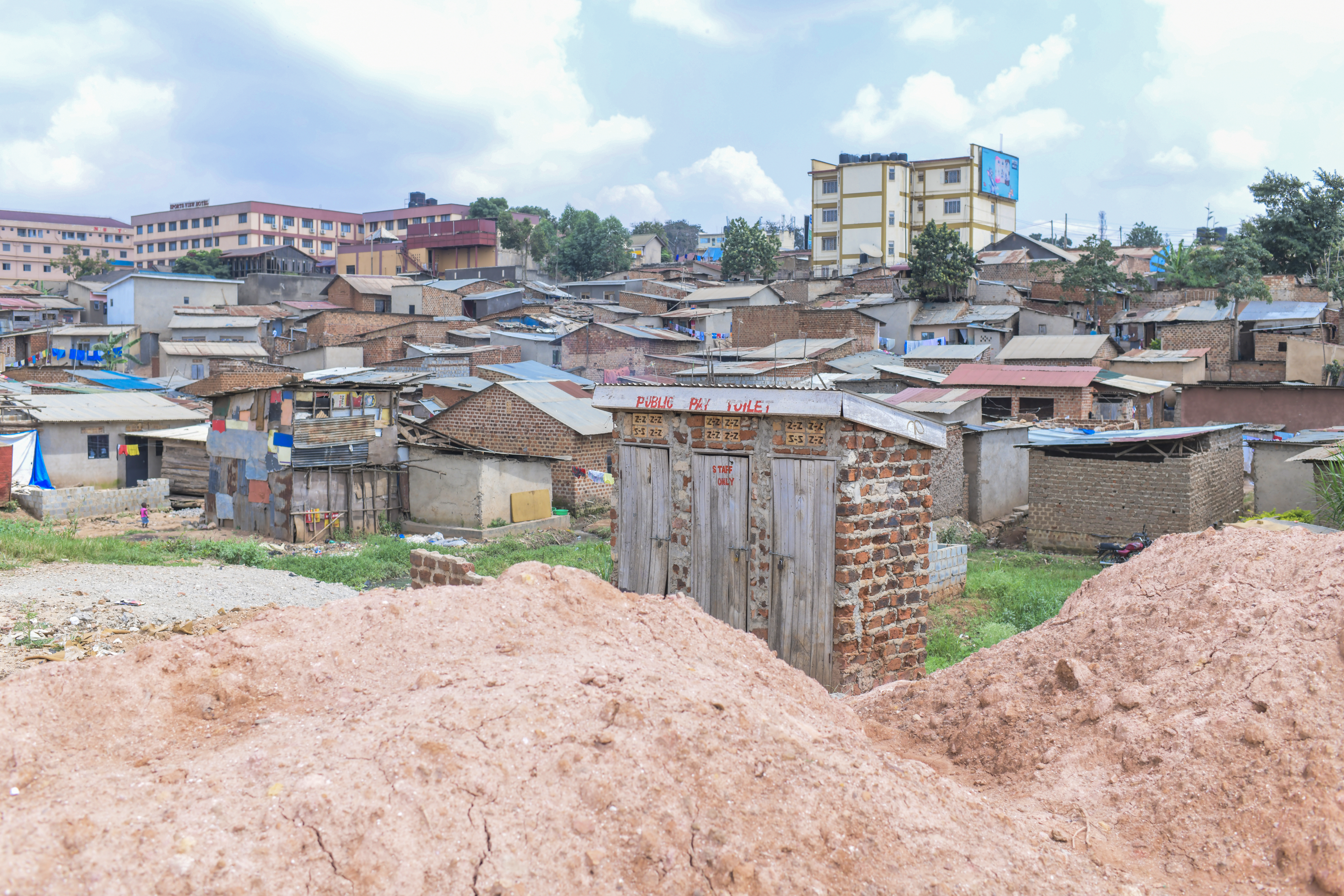
Namboole slum in Wakiso

Wakiso is a city in the Central Region of Uganda. It is the headquarters of Wakiso District.

== Geography ==
Wakiso is located on the Kampala–Hoima Highway, approximately 18 kilometres (11 mi) north-west of Kampala, Uganda's capital and largest city. The coordinates of the town are 00 24 00N, 32 28 48E (Latitude:0.4000; Longitude:32.4800).

=== Climate ===
Köppen-Geiger climate classification system classifies its climate as tropical rainforest (Af).

Climate data for Wakiso
Month	Jan	Feb	Mar	Apr	May	Jun	Jul	Aug	Sep	Oct	Nov	Dec	Year
Mean daily maximum °C (°F)	28.8 (83.8)	28.7 (83.7)	28.2 (82.8)	27.2 (81.0)	26.7 (80.1)	26.5 (79.7)	26.1 (79.0)	26.5 (79.7)	27.3 (81.1)	27.7 (81.9)	27.8 (82.0)	27.7 (81.9)	27.4 (81.4)
Daily mean °C (°F)	22.3 (72.1)	22.5 (72.5)	22.5 (72.5)	22.2 (72.0)	21.9 (71.4)	21.3 (70.3)	20.8 (69.4)	21 (70)	21.5 (70.7)	22 (72)	22.1 (71.8)	22.8 (73.0)	21.9 (71.5)
Mean daily minimum °C (°F)	15.9 (60.6)	16.3 (61.3)	16.9 (62.4)	17.2 (63.0)	17.1 (62.8)	16.2 (61.2)	15.5 (59.9)	15.6 (60.1)	15.8 (60.4)	16.4 (61.5)	16.4 (61.5)	16 (61)	16.3 (61.3)
Average precipitation mm (inches)	70 (2.8)	87 (3.4)	133 (5.2)	204 (8.0)	147 (5.8)	77 (3.0)	69 (2.7)	97 (3.8)	109 (4.3)	133 (5.2)	150 (5.9)	101 (4.0)	1,377 (54.1)
Source: Climate-Data.org (altitude: 1112m)

== Population ==
According to the national census records, Wakiso Town Council had a population of 21,096 in 1969. By the 1980 national census, the population had grown to 21,289. In 1991, the population was enumerated at 16,777 people.

The 2002 census enumerated the population at 20,073 and in the 2014 census the population of Wakiso Town was recorded as 60,210.

In 2015, the Uganda Bureau of Statistics (UBOS) estimated the population of the town at 63,500. In 2020, the population agency estimated the mid-year population at 87,900 people. Of these, 46,600 (53 percent) were females and 41,300 (47 percent) males. UBOS calculated that between 2015 and 2020 the population of Wakiso Town had expanded at an average rate of 6.7 percent annually.

Historical population
Year	Pop.	±%
1969	21,096	—
1980	21,289	+0.9%
1991	1,777	−91.7%
2014	60,210	+3288.3%
2015	63,500	+5.5%
2020	87,900	+38.4%

== Points of interest ==
The following points of interest are found in Wakiso or close to the town's borders: (a) the headquarters of Wakiso District Administration (b) the offices of Wakiso Town Council (c) Wakiso Central Market and (d) Bunamwaya Stadium, a 5,000-seat stadium and home to the Vipers SC soccer club.

The Kampala–Hoima Highway passes through the middle of town in a general northwest/southeast direction.

== See also ==
- List of cities and towns in Uganda
