= Kamuli =

Ugandan town

- Location in Uganda
- Coordinates: 00°56′42″N 33°07′30″E
- Country: Uganda
- Region: Eastern Uganda
- Sub-region: Busoga sub-region
- District: Kamuli District
- Elevation: 3,600 ft (1,100 m)

Population (2024 Census)
  - Total: 76,758

Kamuli is a town in the Eastern Region of Uganda. It is the main municipal, administrative, and commercial centre of Kamuli District, and the district headquarters are located there. The district is named after the town.

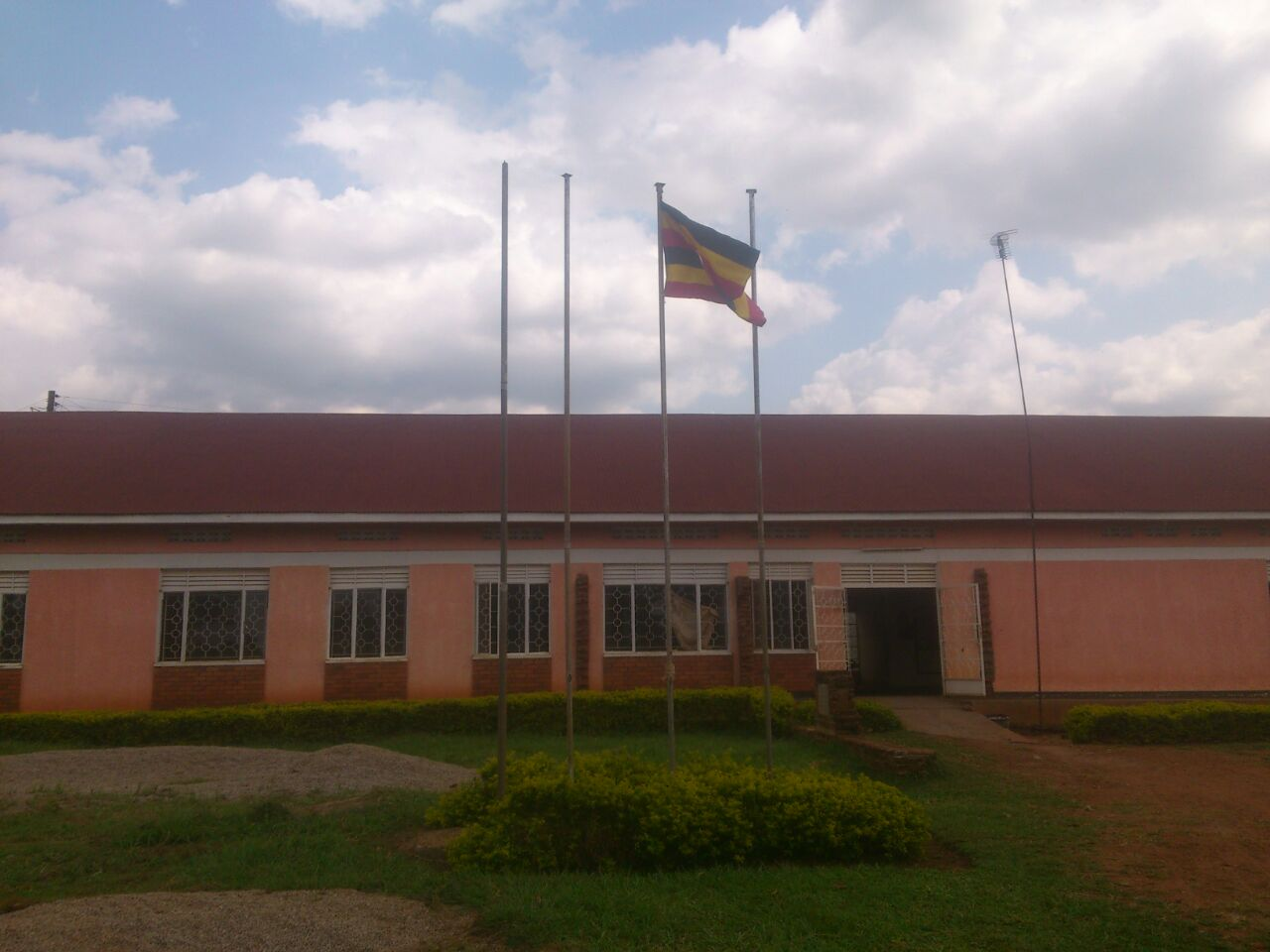
Kamuli town council.

== Location ==
Kamuli is approximately 63 kilometres (39 mi), by road, north of Jinja, the largest city in the Busoga sub-region, on an all weather tarmac road.

This town is about 131 kilometres (81 mi), by road, west of Mbale, the largest city in Uganda's Eastern Region. The coordinates of Kamuli Town are 0°56'42.0"N, 33°07'30.0"E (Latitude:0.9450; Longitude:33.1250).

== Population ==
According to the 2014 national census and population survey, the population of Kamuli Municipality was 58,984. In July 2020, the Uganda Bureau of Statistics, estimated the mid-year population of the town at 67,800.

Historical population
| Year | Pop. | ±% |
|---|---|---|
| 2014 | 58,984 | — |
| 2020 | 67,800 | +14.9% |

== Administration ==
The town is administered by a Municipal Council headed by a mayor. There is an elected Municipal Council of fifteen councillors. The annual budget for the municipality in the 2019/2020 financial year that ended on 30 June 2020 was UGX:6,921,343,000 (US$1,908,570).

== Points of interest ==
The following points of interest lie within the town limits or close to its borders:

1. The headquarters of Kamuli District Administration

2. The offices of Kamuli Town Council

3. Kamuli Central Market

4. Kamuli Mission Hospital, a 160-bed private hospital, owned by the Roman Catholic Diocese of Jinja

5. Kamuli General Hospital, a 100-bed public hospital, owned by the Ugandan Government, which serves as the district hospital for Kamuli District and surrounding communities.

6. Kamuli Sugar Limited, a sugar factory located approximately 12 kilometres (7 mi) south of Kamuli, along the Kamuli-Mbulamuti Road.

== Notable people ==
- Rebecca Kadaga, politician
