= Kamuli District =

- District
- District location in Uganda
- Coordinates: 00°55′N 33°06′E
- Country: Uganda
- Region: Eastern Region of Uganda
- Sub-region: Busoga sub-region
- Capital: Kamuli

Area
  - Land: 1,557 km^{2} (601 sq mi)
- Elevation: 1,100 m (3,600 ft)

Population (2012 Estimate)
  - Total: 500,800
  - Density: 321.6/km^{2} (833/sq mi)
- Time zone: UTC+3 (EAT)
- Website: www.kamuli.go.ug

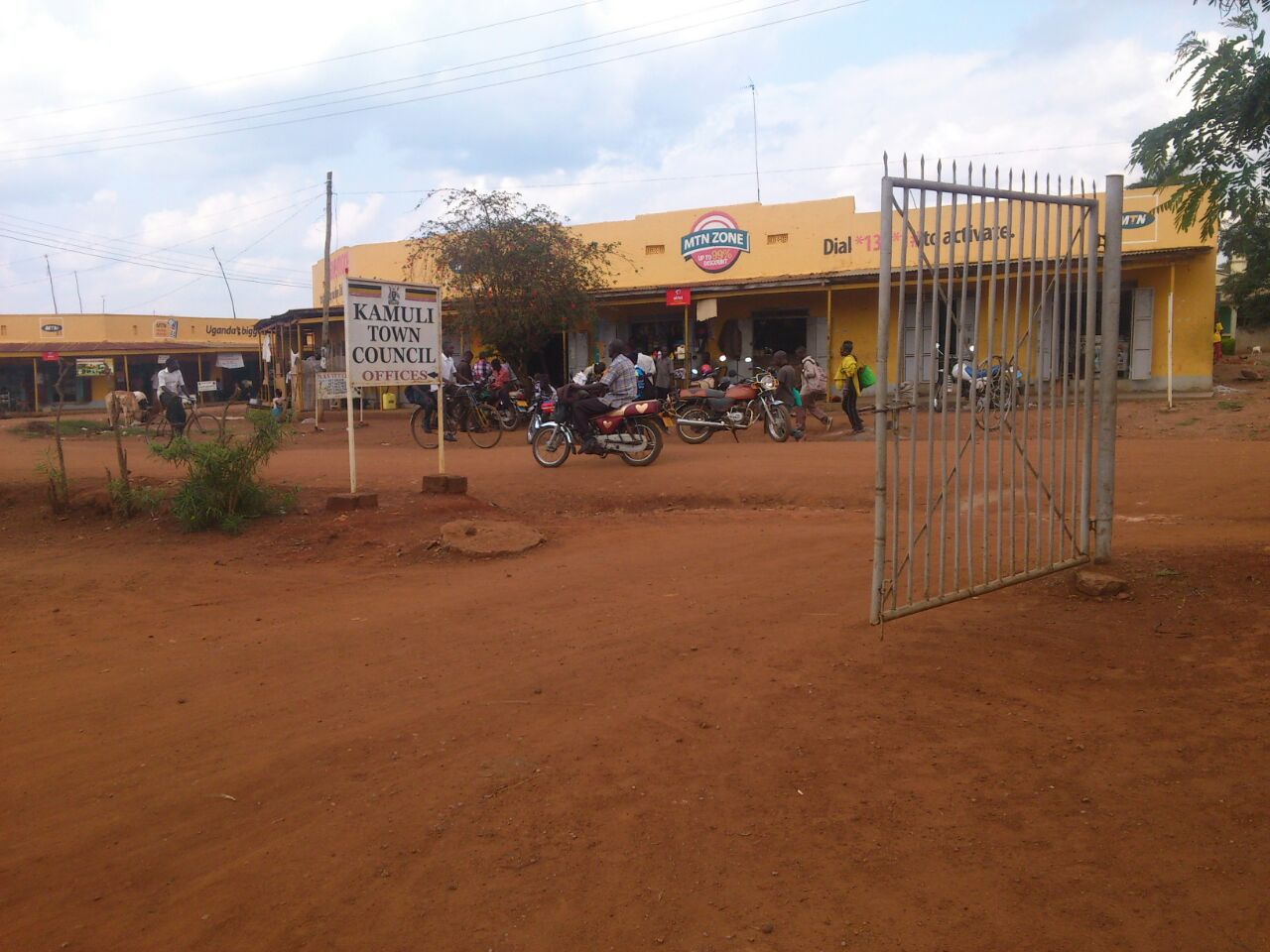
Kamuli Town council

Kamuli District is a district in the Eastern Region of Uganda. The town of Kamuli is the site of the district headquarters.

== Location ==
Kamuli District is bordered by Buyende District to the north, Luuka District to the east, Jinja District to the south, and Kayunga District to the west. The district headquarters at Kamuli are approximately 74 kilometres (46 mi), by road, north of Jinja, the largest city in the Busoga sub-region.

== Administration centers ==
Kamuli district has so many administrative units as other districts and cities. It has over three county that are further also divided into 12 sub-county, town council and division. The three county in Kamuli include:

Bugabula County. This county is divided into 10 sub county and town council, and they include the following as bellow.

- Balawoli
- Balawoli Town Council
- Bulopa
- Butansi
- Kagumba
- Kitayanjwa
- Nabwigulu
- Namasagali
- Namwendwa
- Namwendwa Town Council

Buzaaya County . Buyaaza is also made up of ten sub county and town council.

1. Bugulumbya
2. Kasambira Town council
3. Kisozi
4. Kisozi Town Council
5. Magogo
6. Mbulamuti
7. Mbulamuti Town Council
8. Nawanyago
9. Nawanyago Town council
10. Wankole

Kamuli Municipality has over two divisions and these include Northern division and Southern Division.

== Population ==
In December 1991, the district had a population of about 249,300, according to the national census. In 2002, the census estimated the population at 361,400, with 40.5 percent male and 59.5 percent female. In 2012, the population was estimated at 500,800. In 2014 the district population was estimated at 486319 and in 2024 the estimated population was 540252 .

== Ethnicity and language ==
The district is a multi-ethnic and multi-cultural society, with the predominant ethnic group being the Basoga who comprise 76 percent of the population. The Iteso people make up 3.9 percent and the Banyoro and Bagungu together make up 1.8 percent of the population. Other Ugandan ethnicities make up the remainder (18.3 percent). The predominantly language spoken in Kamuli District is Lusoga, with some Luganda and English.

The district is part of the Busoga sub-region, which is coterminous with the Kingdom of Busoga.

== Economic activities ==
Means of earning a livelihood in Kamuli District include:

- Fishing
- Ranching
- Farming
- Fish farming
- Bee keeping
- Retail trade
- Quarrying

The crops grown include the following:

- Upland rice
- Paddy rice
- Matooke
- Sweet bananas
- Maize
- Millet
- Soybeans
- Groundnuts
- Oranges
- Mangoes
- Potatoes
- Beans
- Simsim
- Sunflower
- Tomatoes
- Onions
- Coffee
- Cotton
- Sugarcane

Livestock kept includes cattle, goats, sheep, and chicken.

== Non-government organizations ==
Since 2003, Iowa State University's Center for Sustainable Rural Livelihoods has worked side-by-side with Kamuli District residents to discover and implement sustainable solutions to meeting the community's most urgent needs. Starting with farmer training, the center has evolved into programming that touches every stage of the life cycle. The Iowa State University-Uganda Program is headquartered in Kamuli.

Uganda Community Farm is a non-profit community agribusiness organisation that equips participating farmers with farming materials, offers training for growing crops adapted to local conditions, and builds market access for selling their crops. Started in 2013 as a pilot project farming 5 acres, the organisation expanded to several programs. As of 2020, the organisation has trained and supported 500 farmers within the Kamuli and Buyenda districts to grow white sorghum. Uganda Community Farm is headquartered in Kamuli.

== Notable people ==
- Patrick Kimumwe - Ugandan soldier, rebel, and author

== See also ==
- Districts of Uganda
- Parliament of Uganda
- 2026 Ugandan general election
- Eastern Region, Uganda
