= Busia =

Busia may refer to:

== Places ==
- Busia, Kenya, a town on the border with Uganda
  - Busia County
- Busia, Uganda, a town on the border with Kenya
  - Busia District

== People ==
- Kofi Abrefa Busia, Prime Minister of Ghana 1969–1972
- Akosua Busia (born 1966), Ghanaian-American actress
