= Masafu General Hospital =

- Uganda Ministry of Health
- Location within Uganda

Geography
- Location: Masafu, Busia District, Eastern Region, Uganda
- Coordinates: 00°24′48″N 34°02′05″E

Organisation
- Care system: Public
- Type: General

Services
- Emergency department: I
- Beds: 100

History
- Founded: 2010

Links
- Other links: Hospitals in Uganda

Masafu General Hospital, also Masafu Hospital, is a hospital in the Eastern Region of Uganda.

== Location ==
The hospital is in the town of Masafu on the Musita–Mayuge–Lumino–Majanji–Busia Road in Busia District, Uganda, about 150 kilometres (93 mi) east of the Jinja Regional Referral Hospital. This is approximately 106 kilometres (66 mi), by road, south of Mbale Regional Referral Hospital. The coordinates of Masafu General Hospital are: 00°24'48.0"N, 34°02'05.0"E (Latitude:0.413333; Longitude:34.034722).

== Overview ==
Masafu General Hospital was established in 2010 when the Masafu Health Centre IV was upgraded to hospital status. The hospital attends to a large number of HIV/AIDS patients. This hospital is on the list of general hospitals earmarked for renovation and expansion.

== See also ==
- List of hospitals in Uganda
