= Uganda Co-operative Bank =

- Company type: Public company
- Industry: Financial services
- Founded: 2024 (Expected)
- Headquarters: Kampala, Uganda

Uganda Co-operative Bank is a proposed commercial bank expected to be established in Uganda, the third-largest economy in the East African Community. The new institution is expected to "enhance the availability of affordable financing to viable projects in agriculture and micro and medium scale enterprises development" in the country.

== Overview ==
Uganda's co-operative societies, traders and farmers experience difficulty in accessing loans from commercial banks, on account of high interest rates and unfavorable repayment terms. In June 2016, Amelia Kyambadde, the Minister of Trade, Industry and Cooperatives (MoITC), disclosed that the Ugandan cabinet had approved the establishment of Uganda Cooperative Bank. The MoITC is "tasked with coordinating enterprise-based cooperative movements to merge into the bank".

== History ==
An institution with the same name was established in the 1960s as a commercial bank. That bank was closed on 19 May 1999, by the late Charles Kikonyogo, the governor of the Bank of Uganda at that time. The reasons given for its closure were "inadequate capitalization" and "insolvency to the tune Sh4.8 billion, as at 31 December 1998". The EastAfrican reported in June 1999, that the bank's collapse was as a result of the withdrawal of support by USAID, and a case of fraud involving bank officials.

Since 2008, there have been efforts to re-open the bank or create a replacement. In June 2019, Amelia Kyambadde, Uganda's Minister of Trade, Industry and Cooperatives set a target of 2021 for the establishment of the bank.

== Shareholding ==
The shareholders in the new bank are expected to include the following, among others: 1. Kyankwanzi Sacco Limited 2. West Mengo Cooperative Union Limited 3. Bunyoro Growers’ Cooperative Union 4. East Mengo Cooperative Union Limited 5. West Acholi Cooperative Union Limited and 6. Masaka Cooperative Union Limited.

== Developments ==
In August 2023 Frederick Ngobi Gume, the Ugandan State Minister for Cooperatives inaugurated the restoration committee established to steer the creation of the bank. To distinguish it from the defunct institution created in the 1960s and abolished in 1999, the new bank will be known as the National Cooperative Bank. The restoration committee has 90 days to produce its report.

== See also ==
- Banking in Uganda
- List of banks in Uganda
