= Tilda Uganda =

Rice growing and processing company in Uganda

Coordinates: 00°32′06″N 33°52′31″E

Tilda Uganda Limited
- Company type: Private
- Industry: Manufacture & Marketing of Rice
- Founded: 1996
- Headquarters: Kibimba, Uganda
- Key people: Venugopal Pookat; Executive Director
- Products: Rice

Tilda Uganda Limited is a rice growing and processing company in the Eastern Region of Uganda.

== Location ==
The company headquarters and factory are located on a 3,900 hectares (9,637 acres) estate in the community of Kibimba, along the Jinja–Iganga–Bugiri–Tororo Road, about 18 kilometres (11 mi) east of the town of Bugiri. This is about 89 kilometres (55 mi) east of Jinja, the largest city in the sub-region. The coordinates of the company headquarters and factory are 0°32'06.0"N, 33°52'31.0"E (Latitude:0.535005; Longitude:33.875280).

== Overview ==
The Kibimba Rice Scheme, was established by President Idi Amin with China in 1973. In 1996, Tilda Limited acquired the property. They applied to the International Finance Corporation for a US$2 million loan, as part of the funding required to rehabilitate the estate for growing, manufacturing, marketing and distribution of rice and rice products. It is estimated that in 2011, Tilda Uganda Limited was producing about 20,000 metric tonnes of refined rice grain annually.

== Ownership ==
TUL is a wholly owned subsidiary of Tilda Limited, a rice and related food products company headquartered in Rainham, (England), with offices in Dubai, (UAE) and Delhi (India).

== Other considerations ==
Some of the members of the family that founded Tilda Limited, were born or lived in Uganda for part of their lives.

== See also ==
- Kibimba
- Bugiri District
- Eastern Uganda
- Uganda Economy
