= Musita–Mayuge–Lumino–Majanji–Busia Road =

Road in Uganda

Coordinates: 00°22′52″N 33°50′09″E

Route information
- Length: 65 mi (105 km)
- History: Designated in 2015; Expected completion in 2019

Major junctions
- West end: Musita
- Mayuge; Namayingo; Lumino
- East end: Busia

Location
- Country: Uganda

Highway system
- Roads in Uganda

The Musita–Mayuge–Lumino–Majanji–Busia Road is a road in the Eastern Region of Uganda, connecting the town of Musita in Mayuge District to Busia in Busia District at the international border with Kenya.

== Location ==
The road starts at Musita, a small town on the Jinja–Iganga road, approximately 25 kilometres (16 mi) east of Jinja. The road continues in an easterly direction, through Mayuge, Namayingo, and Lumino. At Lumino, a southern spur, measuring about 8 kilometres (5 mi), goes south to Majanji on the northern shores of Lake Victoria. The main road makes a northerly turn to end at the border town of Busia (2014 population 55,958).

== Overview ==
The road connects the districts of Mayuge, Bugiri, Namayingo, and Busia. As described, including the spur to Majanji, the entire road project measures 104 kilometres (65 mi).

== Upgrading to bitumen ==
Before 2015, the road was unsealed gravel surface. In February 2015, the Ugandan government began the process of upgrading the road to class II bitumen surface. The first contractor for this project was the China Railway 18th Bureau Group Company, Limited (CR18), a subsidiary of the China Railway Construction Corporation. The budgeted cost of the project was UGX:207 billion. Completion of the road works was planned for August 2017.

In May 2017, the Uganda National Roads Authority (UNRA) conducted an onsite inspection and found that CR18 had completed only 12 percent of the works with only three months left until the project completion deadline. In a letter dated 12 June 2017, UNRA Executive Director Allen Kagina canceled the contract, citing CR18's alleged incompetence, performance below contractual standards, lack of commitment to the project, and failure to mobilise resources and equipment to ensure timely completion of work. She ordered the Chinese contractor to vacate the construction site immediately. UNRA planned to re-advertise the road and select a new contractor to complete the project.

A new contractor was hired, at a revised cost of USh208 billion (approx. US$55 million). The new construction company, China Railway Group Limited, scheduled completion for October 2019. The competed road was commissioned by Yoweri Museveni, the president of Uganda, in August 2021. It was reported by Construction Review Online that the construction bill was US$55 million, paid in full by the government of Uganda.

== See also ==
- List of roads in Uganda
- Economy of Uganda
- Transport in Uganda
