= Namayingo =

- Location in Uganda
- Coordinates: 00°20′42″N 33°52′48″E
- Country: Uganda
- Region: Eastern Region of Uganda
- Sub-region: Busoga sub-region
- District: Namayingo District
- Elevation: 4,186 ft (1,276 m)

Population (2020 Estimate)
  - Total: 17,300
- Website: www.namayingo.go.ug

Namayingo is a town in Namayingo District in the Eastern Region of Uganda. It is the site of the district headquarters.

== Location ==
Namayingo is on the mainland in the Busoga sub-region and is approximately 31 kilometres (19 mi), by road, southeast of Bugiri, the nearest large town. This is approximately 88 kilometres (55 mi), by road, southeast of Jinja, the largest city in the Busoga sub-region.

Namayingo Town is located along the Musita–Mayuge–Lumino–Majanji–Busia Road, approximately 35 kilometres (22 mi), southwest of Busia, the nearest large city. The coordinates of Namayingo are 0°20'42.0"N, 33°52'48.0"E (Latitude:0.3450; Longitude:33.8800). Namayingo Town sits at an average elevation of 1,276 metres (4,186 ft) above mean sea level.

== Overview ==
The town of Namayingo is small and dusty and lacks public running water, electricity, or a sewer system. The public roads are notoriously bad, prompting a public demonstration numbering about 200 people in January 2013.

In 2020, the Musita–Lumino–Busia Road, which passes through town and has been under improvement to class II bitumen standard since 2015, was commissioned in November 2020, upon completion of those renovations. The renovated road has led to faster travel times and improved the ease of doing business in Namayingo Town, Namayingo District and surrounding communities.

== Population ==
In September 2002, the population census put the population of Namayingo at 8,332. In August 2014, the national population census put the population at 15,741.

In 2015 the Uganda Bureau of Statistics (UBOS) estimated the population of the town at 15,900. In 2020, the population agency estimated the population of Namayingo Town at 17,300 people. Of these, 9,100 (52.6 percent) were female and 8,200 (47.4 percent) were male. UBOS calculated the annual growth rate of the town's population to average 1.70 percent, between 2015 and 2020.

== Points of interest ==
The following additional points of interest lie within the town limits or near its borders:

1. The offices of Namayingo Town Council

2. The offices of Namayingo District Local Government

3. Namayingo Central Market

4. Buyinja Health Centre IV, a government healthcare facility owned by the Uganda Ministry of Health, administered by the Namayingo District Administration.

5. Musita–Mayuge–Lumino–Majanji–Busia Road, passing through town in a general west to east direction.

6. Holy Resurrection Orthodox Church, in Buhemba sub-county, approximately 17 kilometres (11 mi), southwest of town, off of the Namayingo–Maruba Road.
