= Masafu =

- Map of Uganda showing the location of Masafu
- Coordinates: 00°24′43″N 34°02′07″E
- Country: Uganda
- Region: Eastern Uganda
- District: Busia District
- Time zone: UTC+3 (EAT)

Masafu is a town in the Eastern Region of Uganda.

== Location ==
Masafu lies in Busia District, on the Musita–Mayuge–Lumino–Majanji–Busia Road, about 10 kilometres (6 mi) southwest of Busia, where the district headquarters are located. This is approximately 193 kilometres (120 mi) east of Kampala, the capital and largest city in the country. The coordinates of Masafu are 0°24'43.0"N, 34°02'07.0"E (Latitude:0.411936; Longitude:34.0352810).

== Points of interest ==
The following points of interest lie within the town limits or close to the edges of town:

- Masafu General Hospital, a government-owned public hospital, with planned bed capacity of 100.
- Musita–Mayuge–Lumino–Majanji–Busia Road, a national road, under upgrade to class II bitumen surface, with completion expected in August 2017.

== See also ==
- Busia District
- List of hospitals in Uganda
