= Jinja–Iganga–Bugiri–Tororo Road =

Road in Uganda

Coordinates: 00°34′21″N 33°34′46″E

Route information
- Length: 81 mi (130 km)

Major junctions
- West end: Jinja
- Iganga; Bugiri; Busitema
- East end: Tororo

Location
- Country: Uganda

Highway system
- Roads in Uganda

The Jinja–Iganga–Bugiri–Tororo Road is a road in the Eastern Region of Uganda, connecting the towns of Jinja and Tororo. Sometimes referred to as Tororo–Jinja Road, it is a busy transport corridor, connecting traffic from neighboring Kenya, and northeastern Uganda to Jinja, a major commercial and industrial center, and ultimately to Kampala, the country's capital, and beyond.

== Location ==
The road starts at Jinja, in Jinja District, proceeding eastwards, through Bugembe and Kakira, Iganga, Bugiri and Busitema, to end at Tororo Corner, where it merges with Tororo–Mbale–Soroti Road and with Tororo–Malaba Road, a total distance of about 131 kilometres (81 mi).

== Overview ==
The road is an all-weather tarmac, single carriageway road in good condition. This road is part of the Northern Corridor, a road system that connects the East African cities of Bujumbura, in Burundi, Kigali, in Rwanda and Kampala, in Uganda to Nairobi, in Kenya and ultimately to the Kenyan port of Mombasa. The road is a vital commercial link to the outside world for the three land-locked countries. It is also a vital road link to the sea, for many parts of eastern Democratic Republic of the Congo.

== Points of interest ==
The following points of interest lie along or near the Jinja–Iganga–Bugiri–Tororo Road:

1. The town of Bugembe, the headquarters of Busoga.
2. The town of Kakira, the headquarters of the Madhvani Group.
3. This road meets the Musita–Mayuge–Lumino–Majanji–Busia Road at Musita.
4. Busoga University, in the town of Iganga.
5. Iganga General Hospital in the town of Iganga
6. This road intersects with the Iganga–Tirinyi–Kamonkoli–Mbale Road, at Nakalama, about 7 kilometres (4 mi) northeast of Iganga.
7. Bugiri General Hospital in the town of Bugiri.
8. Headquarters and factory of Tilda Uganda Limited, the largest commercial rice project in Uganda, located at Kibimba, about 18 kilometres (11 mi) east of Bugiri.
9. The main campus of Busitema University at Busitema.
10. The headquarters and factory of Tororo Cement Limited at Tororo.

== See also ==
- List of roads in Uganda
- List of cities and towns in Uganda
