= Lumino, Uganda =

Lumino
- Map of Uganda showing the location of Lumino.
- Coordinates: 00°19′30″N 33°59′45″E
- Country: Uganda
- District: Busia District
- Elevation: 1,080 m (3,540 ft)

Population (2014 Census)
  - Total: 14,624
- Time zone: UTC+3 (EAT)

Lumino is a settlement in the Eastern Region of Uganda.

== Location ==
Lumino is located approximately 21 kilometres (13 mi), by road, south of Busia, the nearest large town and the location of the district headquarters. This location is approximately 186 kilometres (116 mi), by road, east of Kampala, the largest city and capital of Uganda. The coordinates of Lumino are 0°19'30.0"N, 33°59'45.0"E (Latitude:0.324997, Longitude:33.995831).

== Population ==
The 27 August 2014 national census enumerated the population of Lumino sub-county at 14,624.

== Landmarks ==
The landmarks within the town limits or close to the edges of town include: Musita–Mayuge–Lumino–Majanji–Busia Road - the road continues northwards for 21 kilometres (13 mi) to Busia. Also at Lumino, a southern spur of the road continues for 10 kilometres (6 mi) to the northern shores of Lake Victoria at Majanji.

== See also ==
- Busia District, Uganda
- Majanji
