= Bugiri General Hospital =

- Uganda Ministry of Health

Geography
- Location: Bugiri, Bugiri District, Eastern Region, Uganda
- Coordinates: 00°34′25″N 33°44′33″E

Organisation
- Care system: Public
- Type: General

Services
- Emergency department: I
- Beds: 100

History
- Founded: 1967

Links
- Other links: Hospitals in Uganda

Bugiri General Hospital, also Bugiri District Hospital, or Bugiri Hospital, is a hospital in the Eastern Region of Uganda.

== Location ==
The hospital is on the Jinja–Tororo highway, in the town of Bugiri, about 71 kilometres (44 mi), east of Jinja Regional Referral Hospital. The coordinates of Bugiri General Hospital are: 0°34'25.0"N, 33°44'33.0"E (Latitude:0.573605; Longitude:33.742501).

== Overview ==
Bugiri General Hospital is a 100-bed, government-owned hospital. It serves Bugiri District and parts of the districts of Iganga, Busia, Namayingo Mayuge and Namutumba.

The hospital was built in 1967 by the Obote I government. Over the years, the hospital infrastructure has deteriorated, the equipment has become antiquated and hospital has become under-staffed. The remaining workers are overworked, underpaid, poorly funded and under-motivated.

== Renovations ==
In November 2015, the Uganda Ministry of Health contracted Alliance Technical Services Limited to carry out repairs to the hospital at a budgeted sum of UGX:699,856,460. The repair work is expedience to conclude in August 2016.

== See also ==
- List of hospitals in Uganda
