= Hellen Auma Wandera =

Ugandan politician

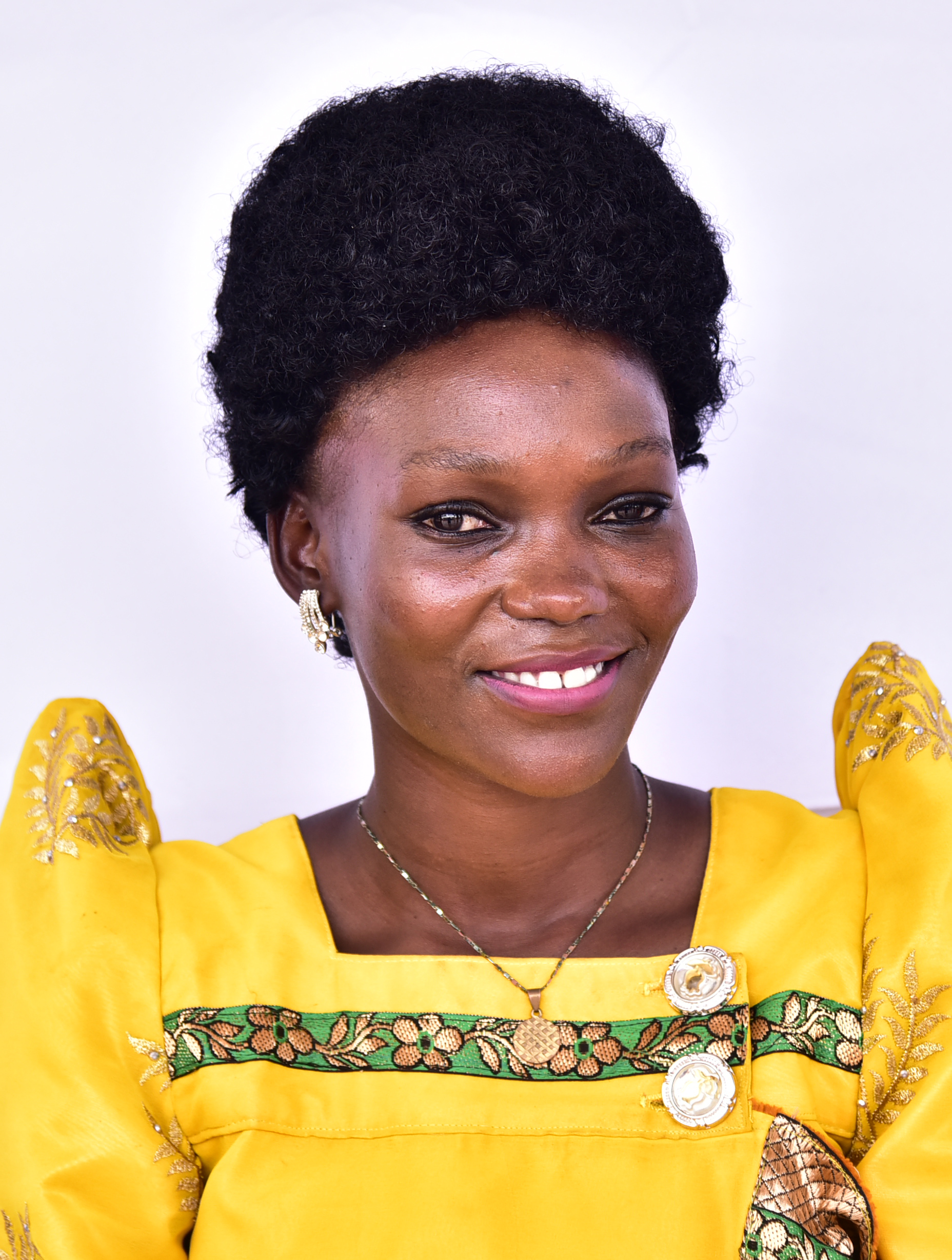
- Auma Hellen Wandera
- Born: Busia District
- Citizenship: Ugandan
- Education: Busia Parents Primary School; Great Obrem Memorial in Tororo District; St. Peters Naalya (Spena International); Kyambogo University
- Occupation: Politician
- Employer: Parliament of Uganda
- Known for: Politics
- Title: Member of Parliament
- Predecessor: Jane Nabulindo Kwoba
- Political party: National Resistance Movement (NRM)
- Parent(s): Dickson Wandera and Betty Afuro

Hellen Auma Wandera is a Ugandan politician who is the Busia District Women Representative elect in Uganda's elect 11th Parliament. She serves on the Committee on Presidential Affairs in the eleventh parliament of Uganda.

== Background and education ==
Hellen Auma Wandera was born in Busia District to Dickson Wandera and Betty Afuro. She went to Busia Parents Primary School for PLE, then to Great Obrem Memorial in Tororo District for her UCE and St. Peters Naalya (Spena International) for her high school (UACE) before joining Kyambogo University for her Bachelor of Arts And Social Science.

== Political career ==
She is affiliated to the National Resistance Movement (NRM). She defeated Nina Nekesa, Fiona Nakku, Nabwire Sharon Veron Namumayi, Esther Busingye Wafula, Grace Nyakecho, Teddy Auma and Lilian Taaka in the 2020 NRM Parliamentary Primaries. She replaced Jane Nabulindo Kwoba as the Woman Member of Parliament for Busia District in Uganda's 2021 general election.

== See also ==
- Amelia Kyambadde
- Barbara Oundo Nekesa
- Jane Nabulindo Kwoba
- Cabinet of Uganda
- Parliament of Uganda
