= Busia, Kenya =

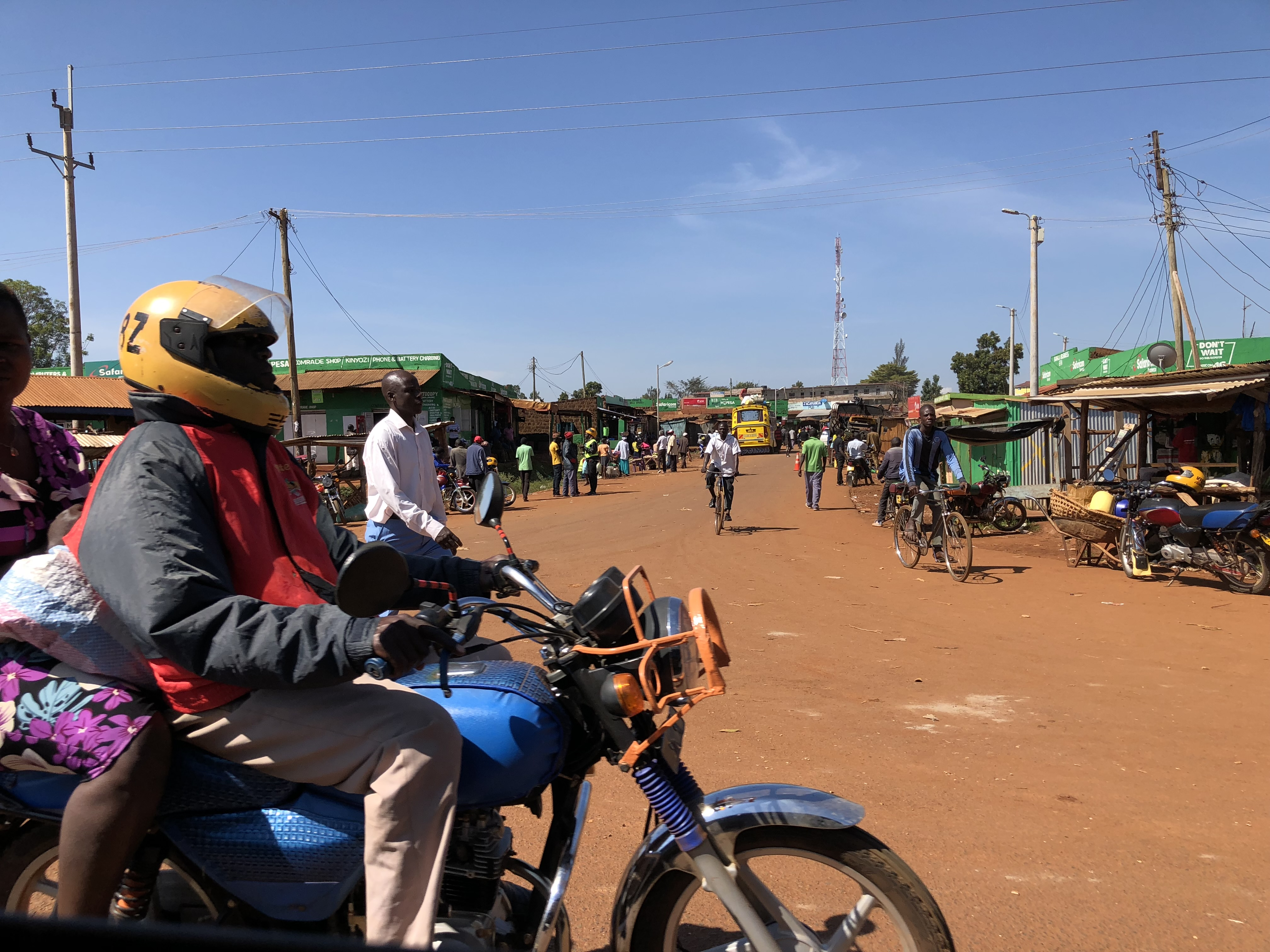
- in 2018

- Location in Kenya
- Coordinates: 00°27′48″N 34°06′19″E
- Country: Kenya
- County: Busia County
- Elevation: 4,026 ft (1,227 m)

Population (2019)
  - Total: 71,886
- Climate: Af

Busia is a town in Kenya. It is the capital and largest town of Busia County.

== Geography ==
Busia, Kenya is located in Busia County, approximately 451 kilometres (280 mi), by road, northwest of Nairobi, Kenya's capital and largest city. This location is immediately east of Busia, Uganda. The coordinates of Busia, Kenya are: 00°27'48.0"N, 34°06'19.0"E (Latitude:0.463333; Longitude:34.105278). Busia, Kenya sits at an average elevation of 1,227 metres (4,026 ft), above sea level.

== Overview ==
The towns of Busia, Kenya and Busia, Uganda are border towns on Kenya's border with Uganda. The towns of Malaba, Kenya and Malaba, Uganda, approximately 29 kilometres (18 mi) to the north, along with the Busia megalopolis account for the bulk of trade and human traffic between the two East African Community countries.

In July 2017, the construction of a one-stop-border-crossing between Busia, Kenya and Busia, Uganda was concluded. The construction on the Uganda side was completed in May 2016. The common upgraded border crossing was commissioned in February 2018, jointly by former president Uhuru Kenyatta of Kenya and president Yoweri Museveni of Uganda.

In 2021 it was reported that large quantities of Ugandan sugar were being smuggled into Kenya through Busia. Sugar in Kenya was more expensive and the failure of Kenyan sugar production industries meant that sugar could achieve an even higher price.

== Population ==
The 2019 Kenyan census recorded Busia's population as 71,886.

== Education ==
Local Catherine Omanyo moved the school she founded, now named "International School for Champions", here after unrest in Nairobi in 2007.

== See also ==
- Busia District, Uganda
