= Kibimba =

- Location in Uganda
- Coordinates: 00°31′47″N 33°51′50″E
- Country: Uganda
- Region: Eastern Region
- Sub-Region: Busoga
- District: Bugiri District

Kibimba, is a settlement in Bugiri District, in the Eastern Region of Uganda.

== Location ==
The settlement is located on the Jinja–Iganga–Bugiri–Tororo Road, approximately 45 kilometres (28 mi) west of Tororo and about 86 kilometres (53 mi) east of Jinja. The coordinates of Kibimba are 0°31'47.0"N, 33°51'50.0"E (Latitude:0.529728; Longitude:33.863884).

== Points of interest ==
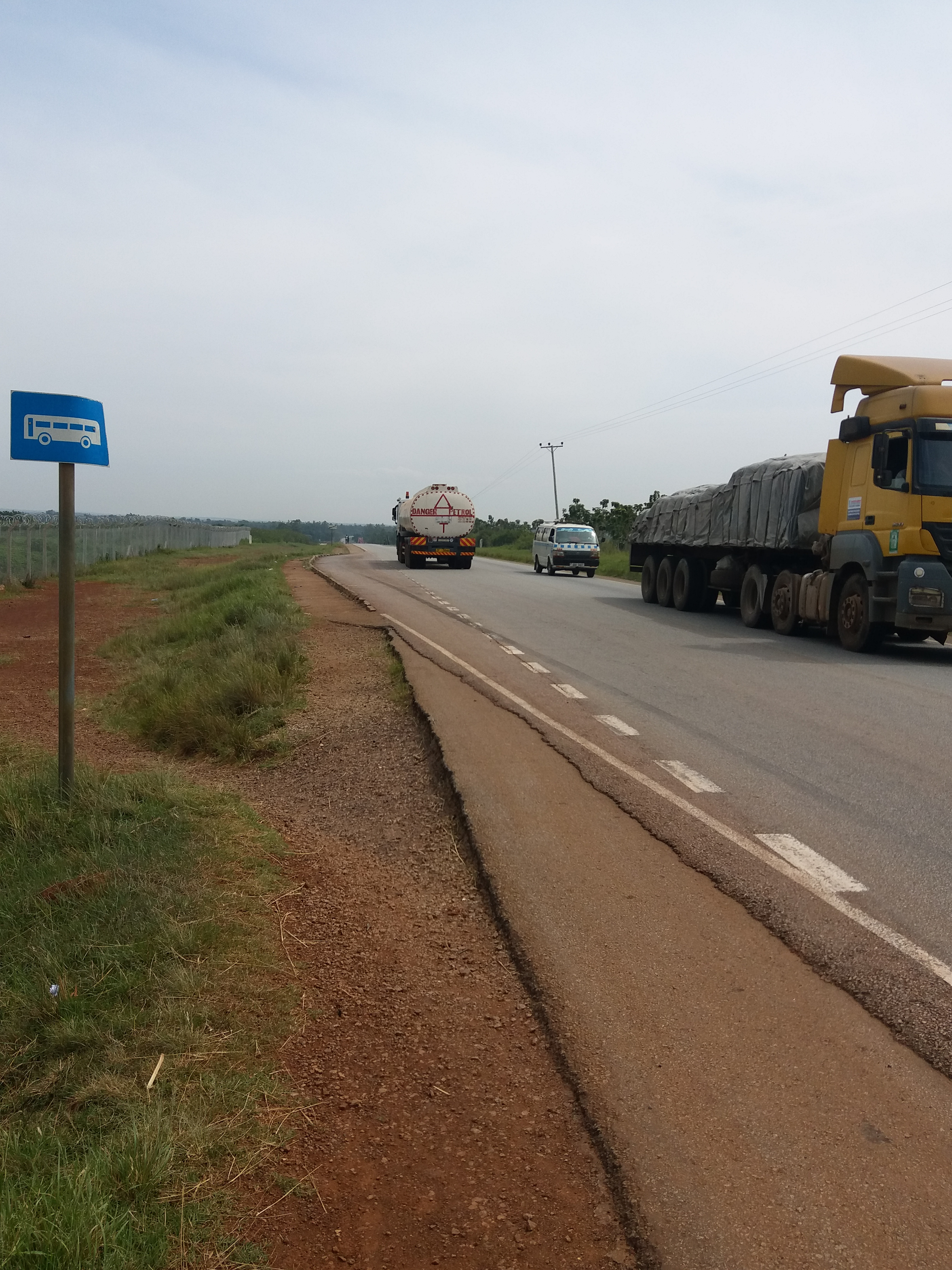
Road to Kibimba

The town is the location of the headquarters and factory of Tilda Uganda Limited, the largest commercial rice grower and processor in the country.

== See also ==
- Jinja–Iganga–Bugiri–Tororo Road
