= Kyambadde =

Kyambadde is a surname. Notable people with the surname include:

- Allan Kyambadde (born 1996), Ugandan footballer
- Amelia Kyambadde (born 1955), Ugandan politician
