= Railway stations in Uganda =

Railway stations in Uganda include:

== Towns served by rail ==
=== Existing ===
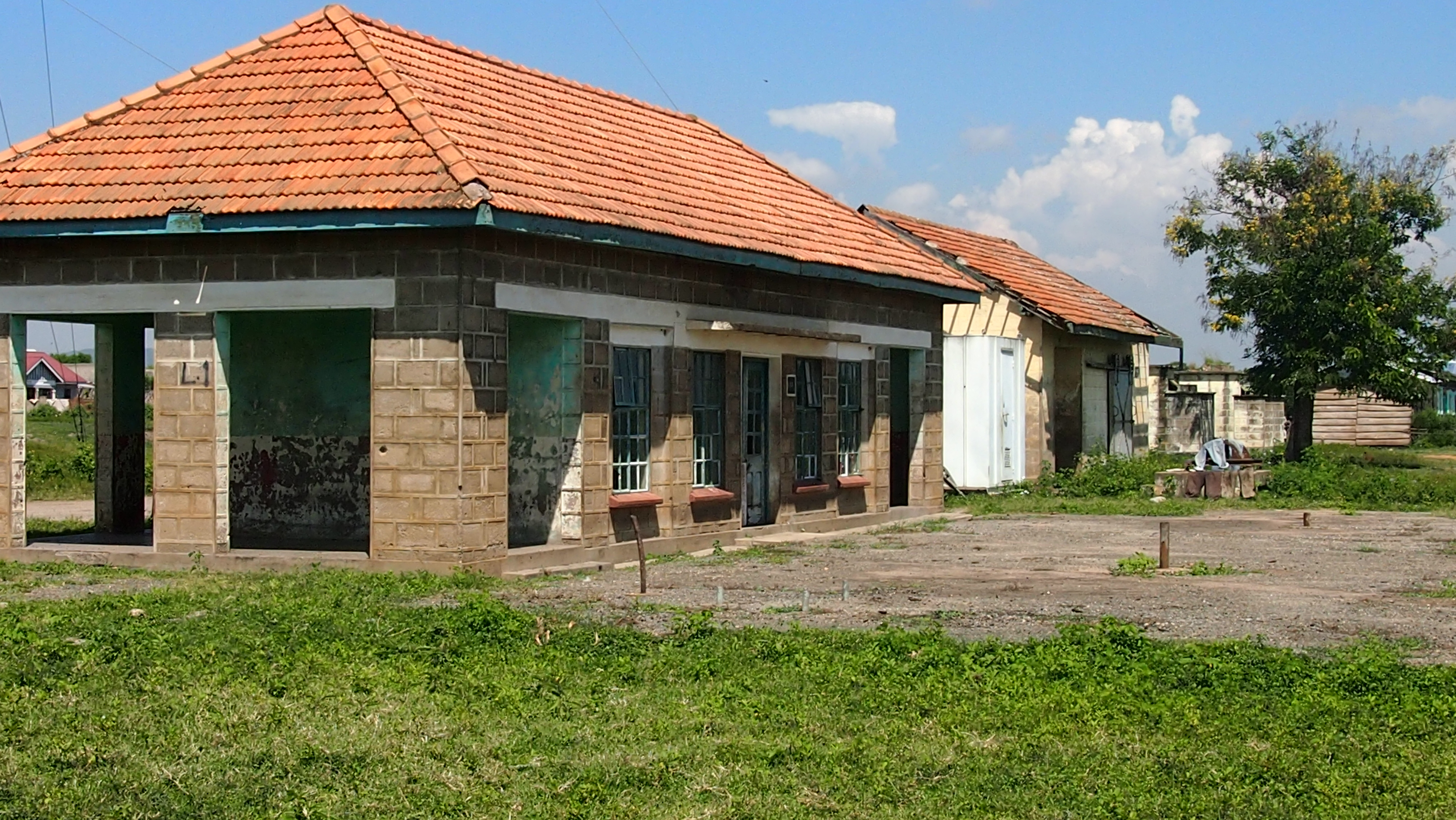
Old Kasese Train Station

- Bungoma - last town in Kenya
- Malaba, Kenya
  - (Kenya) (Uganda) (border)
- Malaba, Uganda
- (Uganda) Tororo - near Kenya border; junction for north line
- Main Line
- Iganga
- Jinja - bridge over Victoria Nile; copper smelter
- Iganga - washed away culvert (2008)
- Busembatia
- Kampala - national capital
- Kamwenge
- Kasese - railhead in southwest; cement works; copper mine

- Branch line from Kampala
- Port Bell - port on Lake Victoria

- North Line
- (Uganda) Tororo - junction
- Mbale
- Kumi
- Aloi
- Soroti
- Lira
- Gulu, Lira and Gulu.
- Pakwach - port in north west on Albert Nile
- Arua - railway does/used to extend to here.
- border Uganda South Sudan
- (South Sudan) Juba - national capital
- missing link (ferry)

(South Sudan) Wau

- Nalukolongo - workshops
- Kilembe - copper mine

=== Proposed ===
(connection to South Sudan - South to North)

- (Kenya) Lamu - port
- (Kenya) Garissa - river town
- Tororo, Uganda
- (Uganda) Malaba - junction
- (Uganda) Pakwach - river port on White Nile
- (Uganda) Gulu

- (Uganda) Kampala - capital
- (Uganda) Malaba - junction
  - (Uganda) Nimule, South Sudan - border
  - (South Sudan) Juba - national capital
  - (South Sudan) Waw - river port on Jur River - break of gauge with Sudan

- Westwards from Kasese to (Democratic Republic of the Congo) Kisangani in the Democratic Republic of Congo;
- Northwards from Gulu to Nimule, continuing to Juba in South Sudan;
- North-eastwards from Pakwach to (South Sudan) Juba in the Sudan, continuing to Wau;
- Southwards from Masaka to Biharamulo in Tanzania.

____

- (Uganda) Hoima - proposed oil refinery

=== Standard gauge ===
==== 2017 ====
- Kenya
- Naivasha
- Narok
- Bomet
- Nyamira
- Kisumu
- Yala
- Mumias
- Malaba
- Kenya Uganda border.
- Tororo
- Butaleja
- Namutumba
- Iganga
- Luuka
- Mayuge
- Jinja
- Buikwe
- Mukono
- Wakiso
- Kampala districts.

Uganda

==== 2015 ====
- SG construction starts

==== 2014 ====
- CRBC Deal

- original proposal including train ferry across Lake Victoria
- Tanga, Tanzania - Ocean port
- (Uganda) Musoma - Lake Victoria port

- revised proposal avoiding train ferry across Lake Victoria
- Tanga, Tanzania - Singida - Mutukula - Kampala

- Hub

=== Out of service ===
- Busoga

== See also ==
- Railway stations in Sudan
- Railway stations in Kenya
- Transport in Uganda
- Lamu Port and Lamu-Southern Sudan-Ethiopia Transport Corridor
