= Lumino (disambiguation) =

Lumino may refer to:

- Lumino, Switzerland in south-eastern Switzerland
- Lumino, Uganda in Busia District, Uganda
- Lumino (band), a hip-hop group based in Mongolia
