= Wairaka =

Wairaka may refer to:

- Wairaka (Mātaatua)
- Wairaka, Uganda
- Wairaka Rock
