= Uganda Export Promotion Board =

Coordinates: 00°19′34.5″N 32°34′37.5″E

- UEPB

Agency overview
- Formed: 1996
- Jurisdiction: Uganda
- Headquarters: 2nd Floor, UEDCL Tower 37 Nakasero Road Kampala, Uganda
- Agency executive: Elly Twineyo Kamugisha, Executive Director
- Parent agency: Uganda Ministry of Trade, Industry and Cooperatives
- Website: Homepage

Uganda Export Promotion Board (UEPB) was a public trade promotion organization established by Parliamentary Statute No. 2 of 1996. At the time of formation, it was known as the Uganda Export Promotion Council (UEPC). It is an agency that is regulated and supervised by the Uganda Ministry of Trade, Industry and Cooperatives. The fundamental role of this institution is to facilitate the development and growth of export trade in Uganda.

== Location ==
Right up to the time of the merger with Free Zones Authority in 2024, UEPB maintained its headquarters and only office at: 2nd Floor, UEDCL Tower, 37 Nakasero Road, Kampala, Uganda. The geographical coordinates of Uganda Export Promotion Board headquarters are:0°19'34.5"N, 32°34'37.5"E (Latitude:0.326250; Longitude:32.577083).

== Administration ==
This institution was administered by a board of directors that drawn from government ministries, related public and private trade support institutions and major export sector associations. These include the Ministry of Finance, Ministry of Trade, Industry and Cooperatives, Ministry of Foreign Affairs; Uganda Investment Authority (UIA), Uganda National Chamber of Commerce and Industry (UNCCI); Uganda National Farmers Federation, Uganda Flower Exporter Association plus other private sector players. In total there are 12 members.

== Operations ==
The institution was technically headed by an executive director. It is organized into three operational divisions: (a) Market Research and Product Development, (b)Management Information Systems, Trade Promotions and Public Relations and (3) the Finance and Administration Division. Each of these three divisions is headed by a divisional director and has at least three desk officers.

== President's Export Award ==
The UEPB had an annual event; the "President's Export Award", which acknowledged the export fraternity's contribution towards the economic development of the country. The President was always the chief host and guest at this annual event.

== See also ==
- Uganda Investment Authority
- Parliament of Uganda
