= Wairaka, Uganda =

Ugandan settlement

Wairaka
- Map of Uganda showing the location of Wairaka.
- Coordinates: 00°28′29″N 33°15′52″E
- Country: Uganda
- Region: Eastern Region
- District: Jinja District
- Elevation: 1,132 m (3,714 ft)
- Time zone: UTC+3 (EAT)

Wairaka is a settlement in the Eastern Region of Uganda.

== Location ==
Wairaka is located in Kakira Sub-county, Jinja District, approximately 15 kilometres (9 mi), by road, east of the city of Jinja, where the district headquarters are located. This is approximately 94 kilometres (58 mi), by road, east of Kampala, the capital of Uganda and the largest city in that country. The geographical coordinates of Wairaka, Uganda are 0°28'29.0"N, 33°15'52.0"E (Latitude:0.474722; Longitude:33.264444). Wairaka's average elevation is 1,132 metres (3,714 ft) above sea level.

== Overview ==
Wairaka lies along the Jinja–Iganga–Bugiri–Tororo Road (A109 Road), immediately south-west of the town of Kakira, the headquarters of the Madhvani Group of companies. Neighboring locations include Bugembe and Magamaga.

The neighborhood is primarily low-income with the major income-generating activities being micro-businesses, subsistence farming, and animal grazing.

Available schools include Wairaka Primary School, and Muljibhai Madhvani Wairaka College (also Wairaka College), a residential, mixed middle and high school (grades 8 to 13).

== Wairaka College ==
Muljibhai Madhvani College Wairaka, commonly known as Wairaka College, is located here. One of its prominent alumni is long-distance runner, Joshua Kiprui Cheptegei, the silver medalist in the 10,000 meters run at the World Championship in London, in 2017. He also holds the 15 kilometer road race world record set in 2018, and the world record for 5 kilometers, that he set in Monaco in 2020.

Cheptegei attended Wairaka College on a full sports scholarship from 2011 until 2012, while he pursued his A-Level studies. In 2017, the College's Alumni Association awarded him the Pillar Honour, which is the highest award the association can give to its members. This was in recognition of his achievements in the field of sports.

== See also ==
- Musita
- Buwenge
