= Mayuge =

- Location in Uganda
- Coordinates: 00°27′28″N 33°28′48″E
- Country: Uganda
- Region: Eastern Region of Uganda
- Sub-region: Busoga sub-region
- District: Mayuge District
- Elevation: 3,799 ft (1,158 m)

Population (2014 Census)
  - Total: 17,151

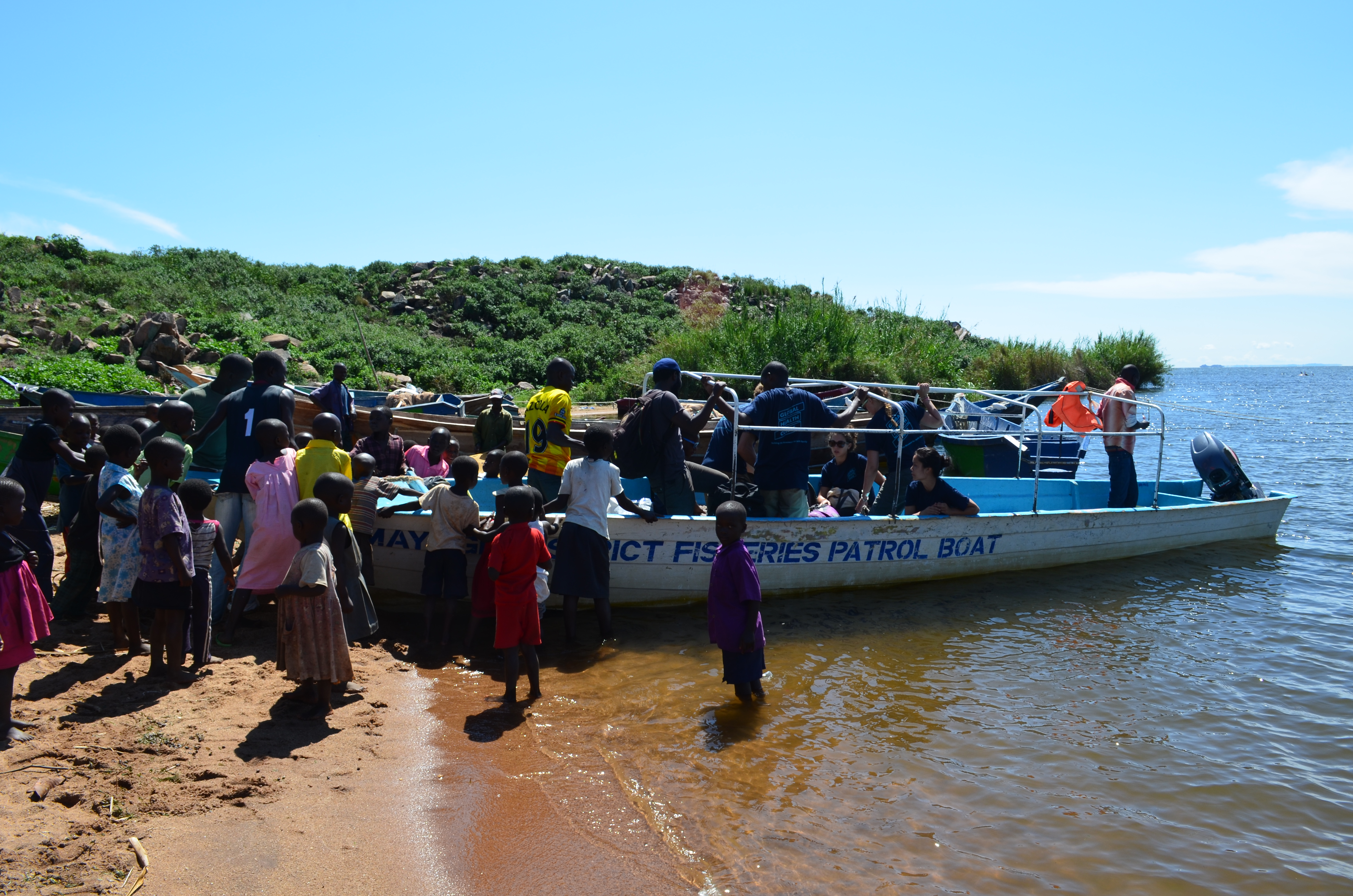
Transportation near the shores of lake Victoria in Mayuge district

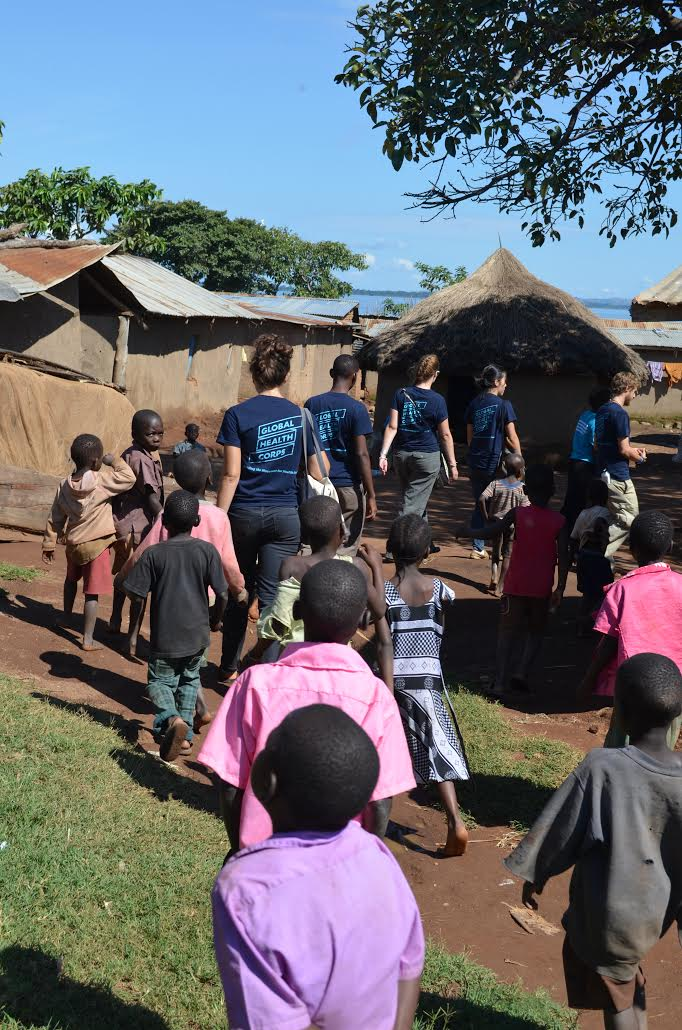
Common infrastructure in Mayuge district near the shores of Lake Victoria

Mayuge is a town in the Eastern Region of Uganda. It is the location of the headquarters of Mayuge District.

== Location ==
Mayuge is located on the Musita–Mayuge–Lumino–Majanji–Busia Road, about 14 kilometres (9 mi) southeast of Musita. This is about 28 kilometres (17 mi) south of Iganga, the nearest large town.

Mayuge lies approximately 38 kilometres (24 mi), east of Jinja, the largest city in Busoga sub-region. Neighboring communities include Bugade, Bwondha, Bugoto, Buwaya, Busakira, Kigandalo, Musita, and Mbaale. The geographical coordinates of Mayuge are 0°27'28.0"N, 33°28'48.0"E (Latitude:0.457782; Longitude:33.480003). Mayuge Municipality lies at an average elevation of 1,158 metres (3,799 ft) above mean sea level.

== Overview ==
Mayuge is a small rural settlement that is in the process of becoming an urban center. Mayuge is the only municipality in Mayuge District. Sanitation was one of the major challenges that the town faced in 2010.

== Population ==
In 2002, the national census estimated Mayuge's population at about 8,720. In 2010, the Uganda Bureau of Statistics (UBOS) estimated the population at 11,500. In 2011, UBOS estimated the population at 11,900. On 27 August 2014, the national population census put the population at 17,151.

== Economic activity ==
The economic activity in the town revolves mainly around subsistence agriculture, poultry farming, and animal husbandry.

== Energy ==
Mayuge is the location of Mayuge Solar Power Station, a 10 megawatts solar PV installation that supplies power to the Uganda electricity national grid. The solar farm was commissioned in June 2019.

== See also ==
- Busoga sub-region
- List of cities and towns in Uganda
