= Aisha Sematiko =

Uganda Journalist

- Born: Hajati Aisha Sematiko Sematikoda; Jigjiga
- Died: 19 June 2010
- Citizenship: Somali
- Occupations: Journalist; news anchor
- Employers: CBS radio; Dembe FM
- Awards: The best news anchor of year; 1st runner up of the best radio news reader

Aisha Sematiko popularly known as Hajati Aisha Sematiko (died 19 June 2010) was the veteran news anchor at CBS radio. She was also the first Ugandan lady to read Luganda News on Radio which helped her to encourage many women to join the field. She was regularly announced as the best news anchor of year. Amelia Kyambadde was pleased and recognised Hajati Aisha Sematiko as one of the famous people in State House that she was pleased to be among. In 2003, she was voted the 1st runner up of the best radio news reader of Dembe FM with 385 votes after Kaddu Mukasa of CBS who won with 460 votes.

== Career ==
She was mentored by Bbale Francis on TV and also mentored on radio by Eva Kabali Kaggwa formally on radio Uganda. Her two sons who did Mass Communication; Nasser worked with Radio Simba as a reporter while Hassan with Straight Talk radio section.

== See also ==
- Rachel Kabejja
- Patricko Mujuuka
- Sheila Nnvannungi
- Alex Ndawula
