= Busitema Forest =

Forest reserve in Uganda

Busitema Forest Reserve
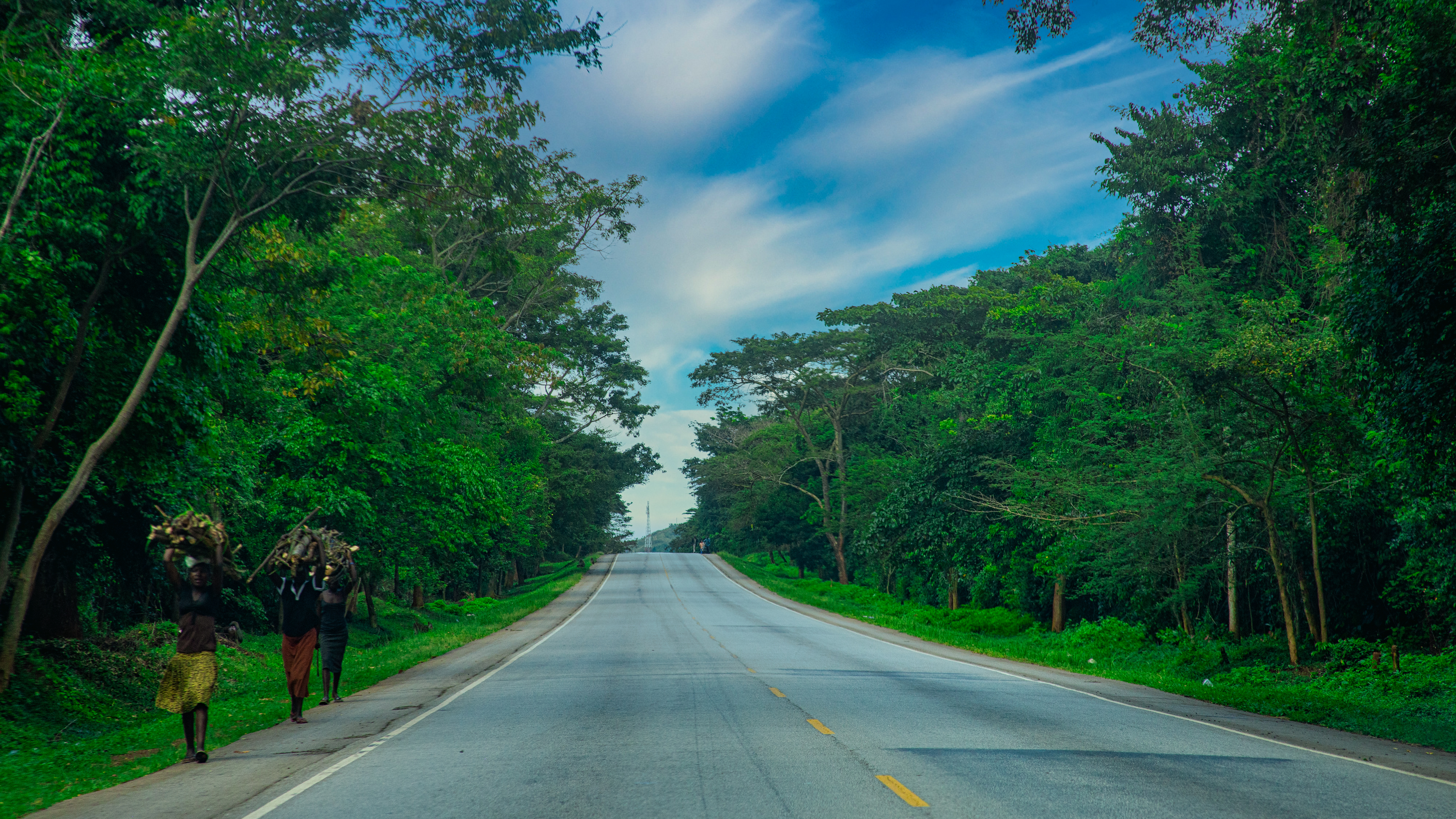
- View of Busitema Forest Reserve along Jinja-Tororo Highway

- Location within Uganda
- Interactive map of Busitema Forest Reserve

Geography
- Location: Eastern Uganda
- Coordinates: 0°32′15″N 33°59′33″E
- Area: 25 km^{2} (9.7 sq mi)

Administration
- Governing body: National Forestry Authority (NFA)

Busitema Forest Reserve is forest reserve located in eastern Uganda, covering parts of the Busia, Tororo, and Bugiri districts. The forest can be accessed via the Tororo-Busia road, near Busitema University which makes it easy for visitors to reach this natural attraction. It spans approximately 25 square kilometers, providing a haven a diverse ecosystem.

== Ecological significance ==
Busitema Forest is a haven to variety of flora and fauna hence playing a crucial role in the local ecology by serving as a carbon sink and supporting biodiversity in the region. It is particularly noted for its population of primates, including olive baboons, vervet monkeys, and black-and-white colobus monkey. The forest also hosts several bird species, such as Ross's turaco, kingfishers, and sunbirds, making it a popular destination for bird watchers.

== Conservation efforts ==
Efforts to conserve the reserve include reforestation programs and community engagement initiatives. The National Forestry Authority (NFA) and other organizations work to protect the forest from illegal activities such as logging and charcoal burning, which have been significant threats due to local poverty and the high demand for land and resources.

== Socio-economic importance ==
The forest provides vital resources to the surrounding communities, including firewood, medicinal plants, and fruits. It also offers eco-tourism opportunities, which can generate income for local residents. However, the forest faces challenges from encroachment and deforestation driven by population pressure and poverty.

== Activities ==
Guided walks through the forest allow visitors to explore its biodiversity, including primates and endemic species like the fox's weaver. The forest is a haven for bird enthusiasts, offering sightings of various bird species. Olive baboons and monkeys are a significant attraction, often seen along the highway and within the forest during guided tours.
