= Sanjay Tanna =

Ugandan businessman and politician

Hon. Sanjay Tanna

Minister of Trade, Industry and Cooperatives
- In office June 2026 – Incumbent
- President: Yoweri Museveni
- Preceded by: Francis Mwebesa

Member of Parliament for Tororo Municipality
- In office 2006–2016

Personal details
- Born: Sanjay Tanna; April 27, 1973 (age 53) Uganda
- Citizenship: Uganda
- Relatives: Jayprakash ("Jay") Tanna (brother)
- Education: Kitante Primary School, Makerere College School
- Occupation: Businessman, politician
- Profession: Business executive
- Known for: Business, politics

Sanjay Tanna (born 27 April 1973) is a Ugandan businessman and politician serving as the Minister of Trade, Industry and Cooperatives in the 12th Parliament of Uganda since June 2026. He previously represented Tororo Municipality in the Parliament of Uganda from 2006 to 2016.

== Early life and education ==
Sanjay was born in Uganda on 27 April 1973 into a family involved in commerce. He attended Kitante Primary School for his primary education and Makerere College School for his secondary school education.

== Business career ==
Following the death of his elder brother, Jayprakash ("Jay") Tanna, in 2003, he assumed a managerial role of the family's business interests, which include trading, manufacturing, agro-processing and real estate. The family business delt in groceries and household goods but Sanjay expanded into fuel distribution, manufacturing, agriculture, logistics, hospitality, telecommunications and regional trade.

== Political career ==
Sanjay was elected Member of Parliament for Tororo Municipality in the 2006 Ugandan general election. He was re-elected in 2011 and served until 2016.

In May 2026, President Yoweri Museveni appointed Sanjay as Minister of Trade, Industry and Cooperatives. Following parliamentary approval, he assumed office in June 2026, succeeding Francis Mwebesa. His appointment attracted public attention because he became the first Ugandan of Asian descent to hold a substantive Cabinet position since 1967.

As Minister, Tanna has stated that his priorities include industrialisation, export promotion, value addition and strengthening Uganda's cooperative movement.

== Controversies ==
During his parliamentary vetting in 2026, questions were raised regarding his citizenship. Tanna stated that he holds only Ugandan citizenship and does not possess dual nationality.

== See also ==
- Francis Mwebesa
- Parliament of Uganda
- Cabinet of Uganda
- Ministry of Trade, Industry and Cooperatives
