= Andrew Kaluya =

Ugandan politician

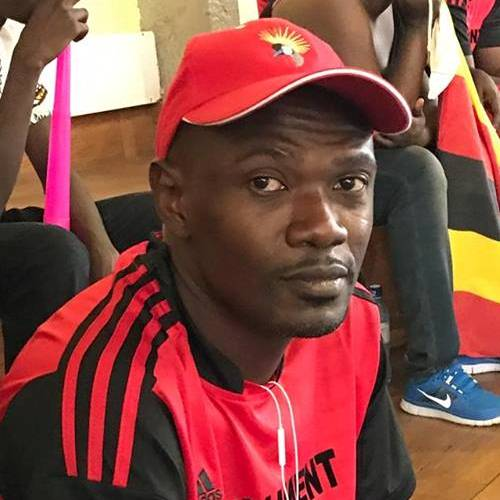
- Andrew Kaluya in 2017

Honorable

Personal details
- Born: Andrew Kaluya; 8 February 1978 (age 48) Iganga, Uganda
- Education: Makerere University (BA in Social Sciences); Kiira College Butiki (UACE)
- Occupation: Social worker, politician
- Known for: Social work, politics

Andrew Kiiza Kaluya Namitego (born 8 February 1978) is a Ugandan social worker, entrepreneur and politician. He is the elected member of parliament for Kigulu County South, Iganga District, and is not affiliated to any political party in Uganda. He is a member of the caucus of independent MPs and serves on the Committee on Agriculture and the Committee on HIV/AIDS & Related Diseases in the 10th Parliament of Uganda.

Kaluya is also the president of SCOPE Foundation, an organisation that labors to provide means through which children of Ugandan prisoners thrive and survive, as per its mission statement.

== Early life and education ==
Kaluya was born in Iganga District, Busoga sub-region, on 8 February 1978 in a Christian family of the Basoga. His father, the late Wilson Kaluya Tidhomu, was a banker and formerly worked as a Chief Cashier for Bank of Uganda and his mother, Martha Nabirye Tidhomu, was a housewife.

He attended Kampala Parents School for his primary education, Nabumali High School for his O-level education and Kiira College Butiki for his A-Level academic qualifications. Consequently, he acquired his PLE certification in 1991, his UCE certification in 1995 and UACE certification in 1998. Kaluya further advanced to Makerere University for his university education where he graduated in 2001 with a Bachelor of Arts in Social Sciences.

While in school, Kaluya served as an Assistant Head of House for Banks House at Nabumali High School, as a Deputy Head of House for Mulondo House at Kiira College Butiki and; as a Member of the Guild Representative Council (GRC) and Minister for Finance at Makerere University.

== Career ==
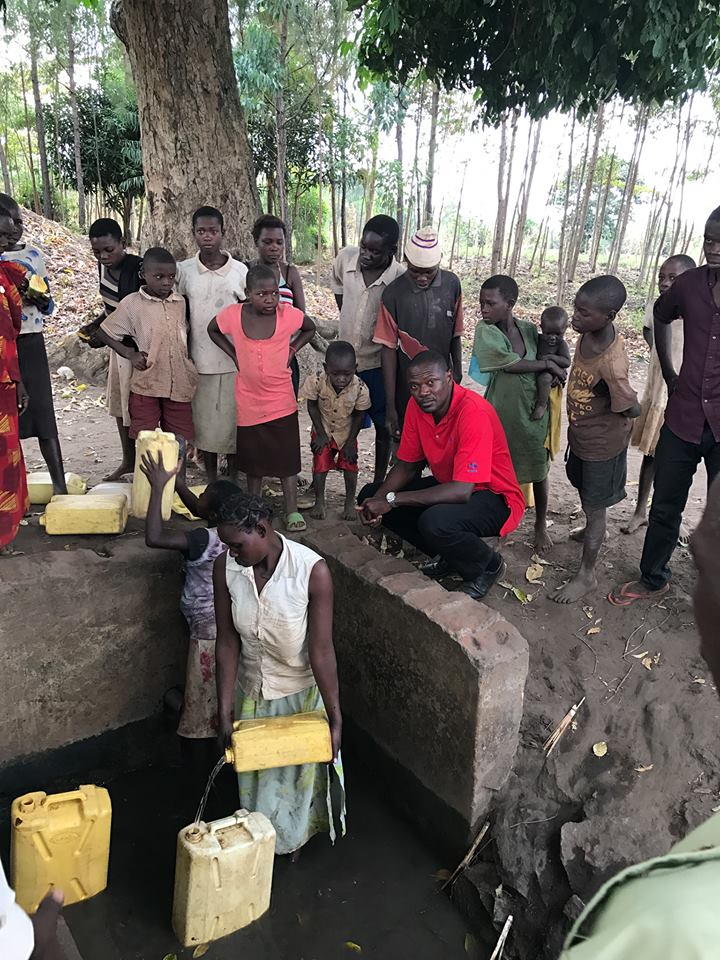
Andrew Kaluya (in red) with some of his constituents in 2017

Having grown up in Iganga, one of the poorest places on earth, Kaluya lived to witness firsthand experience of deprivation and suffering due to poverty. After acquiring his bachelor's degree in 2001, he envisioned a society where children of incarcerated parents and/or primary caregivers have unlimited and undeterred access to protection, provision, development and participation opportunities. As such, he founded SCOPE Foundation and served as the organisation's president, a position he still holds to date.

In 2015, the desire to bring about change in his community forced Kaluya to join elective politics as an independent politician. He went on to win his first election, becoming a member of the 10th Parliament of Uganda representing Kigulu County South, Iganga District. In the 10th Parliament, Kaluya serves as a member of the caucus of independent MPs and serves on the Committee on Agriculture and the Committee on HIV/AIDS & Related Diseases.
