= Majanji =

- Location in Uganda
- Coordinates: 00°14′27″N 33°59′29″E
- Country: Uganda
- Region: Eastern Uganda
- District: Busia District
- Elevation: 3,710 ft (1,130 m)

Population (2014 Census)
  - Total: 11,274

Majanji is a town in the Eastern Region of Uganda.

== Location ==
Majanji is approximately 30 kilometers (19 miles) south of Busia, the nearest large town and the location of the district headquarters. It is also approximately 191 kilometers (119 miles) east of Kampala, the capital of Uganda and its largest city. The coordinates of the town are 0°14'27.0"N, 33°59'29.0"E (Latitude:0.240841; Longitude:33.991387).

== Overview ==
Majanji sits on the northeastern corner of Lake Victoria in Uganda, very close to the international border with Kenya. The principal activity in the town is fishing, although the weekly catch has declined due to overfishing. Iglo Foods Fish Factory, a local fish processor, now produces only 10 tonnes of fish every week, compared to 40,000 tonnes they processed daily when they first opened in the early 2000s.

== Population ==
The national census in August 2014 recorded the population of Majanji sub-county at 11,274.

== Points of interest ==
The following points of interest lie within the town limits or close to the edges of the town:

- The southern end of the Musita–Mayuge–Lumino–Majanji–Busia Road
- Offices of Majanji Town Council
- Majanji Central Market
- Sangalo Sand Beach
- Victoria Coconut Beach Hotel (accommodation, camping, food and drinks, fishing and boat sailing and many more).

== See also ==
- List of cities and towns in Uganda
- List of roads in Uganda
