= Iganga General Hospital =

- Uganda Ministry of Health
- Location within Uganda

Geography
- Location: Iganga, Iganga District, Uganda
- Coordinates: 00°36′57″N 33°29′04″E

Organisation
- Care system: Public
- Type: General

Services
- Emergency department: I
- Beds: 100

History
- Founded: 1968

Links
- Other links: Hospitals in Uganda

Iganga General Hospital, also, Iganga District Hospital or Iganga Main Hospital, Iganga Hospital commonly known as Nakavule Hospital, is a hospital in Iganga, Eastern Uganda.

== Location ==
The hospital is located on the Jinja-Tororo Highway, about 40 kilometres (25 mi), northeast of Jinja Regional Referral Hospital. The coordinates of Iganga General Hospital are: 0°36'57.0"N, 33°29'04.0"E (Latitude:0.615828; Longitude:33.484431).

== Overview ==
Iganga General Hospital is a 100-bed, government-owned hospital. It serves Iganga District and parts of the districts of Luuka, Mayuge, Bugiri, Namutumba and Kaliro. It was built in 1968. Over the years, the underfunded, understaffed hospital's infrastructure has deteriorated and equipment has aged and become antiquated. The overworked staff are underpaid and of low morale.

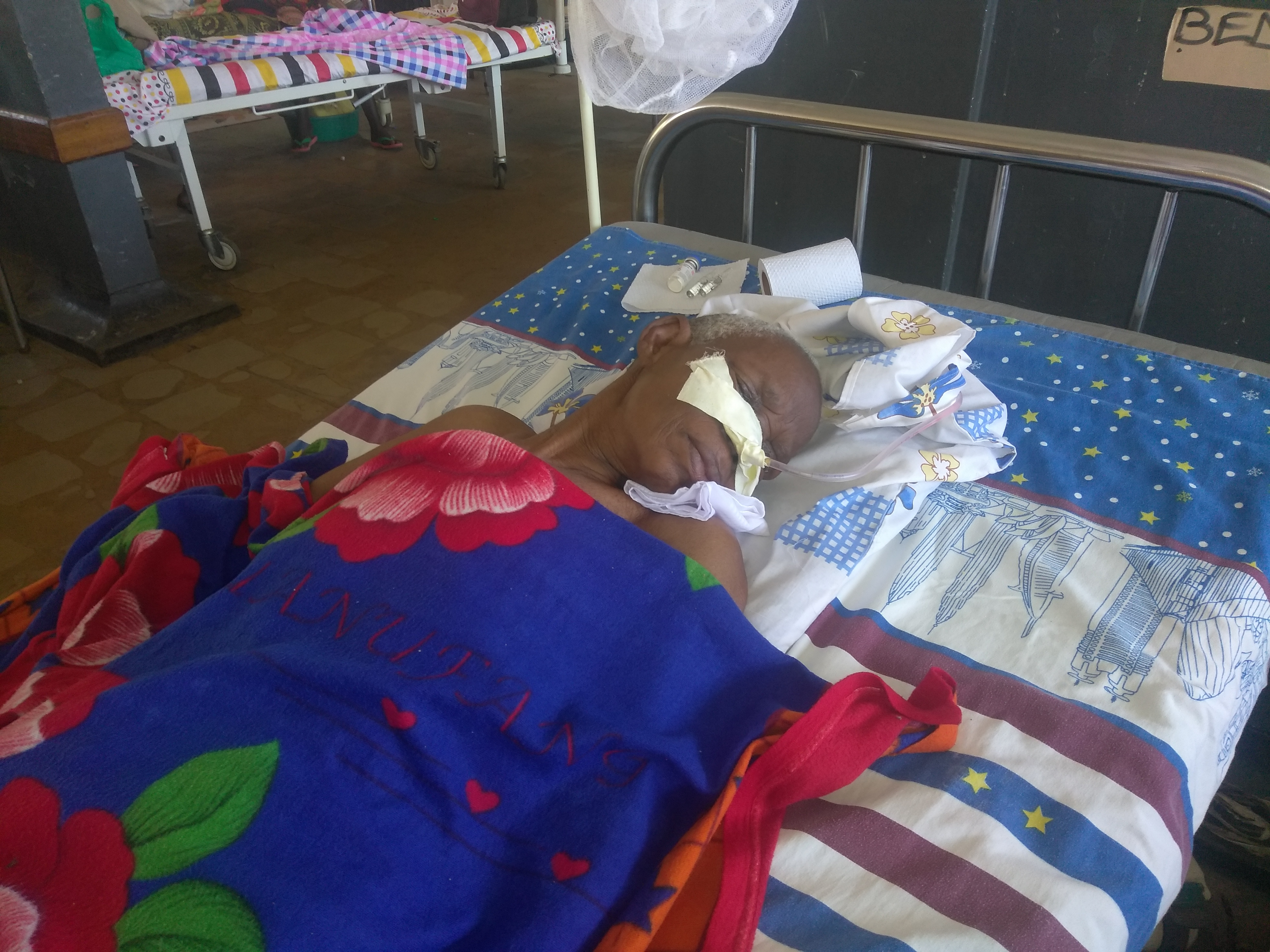
An old person lying on a bed in Iganga hospital in Uganda

== Renovations ==
In 2013 the Uganda Ministry of Health, using a loan of $195 million from the World Bank, began renovating a number of hospitals including this hospital. The renovation work was complete by November 2015.

== See also ==
- List of hospitals in Uganda
