= Bugiri =

Ugandan town

- Location in Uganda
- Coordinates: 00°34′10″N 33°44′55″E
- Country: Uganda
- Region: Eastern Uganda
- Sub-region: Busoga sub-region
- District: Bugiri District
- Elevation: 3,540 ft (1,080 m)

Population (2024 Census)
  - Total: 31,819

Bugiri is a town in the Eastern Region of Uganda. It is the chief town of Bugiri District, and the district headquarters are located there. The town was elevated to Municipal Council status in 2019.

== Location ==
Bugiri is located approximately 72 kilometres (45 mi), by road, east of Jinja, the largest city in Busoga sub-region, along the Jinja–Iganga–Bugiri–Tororo Road. This is approximately 106 kilometres (66 mi), by road, southwest of Mbale, the largest city in the Eastern Region of Uganda. The coordinates of the town are:0°34'10.0"N, 33°44'55.0"E (Latitude:0.569450; Longitude:33.748600).

== Overview ==
Lying on the main highway between Kampala and the border towns of Malaba and Busia, Bugiri experiences a lot of automotive traffic carrying passengers and goods wholly within Uganda and to Rwanda, Burundi, and parts of the Democratic Republic of the Congo.

The town is also known as a home of rice growing and processing company Tilda Uganda and its booming sex-trade, particularly in its suburb of Naluwerere.

== Population ==
The 2002 national census estimated the population of the town at 17,050. In 2010, the Uganda Bureau of Statistics (UBOS) estimated the population at 24,800. In 2011, UBOS estimated the mid-year population at 25,900. In 2014, the national population census put the population at 29,013.

In 2020, UBOS estimated the mid-year population of Bugiri at 36,000 people. The agency calculated the estimated population growth rate in the town to average 3.92 percent annually, between 2014 and 2020.

Historical population
Year	Pop.	±%
2002	17,050	—
2010	24,800	+45.5%
2011	25,900	+4.4%
2014	29,013	+12.0%
2020	36,000	+24.1%

== Points of interest ==
The following points of interest lie within the town limits or near its borders:

- A branch of Posta Uganda
- The headquarters of Bugiri District Administration
- The offices of Bugiri Town Council
- Bugiri General Hospital, a 100-bed public hospital administered by the Uganda Ministry of Health
- Bugiri central market
- Jinja-Malaba Road, passes through the town in a general west to east direction.

== See also ==
- List of cities and towns in Uganda
