= Jane Nabulindo Kwoba =

Ugandan politician

District Woman Representative for Busia District
- In office 2016–2021

Personal details
- Born: June 3, 1976 (age 49) Uganda
- Party: Independent
- Education: Diploma in Education, National Teachers College Nagongera (1997); Bachelor of Arts in Education, Kyambogo University
- Alma mater: Elgon View Primary School; Masaba College; Makerere High School Greg Centre; National Teachers College Nagonger; Kyambogo University
- Occupation: Teacher, Politician
- Known for: Independent MP defeating Barbara Nekesa Oundo (2016); Member, Committee on HIV/AIDS and Related Diseases; Member, Uganda Women Parliamentary Association (UWOPA); Advocacy for fair compensation for communities affected by the proposed gold refinery project

Jane Nabulindo Kwoba (born 3 June 1976) is a Ugandan politician, teacher by profession and legislator. She represents the people of Busia District as district Woman representative in the parliament of Uganda. She is an independent member of parliament, she entered parliament after defeating former minister for karamoja affairs and National Resistance Movement member Barbara Nekesa Oundo who is currently serving as ambassador to south Africa. She lost to Hellen Auma Wandera in the 2021-2026 Parliamentary Elections.

== Education ==
Jane started her primary education from Elgon view primary school where she sat her primary leaving examinations(PLE) in 1988, She later enrolled at Masaba College for her O'level education where she finished her Uganda Certificate of Education (UCE) in 1991. She later joined Makerere high school Greg centre where she sat her Uganda Advanced Certificate of Education (UACE) in 1995, thereafter joining National teachers college Nagongera where she graduated with a diploma in education in 1997. She later joined Kyambogo University where she graduated with a bachelor's degree of Arts in Education.

== Career ==
Jane served as a health specialist and was charged with sponsor donor relations for Compassion International from 2002 to 2012.

She was an HIV/AIDS counselor for amalgamated transport and general workers union (ATGWU) uganda from 2013 to 2016.

She was also women team leader at Eastern African sub-regional support initiative for the advancement of women – women and girls empowerment (EASSI-WOGE) from 2013 to 2016.

From 2016 to date, Jane Nabulindo Kwoba has been a member of parliament of Uganda(10th parliament). In parliament she serves on the committee on HIV/AIDS and related diseases.

She is a member of professional bodies; Buwembe secondary school board of governors. and the Dorcus ministry.

Jane is also a member of the Uganda Women Parliamentary Association (UWOPA).

She has advocated for fair and reasonable compensation for families in her area that are to be affected by a proposed gold refinery project by the chinese.
