= Aloi =

- Location in Uganda
- Coordinates: 02°15′10″N 33°10′40″E
- Country: Uganda
- Region: Northern Region of Uganda
- Sub-region: Lango sub-region
- District: Lira District
- Elevation: 1,102 m (3,615 ft)

Population (2024)
  - Total: 20,426
- Time zone: UTC+3 (EAT)

Aloi is a town council in Alebtong District in the Northern Region of Uganda, in the Lango sub-region.

== Location ==
Aloi is located in Moroto County, Alebtong District, within the Lango sub-region of Northern Uganda.

== Population ==
The 2024 National Population and Housing Census (NPHC) results reported for Aloi Town Council show a population of 20,426 people (9,193 males and 11,233 females).

For historical context, the 2014 census tables include figures for Aloi (subcounty) under Moroto County, which should not be treated as the same unit as the town council.

Selected census figures reported for administrative units named "Aloi"
Administrative unit	Census year	Population	Source
Aloi Town Council	2024	20,426	UBOS NPHC 2024 (compiled by CityPopulation)
Aloi (Subcounty)	2014	30,659	UBOS NPHC 2014 tables (UNSD repository)

== Transport ==
Aloi is referenced among locations where Uganda Police Force railway policing activities inspected and patrolled railway installations in the Northern Region.

== See also ==
- Railway stations in Uganda
- Alebtong District
- Lango sub-region
