= Francis Mwebesa =

Ugandan politician

Hon. Francis Mwebesa

Minister of Trade, Industry and Cooperatives
- In office 2021–2026
- President: Yoweri Museveni
- Succeeded by: Sanjay Tanna

Personal details
- Born: Francis Mwebesa Uganda
- Education: Ntare School, University of Nairobi (Bachelor of Commerce)
- Occupation: Politician, businessman
- Known for: Trade and industrial policy
- Nickname: Frank

Francis (Frank) Mwebesa is a Ugandan politician who serves as Minister of Trade, Industry and Cooperatives in the Cabinet of Uganda.

== Education background ==
Mwebesa holds a Bachelor of Commerce Degree from Nairobi University. He attended Ntare school for his secondary school studies. He is an Anglican and member of the Church of Uganda.

== Career ==
Mwebesa worked with Dunlop East Africa in 1970. From Dunlop he joined East African Steel Corporation where he served as the General Manager until 1980.

He also worked with Uganda Civil Aviation Authority and Centenary Bank in Uganda as Board member.

Mwebesa also served as Senior Presidential Advisor and was later appointed as Minister of Trade, Industry and Cooperatives since 2021. He is also a businessman and investor.

== See also ==
- Sanjay Tanna
- Cabinet of Uganda
- Politics of Uganda
- Ministry of Trade, Industry and Cooperatives (Uganda)
