= Barbara Nekesa Oundo =

Ugandan politician and diplomat

- Born: Barbara Nekesa; June 6, 1984 (age 42); Busia, Uganda
- Citizenship: Uganda
- Education: Bubulo Girls School in Mbale; Mbogo High School in Kawempe
- Alma mater: Makerere University (Bachelor of Human Resource Management)
- Occupations: Diplomat and Politician
- Years active: 2011 — present
- Known for: politics
- Title: Uganda's High Commissioner to the Republic of South Africa
- Spouses: Charles Mukanga Oundo (m. 2007; div. 2017) Sulaiman Lumolo Mafabi (m. 2018)

Barbara Nekesa Oundo (born 6 June 1984) is a Ugandan politician and diplomat, who serves as Uganda's High Commissioner to South Africa, based in Pretoria. In that capacity, she also represents her country, to the nations of South Africa, Botswana, Namibia, Lesotho and Swaziland.

She previously served as the state minister for Karamoja affairs in the Cabinet of Uganda. She was appointed to that position on 27 May 2011. She replaced Janet Museveni, who then was appointed minister for Karamoja affairs. Oundo served as the elected member of Parliament for Busia District women's representative in the 9th parliament (2011 to 2016).

== Early life and education ==
Oundo was born in Busia District in the Eastern Region on 6 June 1984 to Mary Hadudu, mother to nine other girls and Edward Wabudi, a local councillor. She attended the Bubulo Girls School in Mbale for her middle school education (O-Level) and Mbogo High School in Kawempe for her high school studies (A-Level). In 2009, she graduated from Makerere University in Uganda with a Bachelor of Human Resources Management degree.

== Career ==
In 2011, Barbara successfully ran on the National Resistance Movement (NRM) political party ticket for the parliamentary Busia district women's constituency seat. In May 2011, she was appointed state minister for Karamoja affairs, reporting directly to Janet Museveni, Uganda's first lady and at the time, minister for Karamoja affairs.. In October 2017, Nekesa was appointed Ambassador to South Africa from Uganda, a post she held till 2021 when she was awarded the National Treasurer post.

She is the current appointed National Treasurer of the ruling National Resistance Movement (NRM) Amb.

== Personal life ==
Since 2007, Barbara married Charles Oundo, a foreign service officer, whom she met while an undergraduate at Makerere University. They are the parents of two sons.By the names of Oundo Charles Junior and Egesa Mario Oundo.

In 2017, she divorced her first husband, Charles Oundo. In December 2018, she married Hajji Suleiman Lumolo Mafabi with whom she has 3 daughtersby names of, Ariba Lumolo Mafabi, Naira Lumolo Mafabi Nandudu, Lahna Mafabi Lumolo. Sulaiman is a businessman based in Mbale, in the Eastern Region of Uganda. The private ceremony took place at their home in Muyenga, an upscale neighborhood in Kampala, Uganda's capital city.

== Loss of political positions ==
In November 2015 during the NRM primaries, incumbent Oundo received 28,750 votes while her closest challenger, Nina Irene Nekesa Wandera, received 25,443 votes. Wandera then petitioned the party's electoral commission with alleged evidence of electoral malpractice by Oundo.

During the 2016 parliamentary elections, Oundo lost to incumbent Jane Nabulindo Kwoba, who ran as an independent. In the cabinet list released by the Office of the President on 6 June 2016, Oundo was not included.

== See also ==
- Barbara Oundo Nekesa
- Jane Nabulindo Kwoba

Parliament of Uganda
