= Ministry of Trade, Industry and Cooperatives (Uganda) =

Government ministry of Uganda

Coordinates: 00°18′48″N 32°35′07″E

- Coat of Arms of Uganda

Ministry overview
- Preceding Ministry: Ministry of Trade, Tourism and Industry
- Type: Ministry
- Jurisdiction: Government of Uganda
- Headquarters: Farmers House 6-8 Parliament Avenue Kampala, Uganda
- Ministry executive: Sanjay Tanna, Minister of Trade, Industry and Cooperatives
- Website: www.mtic.go.ug

The Ministry of Trade, Industry and Cooperatives (MTIC) is a cabinet level ministry of the government of Uganda. The mission of the ministry is to "develop and promote a competitive and export-driven private sector through the acceleration of industrial development", with the ultimate objective being the growth of the Ugandan economy. The ministry is headed by Minister Sanjay Tanna, who was appointed by the president.

== Location ==
The headquarters of MTIC are located in Farmers House, at Plot 6-8 Parliamentary Avenue, on Nakasero Hill, in the Central Division of Kampala, Uganda's capital and largest city. The coordinates of MTIC headquarters are 00°18'48.0"N, 32°35'07.0"E (Latitude:0.313327; Longitude:32.585275).

== Overview ==
The ministry is headed by a cabinet level minister, assisted by three ministers of state appointed by the president of Uganda:

- Cabinet Minister of Trade, Industry and Cooperatives - Hon. Sanjay Tanna
- State Minister for Trade - Gen. Wilson Mbasu Mbadi
- State Minister for Cooperatives - Hon. Alero Tom Aza
- State Minister for Industry - Hon. David Bahati

== Departments and units ==
The ministry is organised into seven administrative departments and seven operational units.

The administrative departments are:

- Finance and Administration
- External Trade
- Internal Trade
- Cooperative Development
- Industry and Technology
- Processing and Marketing
- Business Development and Quality Analysis

The operational units are:

- Policy and Planning
- Resource Center and ICT
- Procurement and Disposal
- Internal Audit
- Human Resources
- Accounts
- Legal Services

== Affiliated agencies ==
MTIC collaborates with and overseas the operations of the following semi-autonomous institutions:

- Uganda National Bureau of Standards
- Management Training and Advisory Centre
- Uganda Export Promotion Board
- Uganda Industrial Research Institute
- Uganda Commodity Exchange
- Uganda Development Corporation
- Uganda Warehouse Receipt Authority
- Uganda Cleaner Production
- Textile Development Agency

== List of ministers ==
- Sanjay Tanna (June 1, 2026 - present)
- Francis Mwebesa (8 June 2021 - June 12, 2026)
- Amelia Kyambadde (27 May 2011 - 8 June 2021)
- Kahinda Otafiire (16 February 2009 - 27 May 2011)
- Janat Mukwaya (1 June 2006 - 16 February 2009)
- Daudi Migereko (12 January 2005 - 1 June 2006)
- Edward Rugumayo (2000 - 12 January 2005)

== See also ==
- Cabinet of Uganda
- Government of Uganda
