= Naluwerere =

Naluwere is a parish in Bulidha subcounty of Bukooli North County in Bugiri District of Uganda. At the time of the 2014 census it had 3821 inhabitants.
