= Namayingo District =

- District
- District location in Uganda
- Coordinates: 00°17′N 33°51′E
- Country: Uganda
- Region: Eastern Uganda
- Sub-region: Busoga sub-region
- Capital: Namayingo

Area
  - Land: 532.9 km^{2} (205.8 sq mi)
- Elevation: 1,200 m (3,900 ft)

Population (2012 Estimate)
  - Total: 232,300
  - Density: 435.9/km^{2} (1,129/sq mi)
- Time zone: UTC+3 (EAT)
- Website: www.namayingo.go.ug

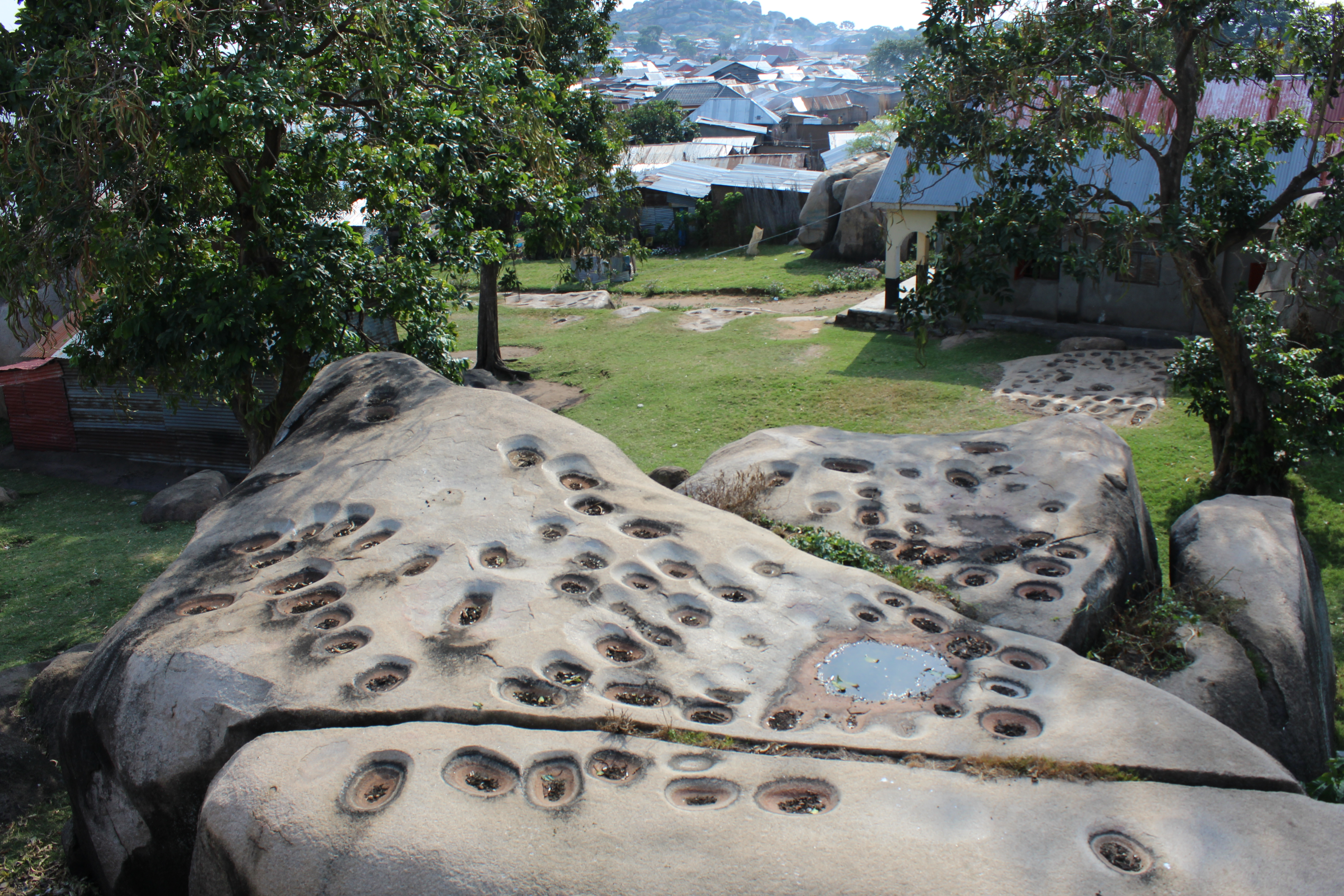
Dolwe Island Rock Art Landscape on Lake Victoria in Namayingo district.

Namayingo District is a district in Eastern Uganda. The district is named after its 'chief town', Namayingo, where the district headquarters are located.

== Administration ==
The district is made up of three county and these county are further divided into 11 sub county and town council. The three counties include the following as below:

Bukooli island county. The county has three sub county which include.

- Bukana. The parishes in this sub county are: Biisa, Buduma, and Bugana.
- Lolwe. This sub county has three parishes Hama, Lolwe east, and Lolwe west.
- Sigulu. the five parishes in this sub county are Bumalenge, Nampongwe, Rubachi, Sigulu manga, and lastly Sigulu mukani.

Bukooli south county. sub county and town council in this county include.

Buswale sub county. this sub county has over six parish that make up Buswale sub county.

- Bubango
- Bungeche
- Buswale
- Nansuma
- Namayuge
- Madowa

Buyinja. the five parish include the following.

1. Gondohera
2. Syanyonja
3. Lwangosia
4. Kifuyo
5. Nsono

Namayingo town council. the ward in this town council are:

- Budidi
- Bulamba
- Namayingo central
- Nasinu
- Nambuyu

Namayingo south county. This county is made up ogf five sub county and town council.

1. Bunda. Buchumba, Bunjanga and Lugala are the three parish in bunda sub county.
2. Bunda town council. this town council has six ward and they include: Bukeda, Buwoya, Bayombo, Lutolo, Magoli and Nanggera.
3. Buhemba. This sub county is made up of five parish namely; Buhemba, Bukewa, Buwongo, Dohwe and Sinde.
4. Mutumba sub county is one of the sub county in namayingo with three parish only and these include: Buchimo, Lubango and Mwema.
5. Mutumba town council. Bulule, Hatumba banja, Lubira, Mawa, Mutumba north and Mutumba south. These are the six ward in mutumba town council.

== Location ==
Namayingo District is located along the Equator. It is bordered by Bugiri District to the northwest, Busia District to the northeast, the Republic of Kenya to the east and southeast, the Republic of Tanzania to the south and Mayuge District to the west and southwest. Namayingo, where the district headquarters are located, is approximately 95 kilometres (59 mi), by road, southeast of Jinja, the largest city in the Busoga sub-region. This location lies approximately 38 kilometres (24 mi), by road, south of Bugiri, the nearest large town. The coordinates of the district are:00 17N, 33 51E.

== Overview ==
The district was established by an Act of Parliament and began functioning on 1 July 2010. Prior to that it was part of Bugiri District. Namayingo District is part of Busoga sub-region. Other districts in Busoga include: Buyende District, Iganga District, Jinja District, Kaliro District, Kamuli District, Luuka District, Mayuge District, Namutumba District.

Prior to 2000, the two main activities in the district were (a) subsistence agriculture on the mainland and (b) commercial fishing on the lakeshores and on the islands in Lake Victoria. During the 21st century, gold deposits have been discovered in the district. This has attracted many new residents to the area, performing such activities as: miners, washers, grinders, middlemen, buyers as well as salesmen of the hardware used in the artisanal gold mining industry, such as pick axes, shovels, pails, basins, ropes and ladders.

== Population ==
The 1991 national population census estimated the district population at about 68,000. In 2002, the next national census put the population of the district at approximately 175,000. The district annual population growth rate was calculated at 2.9%. It is estimated that the population of Namayingo District was approximately 232,300 in 2012. It is also estimated that the population of Namayingo District was approximately 215443 in 2014. It is estimated that the population of Namayingo District was approximately 266716 in 2024.

== Economic activity ==
- Sugar Canes
- Maize
- Cassava
- Potatoes
- Beans
- Irish Potatoes

== Livestock kept by the population ==
- Cattle
- Goats
- Chicken

== See also ==
- Namayingo
- Lake Victoria
- Kingdom of Busoga
- Districts of Uganda
- Busoga sub-region
- Parliament of Uganda
- Eastern Region, Uganda
- 2011 Ugandan general election
