= Iganga =

Ugandan town

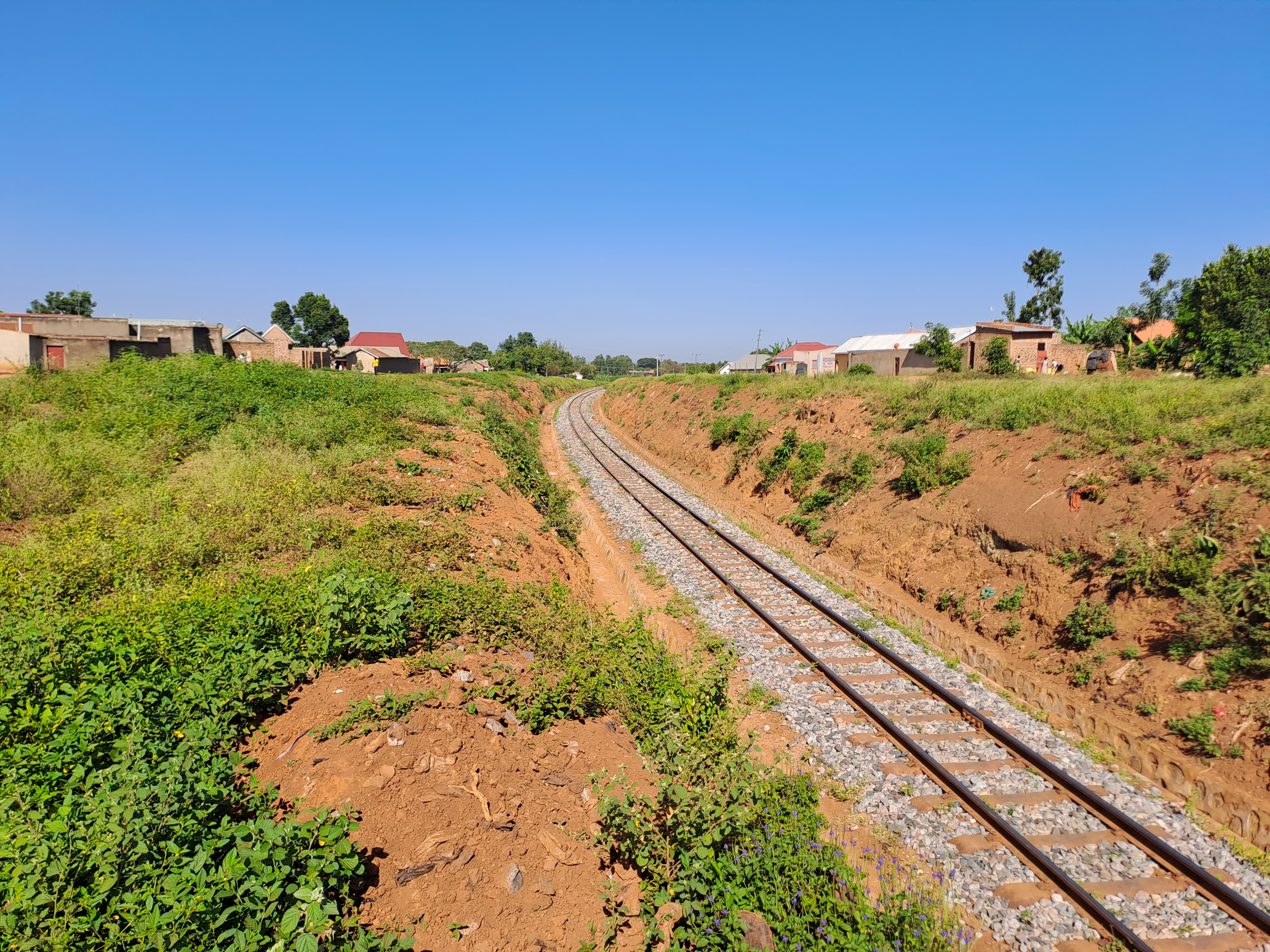

- Location in Uganda
- Coordinates: 00°36′54″N 33°29′06″E
- Country: Uganda
- Region: Eastern Region of Uganda
- Sub-region: Busoga sub-region
- District: Iganga District
- Elevation: 3,670 ft (1,120 m)

Population (2024 Census)
  - Total: 56,381
- Website: igangamc.go.ug

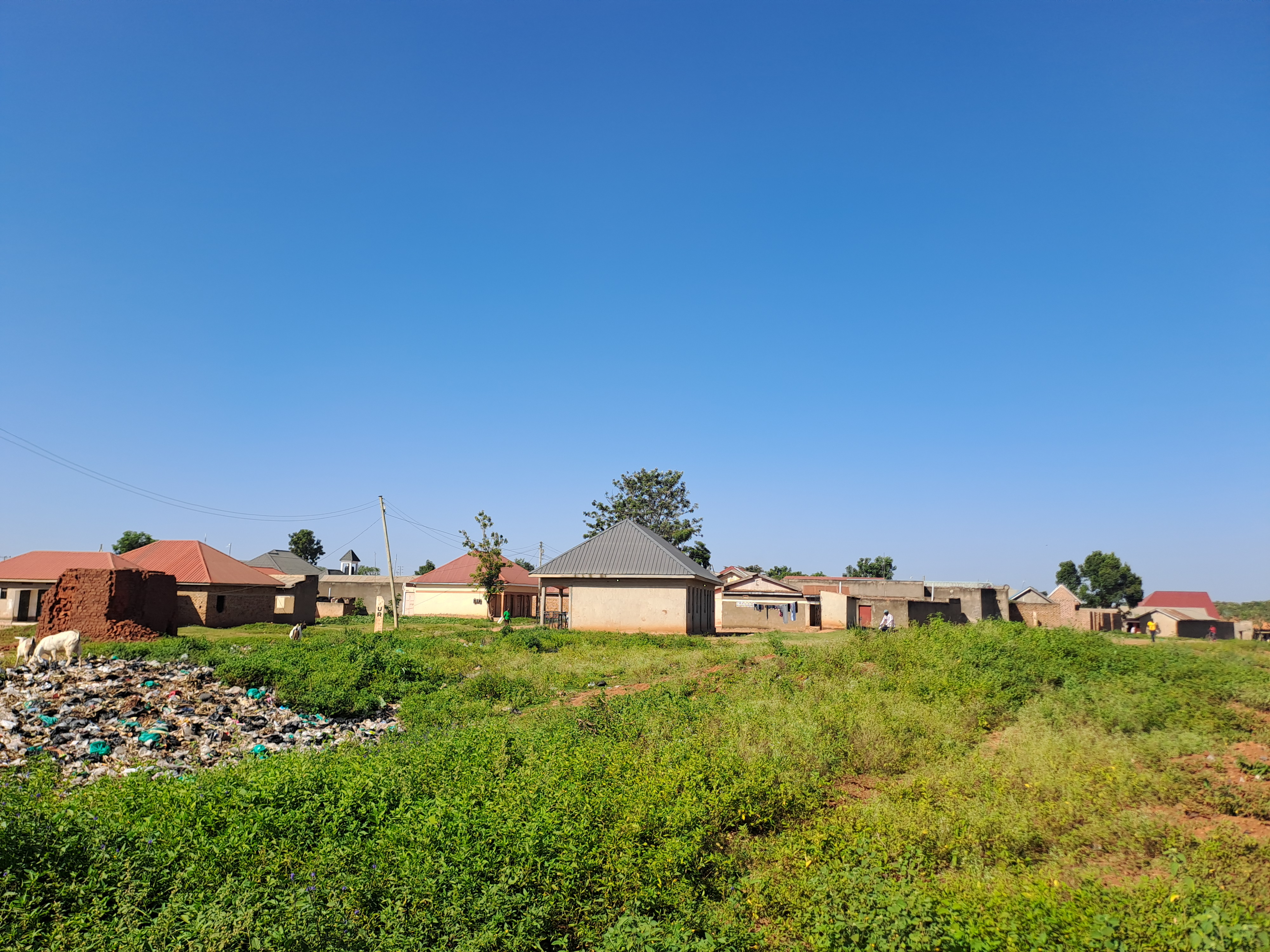
Kongola road Iganga district

Iganga is a town in the Eastern Region of Uganda. It is the main municipal, administrative, and commercial center of Iganga District.

== Location ==
Iganga is located in Uganda's Busoga sub-region. It lies approximately 40 kilometres (25 mi) northeast of the city of Jinja on the highway between Jinja and Tororo.

This is approximately 108 kilometres (67 mi), by road, southwest of Mbale, the largest city in Uganda's Eastern Region. The coordinates of the town of Iganga are:0°36'54.0"N, 33°29'06.0"E (Latitude:0.6150; Longitude:33.4850).

== Overview ==
Points of interest in the town include the DevelopNet Iganga Project, which houses an Internet cafe and a community center for the Iganga District NGO/CBO Forum. International Hand Iganga is a non-governmental organization operating in the area supporting education and community development. Iganga town has several Internet cafes, guest houses, and a bustling market in the center of town adjacent to the taxi park. The town also has religious buildings like churches and mosques.

== Transport ==
Iganga is served by a station on the Uganda Railways. The highway from the city of Jinja passes through Iganga, continuing on to Bugiri and Tororo, as the Jinja–Iganga–Bugiri–Tororo Road. From there it continues to the international border with Kenya at Malaba, approximately 104 kilometres (65 mi) east of Iganga.

== Population ==
In 2002, the national census estimated Iganga's population at 39,500. In 2010, the Uganda Bureau of Statistics (UBOS) estimated the population at 51,800. In 2011, UBOS estimated the mid-year population of Iganga at 53,700. In 2014, the national population census put Iganga's population at 53,870.

In 2015, the population of the town was estimated at 56,500. In 2020, the mid-year population of Iganga Town was projected at 65,500. The population grew at an average annual rate of 3.0 percent, between 2015 and 2020.

Historical population
Year	Pop.	±%
2002	39,500	—
2010	51,800	+31.1%
2011	53,700	+3.7%
2014	53,870	+0.3%
2015	56,500	+4.9%
2020	65,500	+15.9%

== Health ==
Iganga General Hospital also known as Nakavule Hospital, serves the residents of the municipality of Iganga, as well as the rest of the district.

The hospital was rated to be a leading performer of general hospitals in Uganda financially, though its facilities and infrastructure are in need of updates. The hospital was renovated as part of a seven hospital renovation project by the Ugandan government in November 2015.

Efforts have been made to establish emergency medical services in Iganga, most notably with the development of a lay first responder program in 2016 by international collaborators from Washington University in St. Louis, LFR International and the Uganda Red Cross Society.

== Points of interest ==
The following points of interest lie within or near Iganga:

1. Iganga District Administration headquarters

2. Iganga Town Council offices

3. Busoga University, located 1 mile (1.6 km) west of Iganga between Iganga and Jinja

4. Iganga General Hospital, a 120-bed public hospital funded by the Uganda Ministry of Health

5. Iganga Railway Station

6. Iganga central market.

== Notable Person ==
- Andrew Kiiza Kaluya Namitego: He is the elected member of parliament for Kigulu County South, Iganga District.
- Kyeru Phiona Bridget, Model and Former Miss Tourism Uganda

== See also ==
- Sleeping sickness
- List of cities and towns in Uganda
