= Tilda (food manufacturer) =

Food manufacturing company

Coordinates: 51.5015°N 0.1817°E

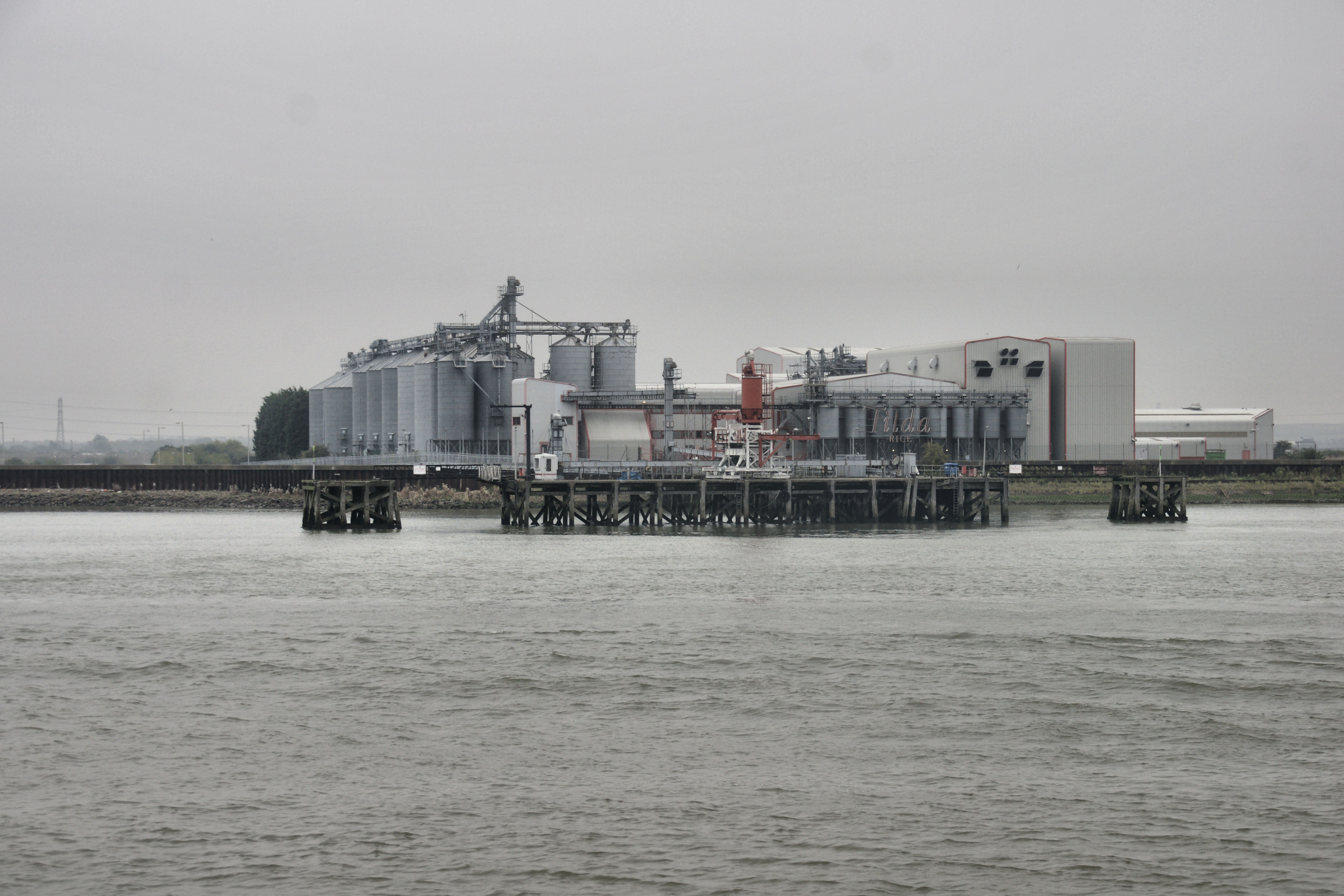
Tilda rice works, Rainham, London

Tilda is a rice and related food products company headquartered in Rainham, England and with offices in Dubai (UAE) and Delhi (India).

Founded by entrepreneur Rashmi Thakrar who fled to the UK during the Expulsion of Asians from Uganda in 1972, its basmati rice is the top-selling rice in the United Kingdom. Starting in 1994, they have operated Tilda Foodservice, providing professional kitchens with a variety of uncooked dry and frozen rice products.

The company was purchased in 2014 by US group Hain Celestial. Hain Celestial Group sold the company to Spanish group Ebro Foods in August 2019.
