= Musita =

- Map of Uganda showing location of Musita
- Coordinates: 00°31′40″N 33°23′05″E
- Country: Uganda
- Region: Eastern Region of Uganda
- Sub-region: Busoga sub-region
- Districts: Mayuge District
- Elevation: 1,195 m (3,921 ft)
- Time zone: UTC+3 (EAT)

Musita is a town in Mayuge District, in the Eastern Region of Uganda.

== Location ==
Musita is in Mulingirire parish, Baitambogwe sub-county. It is approximately 16 kilometres (10 mi), by road, west of Iganga, the nearest large town. This is approximately 25 kilometres (16 mi) northeast of Jinja, the largest city in the Busoga sub-region. Musita is about 107 kilometres (66 mi), by road, east of Kampala, the capital and largest city of Uganda. The coordinates of the Musita are 0°31'40.0"N 33°23'05.0"E (Latitude:0.527778; Longitude:33.384722).

== Overview ==
The 104 kilometres (65 mi) Musita–Mayuge–Lumino–Majanji–Busia Road makes a T-junction with the Jinja–Iganga Road (A-109) in the center of Musita town. The central market in Musita had over 1,500 traders in February 2015.
