= Amelia Kyambadde =

Ugandan politician, philanthropist and businesswoman

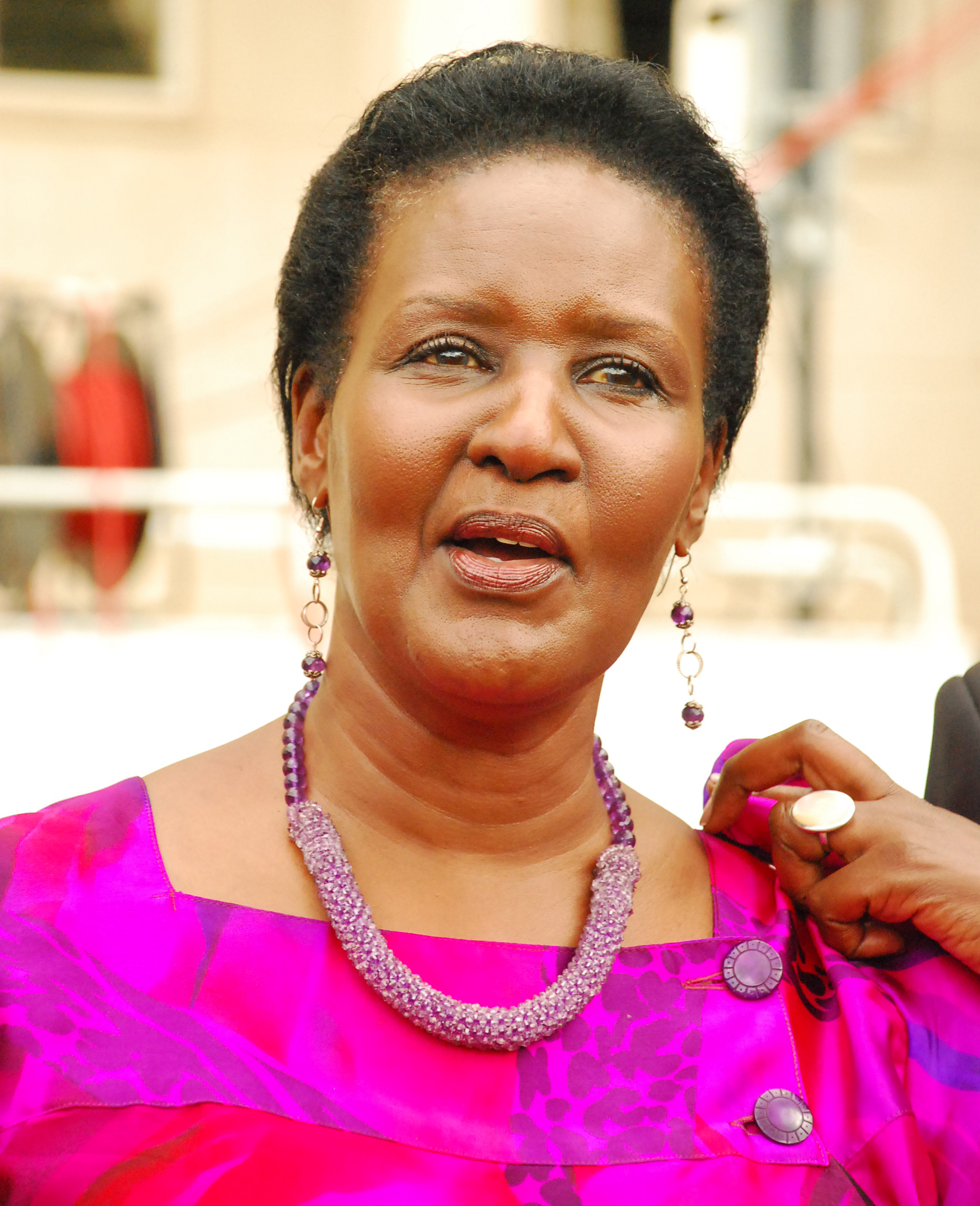
- Kyambadde in 2018
- Born: 30 June 1955 (age 71); Uganda Protectorate
- Citizenship: Uganda
- Education: Makerere University (Bachelor of Business Administration); American InterContinental University (Master of Business Administration)
- Occupations: Administrator, Businesswoman & Politician
- Years active: 1979 — present
- Known for: Politics
- Title: Senior Presidential Advisor on Industry
- Spouse: Wilson Kyambadde

Amelia Anne Kyambadde is a Ugandan politician, philanthropist and Women activist. She is the Member of Parliament for Mawokota North in the 12th Parliament.

She served as the Senior Presidential Advisor on Industry to the President of Uganda, Cabinet Minister of Trade, Industry and Cooperatives in the Ugandan Cabinet from 2016 to 2021. Amelia Kyambade previously represented Mawokota County North in Mpigi District, for two terms in office which ended in the 9th and 10th Parliament.

== Background ==
She was born in June 1955, to the late Serwano K. Kulubya and Mary Kafureka, in Guildford, Surrey, United Kingdom. She relocated to Uganda, in 1959, at the age of four years.

== Education ==
She attended Gayaza Primary School in Wakiso District for elementary education, Gulu Sacred Heart High School in Gulu District for her secondary education and Aga Khan School of Secretarial Studies in Nairobi, Kenya, for her post-secondary education. Amelia Kyambadde holds the degree of Bachelor of Business Administration (BBA), from Makerere University, Uganda's oldest institution of tertiary education, founded in 1922. She also holds the degree of Master of Business Administration (MBA), from the American InterContinental University in London, United Kingdom.

== Work experience ==
She started working in the Ugandan Civil Service in 1979, at the age of twenty-four (24). She rose to the rank of Principal Private Secretary (PPS) of the President of Uganda. In 2010, she voluntarily resigned as the President's PPS, to contest the Parliamentary seat of Mawokota County North, Mpigi District. She served as an MP for Mawokota county North from 2011 to 2016 and 2016 to 2021. She lost in the 2021 MP elections to Kiyaga Hillary Innocent of NUP. On 27 March 2011, she was appointed Minister for Trade & Industry. On 6 June 2016, she was named Cabinet Minister of Trade, Industry and Cooperatives, in the cabinet list released that day, a position she held till June 2021. In June 2021 she was appointed as the Senior Presidential Advisor on Industry to the President of the Republic of Uganda, a position she resigned from to re-contest for MP in Mawokota North in the 2026 General Elections.

== Personal details ==
Amelia Anne Kyambadde has been married to Wilson Kyambadde since 1976. Together, they have six children . She is the Patron of Twezimbe Development Foundation (TDF), a community-based, non-governmental, organization formed to improve the living conditions of the people of her parliamentary constituency. She founded the Twezimbe NGO. Kyambadde is also passionate about women empowerment. She is currently also the CEO of Ensulo Haven, an Eco-tourism destination in Nakyesanja, Mpigi District.

== See also ==
- Cabinet of Uganda
- Parliament of Uganda
- List of members of the tenth Parliament of Uganda
- Barbara Oundo Nekesa
- Jane Nabulindo Kwoba
- Hellen Auma Wandera
