= Malaba, Uganda =

Town in southeastern Uganda

- Location in Uganda
- Coordinates: 00°38′40″N 34°15′38″E
- Country: Uganda
- Region: Eastern Region of Uganda
- District: Tororo District
- Elevation: 3,870 ft (1,180 m)

Population (2020 Estimate)
  - Total: 20,800

Malaba, Uganda is a town in Tororo District in the Eastern Region of Uganda, on its eastern border with Kenya. It sits adjacent from Malaba, Kenya, across the Malaba River that marks the border between Uganda and Kenya.

== Location ==
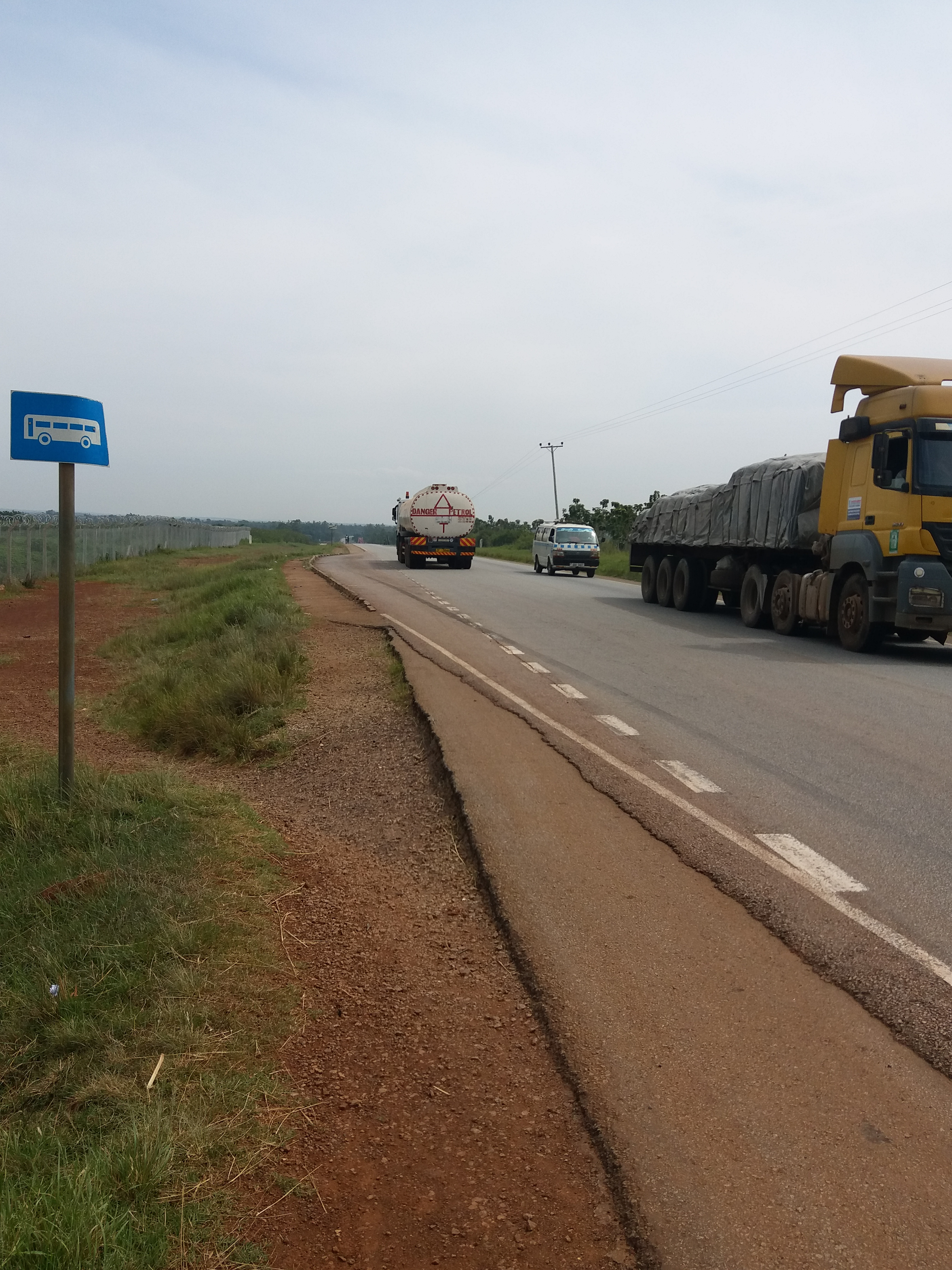
Malaba-Jinja Road

The town is on the main highway between Kampala and Nairobi, about 12 kilometres (7 mi) east of Tororo, the nearest large town and the location of the district headquarters. This is approximately 217 kilometres (135 mi), by road, east of Kampala, Uganda's capital and largest city. The coordinates of the town are 0°38'40.0"N, 34°15'38.0"E (Latitude:0.644444; Longitude:34.260556).

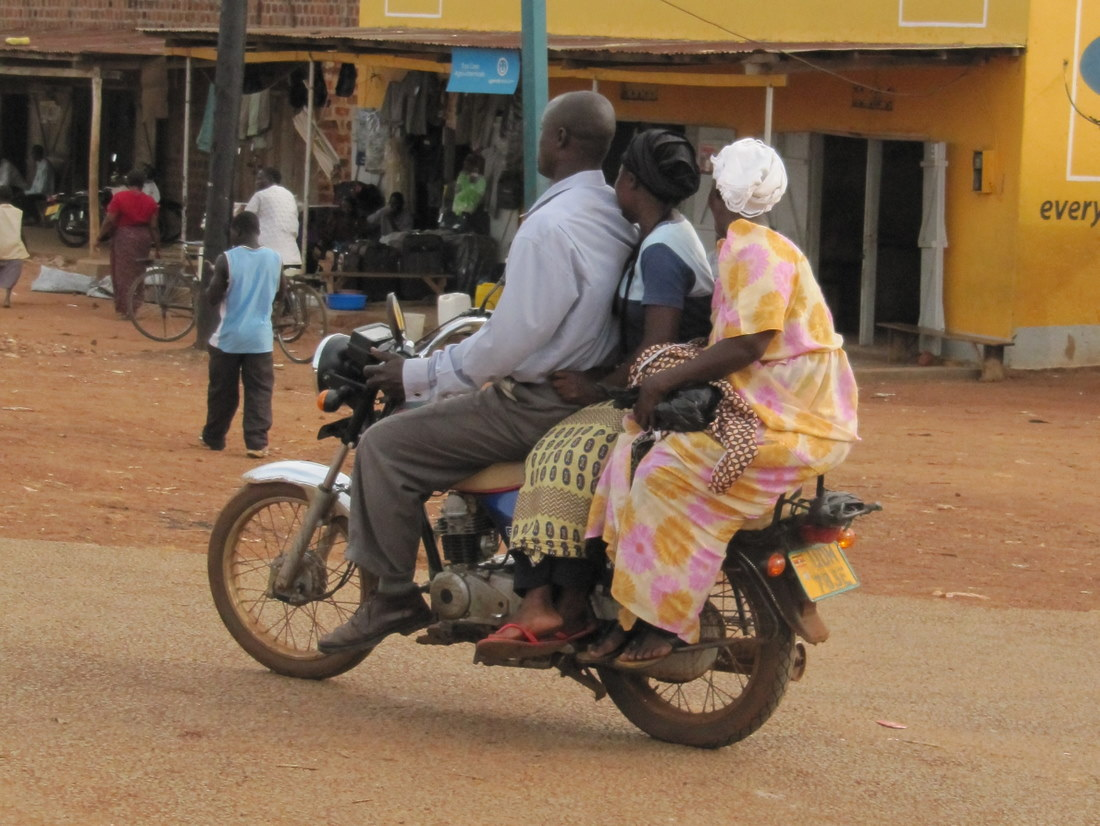
Boda-boda towards Malaba

== Overview ==
Malaba is a crossing point between Uganda and Kenya. In 2013, it accounted for 9.6% and 21.6% exports and imports border crossing between Uganda and Kenya, respectively, based on the volume of informal exports and imports.

Uganda Border Towns' Market Share of Crossborder Informal Trade with Kenya in 2013
Rank	Border Town	Share of Exports	Share of Imports
1	Busia	85.7%	68.7%
2	Malaba	9.6%	21.1%
3	Suam	3.6%	4.9%
4	Lwakhakha	1.4%	4.9%

== Population ==
The national census in 2002 estimated the population of the town at 7,600. In 2010, the Uganda Bureau of Statistics (UBOS) estimated the population at 9,200. In 2011, UBOS estimated the population at 9,500. During the 2014 national population census, the population was enumerated at 18,224.

In 2015, UBOS estimated the population of Malaba, Uganda at 18,400. In 2020, the population agency estimated the midyear population of the town at 20,800. Of these, 10,800 (51.9 percent) were female and 10,000 (48.1 percent) were male. UBOS calculated the population of the town to have expanded at an average annual rate of 2.5 percent, between 2015 and 2020.

Historical population
Year	Pop.	±%
2002	7,600	—
2010	9,200	+21.1%
2011	9,500	+3.3%
2014	18,224	+91.8%
2015	18,400	+1.0%
2020	20,800	+13.0%

== One stop border crossing ==
In February 2015, work was completed on the one stop border post at Malaba, Uganda. The new building contains offices of the Uganda Revenue Authority, Uganda Customs, and Uganda Immigration Services. In these offices, Ugandan officers are joined by their counterparts from Kenya to clear customers who are exiting Uganda to enter Kenya. In a similar building, with similar provisions, on the Kenyan side, officers from both countries clear travelers leaving Kenya to enter Uganda. This eases border formalities and reduces waiting times for travelers.

The project was funded by the World Bank, TradeMark East Africa, and the Kenyan and Ugandan governments. The building at Malaba, Uganda cost UGX:15 billion. Similar arrangements have been made at the Busia, Mutukula, Mirama Hills, Katuna, and Elegu border posts.

== See also ==
- Railway stations in Uganda
- Railway stations in Kenya
- List of cities and towns in Uganda
