= Mayuge District =

- District
- District location in Uganda
- Coordinates: 00°20′N 33°30′E
- Country: Uganda
- Region: Eastern Uganda
- Sub-region: Busoga sub-region
- Established: 1 July 2000
- Capital: Mayuge

Area
  - Land: 1,082.5 km^{2} (418.0 sq mi)
- Elevation: 1,350 m (4,430 ft)

Population (2012 Estimate)
  - Total: 461,200
  - Density: 426.1/km^{2} (1,104/sq mi)
- Time zone: UTC+3 (EAT)
- Website: www.mayuge.go.ug

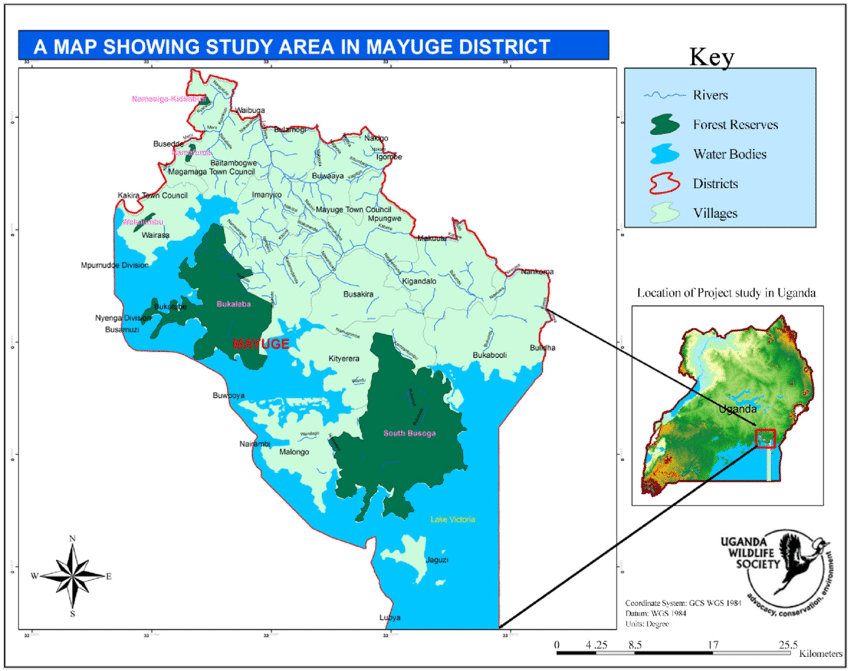
Map showing the location of Bukaleba forest reserve in Mayuge district.

Mayuge District is a district in Eastern Uganda. Like many other Ugandan districts, it is named after its 'chief town', Mayuge, where the district headquarters are located.

== Administration ==
Mayuge district is one of the districts in uganda located in the eastern parts of the country in busoga sub region. this district has one county called bunya county with over 16 sub county and town council. The 16 sub county and town council that make up Bunya county include the following as below.

- Baitambogwe
- Bugadde town council
- Bukabooli
- Bukatube
- Busakira
- Buwaaya
- Bwondha town council
- Imanyiro
- Jaguzi
- Kigandalo
- Kityerera
- Magamaga town council
- malongo
- Mayuge Town council
- Mpungwe
- Wairasa

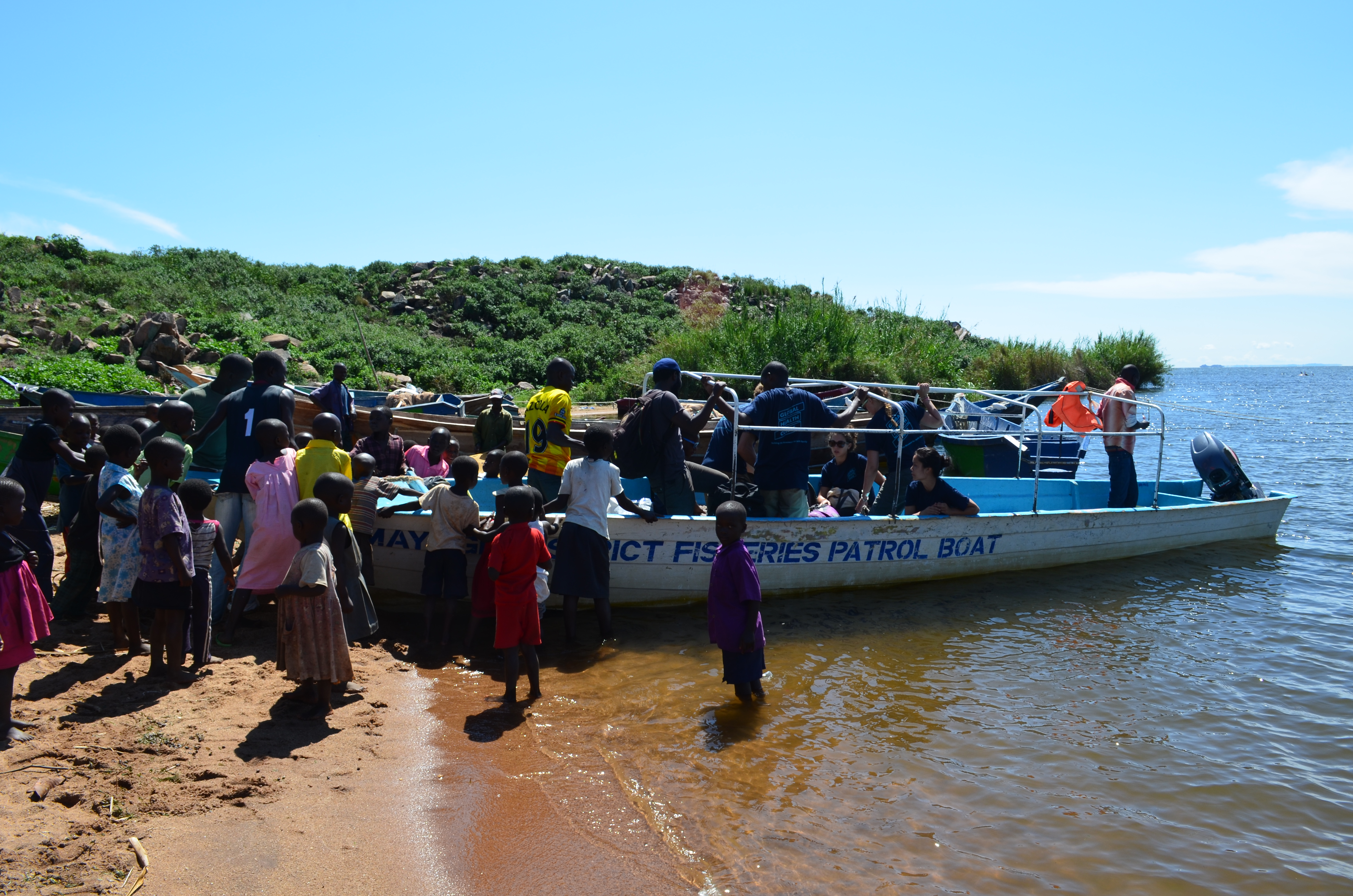
Uganda Development and Health Associates (UDHA) on the islands of Serinyabi and Kaaza, in Mayuge District, Lake Victoria.

== Location ==
Mayuge District is bordered by Iganga District to the north, Bugiri District to the northeast, Namayingo District to the east, the Republic of Tanzania to the south, and Jinja District to the west. The coordinates of the district are:00 20N, 33 30E. The district headquarters are located at Mayuge, approximately 38 kilometres (24 mi), by road, east of Jinja, Uganda's sixth largest city.

== Overview ==
Prior to 2000, Mayuge District was known as Bunya County and was part of Iganga District. Present-day Mayuge District, Iganga District, Kamuli District, Jinja District, Kaliro District and Bugiri District constitute the Busoga Kingdom. A large proportion of the district's surface area is open water of Lake Victoria. It is estimated that this represents 77% of the total surface area in the district. Another 10% of the district is protected national forest reserve. The district has many Islands which are currently occupied by permanent and migratory fishermen. These include the Islands of Seguti, Dagusi, Vumba, Kaza, Nambuga and Simu. The Islands are all easily accessible by motor boat or canoe.

== Population ==
In 1991, the national population census estimated the district population at about 216,800. The 2002 national census estimated the population of the district to be about 324,700 people, of whom 51.2% were female and 48.8% were male. The district population annual growth rate was calculated at 3.6%. In 2012, it was estimated that the population of Mayuge District was approximately 461,200. Estimate by the government projected by 2025 the population is roughly 700,258.

== Economic activities ==
Due to fertile soils and favorable climate, Mayuge District has great agricultural potential. However, the fact that open water and natural forest reserves occupy an estimated 87% of the surface area of the district, significant pressure has been exerted on the natural environment from the increasing population numbers. Most of the agriculture in the district is on the subsistence level. The crops grown include the following:.

- Maize
- Cassava
- Groundnuts
- Cocoa
- Cotton
- Coffee
- Beans
- Sweet potatoes
- Millet
- Simsim
- Sunflower
- Tomatoes
- Passion fruit
- Onions
- Cabbage
- sugar canes

Fishing is another high-value activity practiced in the district. This activity is the largest income earner in the district, accounting for 63% and 52% of the district revenue in 2002 and 2003 respectively. In 2004, an estimated 2,600 people were engaged in commercial fishing in Mayuge District. The fish caught from Lake Victoria include: (a) Nile Perch (b) Tilapia (c) Rargentae (Mukene) (d) Clarias (Cat fish) and (e) Protopterus (Lung fish).

In recent times, bee keeping for production of honey, is becoming an accepted and practiced method of earning an income in the district.

== Tourism ==
- Slave Trenches
- Bukaleba peninsular
- The Bishop Hannington Murder Site

== See also ==
- Mayuge
- Busoga sub-region
- Districts of Uganda
- Parliament of Uganda
- Eastern Region, Uganda
