= Busia District =

- District
- District location in Uganda
- Coordinates: 00°23′N 34°00′E
- Country: Uganda
- Region: Eastern Region of Uganda
- Established: 20 March 1997
- Capital: Busia

Area
  - Land: 730.9 km^{2} (282.2 sq mi)

Population (2012 Estimate)
  - Total: 297,600
  - Density: 407.2/km^{2} (1,055/sq mi)
- Time zone: UTC+3 (EAT)
- Website: www.busia.go.ug

Busia District is a district in the Eastern region of Uganda.

== Location ==
Busia District borders Tororo District to the north, Busia County, Kenya to the east, Namayingo District to the south, and to the south-west, and Bugiri District to the west. Busia, Uganda, the site of the district headquarters, is approximately 35 km (22 mi) by road south of Tororo, the nearest large town.

Busia district is made up of small administrative offices for example counties, Sub counties and Parishes as discussed below.

=== Busia Municipality ===
Sub counties and their parishes:

- Eastern division; parishes here include: Central ward, Northern C ward, Northern East A ward, Northern East B ward, Southern East ward.
- Western division: North A ward, North B ward, and South West ward.

=== Samia Bugwe central county ===
Sub counties and their parishes include the following as discussed below:

- Buhehe; The following parishes include: Buhasaba, Buhehe, and Bulwenge Parish.
- Masaba; Butangasi, Masaba, and Mbehenyi parish form masaba sub county.
- Masafu; The parishes in masafu include: Buhatuba, Kubo, and Mawanga parish.
- Masafu town council. This town council has three parishes and they include: Butote ward, Masafu ward, and Mawanga ward.
- Masinya: Three parishes of masinya sub county are Buminji, Buskho, and Masinya parish.

=== Samia bugwe County ===
Sub counties and their parishes:

- Bulumbi; There are two parishes in Bulumbi sub county and these are Bubango, and Buhobe.
- Busime; The parishes here include: Busime, Bwaniha, Mundindi, and Rukaka.
- Busitema; Busitema, Chawo, Habuleke, and Syanyonja parishes for busitema sub county.
- Buteba; This sub county has over four parishes namely: Abochet, amonekakinei, Buteba, and Mawero parish.
- Buyanga; For this sub county its parishes include:Bukhubalo, Busibembe, Buwembe, and Buyunda parish.
- Dabani sub county has Busia, Buwumba, Buyengo, Dabani and Nangwe parish.
- Lumino subcounty is made up of Budimo, Hasyule, and Lumino Parish.
- Lumino Majanji town council; The parishes include: Jinja ward and Lumino ward.
- Lunyo; This sub county has four parishes: Busiabala, Lunyo, Nalwire, and Nekuku.
- Majanji; The parish for majanji sub county include: Dadira, Junge, Majanji, Majanaji A, Majanaji B, Nagabita parish.
- Namungodi town council; This town council has Buhumi ward, Buhoya ward, Bulumbi ward, and Namugondi ward.
- Sikuda; The two parishes that form this sub county are Buchicha and Sikuda.
- Tiira town council; for this town council, it has three sub county and they include: Abochet ward, Ajuket ward, and Tiira ward.

== Population ==
At the 1991 national population census, the population in the district was estimated at 163,600. In 2002, the national census estimated the population at 225,000. In 2012, the mid-year population was estimated at 297,600. in 2014 it was 323,662 and 2024 it was 412,671 .

== Notable people ==
Notable people from Busia District include:

- Aggrey Awori, Former Uganda Minister of Information Technology (2009-2011)
- Barnabas Nawangwe, Professor of Architecture and current Vice Chancellor of Makerere University
- Benjamin Josses Odoki, former chief justice of Uganda
- James Munange Ogoola, former principal judge of Uganda
- Denis Onyango, Ugandan international association football goalkeeper
- Gabriel Opio, former minister of gender, culture and labour (2009-2011)
- Barbara Nekesa Oundo, former state minister for Karamoja affairs and the Busia District women's representative in the parliament (since 2011)
- Fred Wabwire-Mangen, professor of epidemiology, Makerere University School of Public Health
- Erasmus Desiderius Wandera, Roman Catholic bishop, Diocese of Soroti (1980-2007)
- Kevinah Taaka Wanaha Wandera, former Member of Parliament, Busia Municipality (2011-2016)

== Points of interest ==
The following points of interest are in the district:

- Majanji landing site on Lake Victoria for fish, which is one of the main foods in the district.
- Busitema Forest is roughly 25 km^{2} (10 sq mi); it is bisected by the main highway between Uganda and Kenya in Busia.
- Busitema University is a Government University located within the district.

== Economic activity ==
- fishing
- Wholesale and Retail sales
- Construction
- Metal repairs and fabrication

== Livestock ==
- Cattle
- Goat
- Chicken

== See also ==
- Busia County
- Districts of Uganda
- Parliament of Uganda
- Busia, Uganda
