= Busia, Uganda =

Busia
- Location in Uganda
- Coordinates: 00°28′01″N 34°05′24″E
- Country: Uganda
- District: Busia District
- Elevation: 3,930 ft (1,198 m)

Population (2024 Census)
  - Total: 63,681

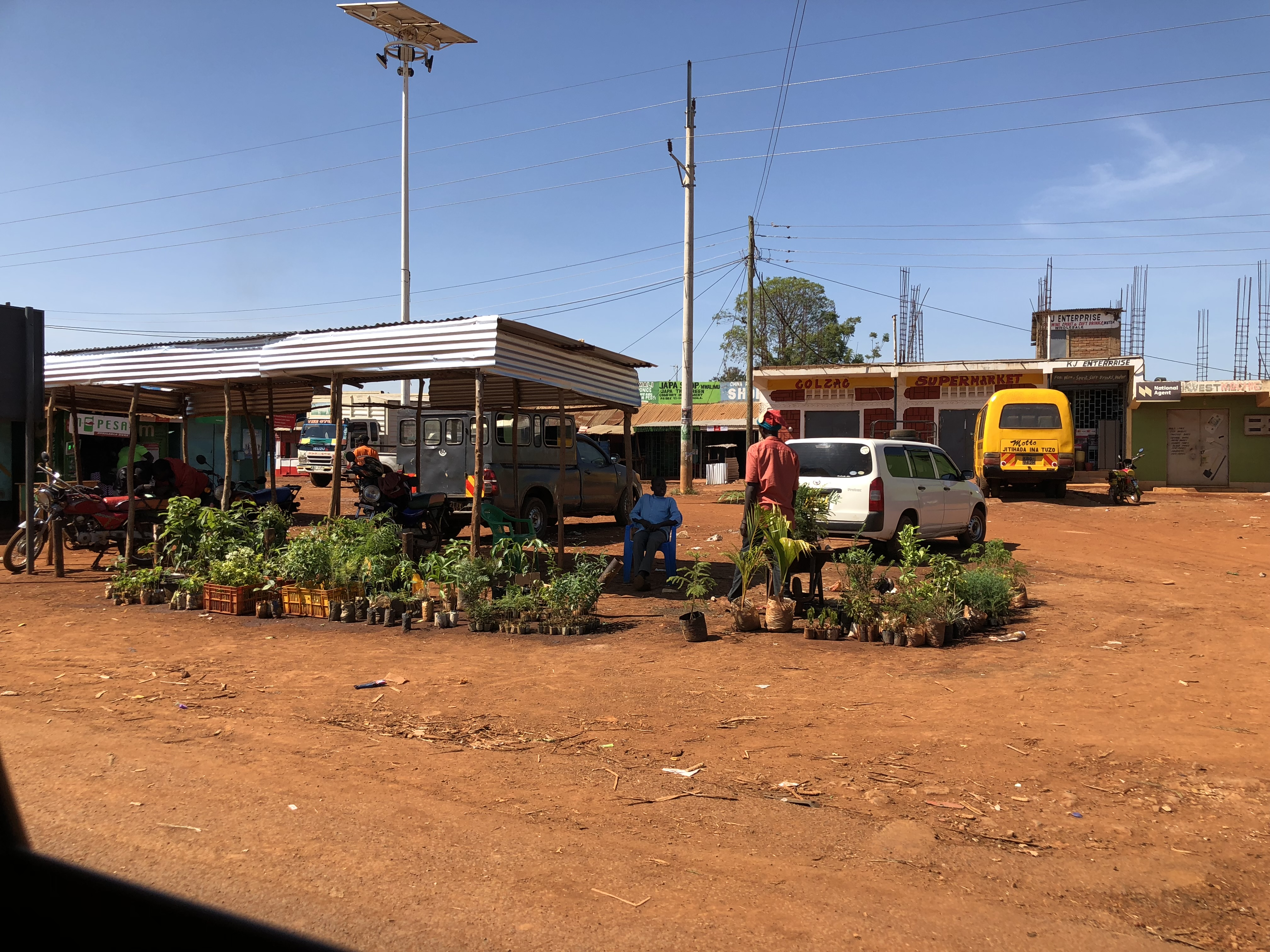
Busia centre

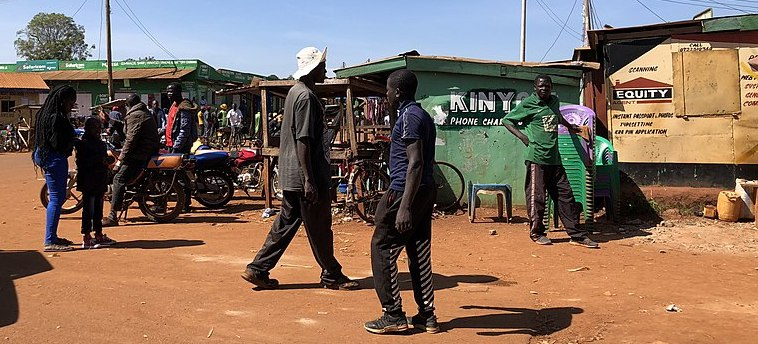
People walking in a street in Busia, 2018

Busia is a town in the Eastern Region of Uganda. It is the main municipal, administrative, and commercial center of the Busia District, with the district headquarters located there.

== History ==
In the Eastern Uganda campaign of 1979, Tanzania People's Defence Force soldiers destroyed a Uganda Army truck near Busia, killing several Ugandan soldiers.

== Location ==
Busia is at the border of Kenya, adjacent to the similarly named town of Busia, Kenya. Busia, Uganda is approximately 196 kilometres (122 mi), by road, east of Kampala, the capital and largest city of Uganda. This is approximately 28.5 kilometres (18 mi), by road, south of the town of Tororo, the nearest large town in Uganda.

The geographical coordinates of Busia, Uganda are 0°28'01.0"N, 34°05'24.0"E (Latitude:0.4669; Longitude:34.0900). Busia, Uganda sits at an average elevation of 1,198 metres (3,930 ft) above sea level.

== Population ==
In 1969, the national census that year enumerated 1,146 inhabitants in the town. In 1980, that year's census enumerated 8,663 people. According to the 1991 national census, there were 27,967 people in the town. In 2002, the national census that year put the town's population at 36,630. In August 2014, the national population census and household survey put the population at 54,798.

In 2020, the Uganda Bureau of Statistics (UBOS) estimated the mid-year population of Busia, Uganda at 64,900 people. The population agency calculated the average rate of the population growth of Busia, Uganda to be 2.94 percent annually, between 2014 and 2020.

Historical population
Year	Pop.	±%
1969	1,146	—
1980	8,663	+655.9%
1991	27,967	+222.8%
2002	36,630	+31.0%
2014	54,798	+49.6%
2020	64,900	+18.4%

== Economy ==
In 2005, Busia was the busiest border crossing between Uganda and Kenya. In 2011, the border post averaged 894 vehicle crossings every 24 hours. It was expected that in May 2016, the construction of a one-stop-border-crossing between Busia, Uganda and Busia, Kenya will conclude. The construction on the Ugandan side was completed in May 2016, and that on the Kenyan side concluded in July 2017. The entire project cost US$12 million in both countries, funded by the Department for International Development of the United Kingdom and Global Affairs Canada. The common upgraded border crossing is expected to be commissioned on Saturday, 24 February 2018, jointly by presidents Uhuru Kenyatta of Kenya and Yoweri Museveni of Uganda.

The one-stop-border-post (OSBP) at Busia, is the busiest in the East African Community, with Uganda's exports through the post being valued at UShs798 billion (approximately US$220 million) in the 2016/2017 financial year, according to a high-ranking official of the Uganda Revenue Authority.

== See also ==
- List of cities and towns in Uganda
