= Terrorism in Uganda =

Terrorism in Uganda primarily occurs in the north, where the Lord's Resistance Army, a militant Christian religious cult that seeks to overthrow the Ugandan government, has attacked villages and forcibly conscripted children into the organization since 1988. The al-Shabbab jihadist group has also staged attacks in the country.

== 1990s ==
From 1997 the Allied Democratic Front, a terrorist organization based in the Democratic Republic of the Congo, threw bombs into taxis and public buildings. More than 50 people were killed and more than 160 were injured. Suspects were held in safe houses. The Uganda Human Rights Commission and other non-governmental organizations criticized this process because suspects were allegedly held for more than the legal 48 hours before being charged with a crime and were tortured. In 1998, the Uganda Salvation Front attacked Tororo Prison and abducted several inmates.

== 2010s ==
On 11 July 2010, suicide bombings were carried out against crowds watching a screening of 2010 FIFA World Cup Final match during the World Cup at two locations in Kampala. The attacks left 74 dead and 70 injured. Islamist al-Shabbab claimed responsibility for the attacks as retaliation for Ugandan support for AMISOM.

On 5 July 2014, several tribal gunmen armed with machetes and spears attacked in Kasese, Ntoroko and Bundibugyo districts killing civilians, military officers and policemen. It led to loss of 93 people and property worth millions of shillings.

== 2020s ==
On 1 June 2021, General Katumba Wamala was travelling in a vehicle when four gunmen appeared and opened fire, wounding Wamala and killing his driver and his daughter. After a month of investigation, on July 1, 2021, authorities revealed that the attackers were Islamic extremists who were trained in a jihadist camp in North Kivu, Democratic Republic of Congo, and had links with the Allied Democratic Forces and the Islamic State.

On 24 October 2021, a deadly explosion occurred at a restaurant in Komamboga, Kampala, killing one person and wounding three more. The Islamic State later claimed responsibility for the attack. Two days later, an Allied Democratic Forces suicide bomber blew himself up at a bus in Kampala, wounding several people. On 29 October, two children were killed during a bomb explosion at a village in Nakaseke. The device looked like an exotic “jackfruit” and was given to the children while they were playing.

On 16 November 2021, twin suicide bombers exploded their improvised explosive devices (IEDs) near in the capital, Kampala. The three suicide bombers together with other three innocent victims died. Twenty-seven people were wounded and admitted at Mulago National Referral Hospital. The Islamic State later claimed the attacks through their Telegram channel.

On 16 June 2023, rebels of the Allied Democratic Forces (ADF), a jihadist group speculatively linked by analysts to the Islamic State, attacked a school in Mpondwe, a town in western Uganda's Kasese District on the border with the Democratic Republic of the Congo. Forty-two people were killed, including 38 students.

== Counter-terrorism legislation ==
=== Anti-Terrorism Act 2002 ===
The Anti-Terrorism Act 2002 makes "terrorism," and supporting or promoting terrorism, crimes punishable by capital punishment. It defines terrorism as,

"the use of violence or threat of violence with intent to promote or achieve religious, economic and cultural or social ends in an unlawful manner, and includes the use, or threat to use, violence to put the public in fear or alarm."

Livingstone Ssewannyana, Executive Director of the Foundation for Human Rights Initiative, says the act is "in conflict with international standards, particularly the freedom of expression and Association. An objective examination of the act from a human rights perspective shows that it potentially infringes on freedom of expression and assembly, including media freedom." The Minister for Internal Affairs can dissolve any organization the government designates as terrorist, and the government can then seize its assets if the cabinet agrees. In addition, the minister can designate individuals "authorized officers" who have the "right to intercept the communication of a person."

When the National Assembly debated the act, Internal Affairs Minister Eriya Kategaya said the government needed "this power to move quickly and decisively against suspected terrorists before they cause more havoc."

=== 2003 Terrorist Act ===
Colonel Leopold Kyanda, Head of the Ugandan government's Military Intelligence department, and General Aronda Nyakairima, Chief of Defence Forces, answered questions regarding Ugandan policy on terrorism in a press conference in February 2007. Colonel Kyanda acknowledged that "in the process of trying to arrest terrorists at times you find people who are innocent. As you all very well know, a terrorist does not have any boundary. So, operations against a terrorist are complicated. A terrorist does not wear uniform; a terrorist does not demarcate boundaries but is amongst everybody." General Nyakairima said the government does not have safe houses for holding terrorist suspects.

Kyanda said that innocent people who are arrested accidentally are often those who are with terrorists at the time of their arrest.

"Terrorism is more complicated than the ordinary crime where within the stipulated 48 hours you will not get [have got] what you want. So some of these individuals are held in transit, and we begin to get more information whether they are clean or not and then proceed with the cases. So that is what I can say about the innocent people we pick up [arrest] accidentally during terrorist operations."

== Counter-terrorism conference ==
Defence Ministers Amama Mbabazi of Uganda, Kivutha Kibwana of Kenya and Philemon Sarungi of Tanzania met with other military officials in Kampala, Uganda from 21–23 November 2003 in a U.S.-sponsored counter-terrorism conference.

Ugandan Military Intelligence Chief Colonel Nobel Mayombo told reporters in Kampala that terrorism is "one of the items high on the agenda of the meeting and how East African resources could be put in place to create security. The meeting will assess the three countries' readiness to defense challenges and increase information-sharing including issue on training. As for Uganda... we also have targets that have to be protected" because some of the countries near Uganda are "incubators of terrorism."

Representatives from the governments signed an agreement on tracking terrorist suspects in East Africa.

== United States citizens charged with terrorism ==
=== Peter Waldron ===
Ugandan police arrested Peter Waldron, an evangelist, along with six other suspects on charges of "terrorism" on 20 February 2006. Police say they found four AK-47s and 180 bullets under Waldron's bed contrary to section 7(2j) of the Anti-terrorism Act of Uganda 2002. Three of the other suspects are from the Democratic Republic of the Congo and three are from Uganda. Chief Magistrate Margaret Tebulya said Waldron had the arms "all without a valid license or reasonable excuse." The arrest came shortly before presidential elections, and the suspects had planned to found a Christian political party.

=== Christopher John Howdy ===
Ugandan police arrested Christopher John Howdy in Gulu on 20 November 2006, charging him with "terrorism" on 21 November. Police say Howdy had three unlicensed guns. Howdy was imprisoned in Kampala prison until the high court heard his case.

== Cooperation with Malaysia ==
Ugandan police chief Major General Kale Kayihura, Honorary Consul Noraihan Haji Adnan, Permanent Secretary of the Ministry of Foreign Affairs James Mugume, and Malaysian police chief Tan Sri Musa Hassan met in Bukit Aman Police Headquarters, Kuala Lumpur, Malaysia on 15 February 2007. They agreed to provide information on counter-terrorism, drug trafficking, riot control and marines. The Malaysian government will train the Uganda Police Force for the Commonwealth Heads of Government Meeting in November 2007.
