= Goli–Mahagi–Bunia Road =

Road in the Democratic Republic of the Congo

Coordinates: 02°13′07″N 30°45′48″E

Route information
- Length: 112 mi (180 km)

Major junctions
- North end: Goli
- Mahagi; Djugu; Nizi
- South end: Bunia

Location

Highway system
- Transport in

Goli–Mahagi–Bunia Road, is a road in Uganda and the Democratic Republic of the Congo, connecting the towns of Goli in Uganda with Mahagi, Djugu, Nizi and Bunia in DRCongo.

== Location ==
The northern end of this road is in Goli, Uganda at the international border with DRCongo. The road travels in a general south-westerly direction, through the towns of Mahagi, Ngote, Nioka, Djugu and Nizi, to end at Bunia, a total distance of approximately 181 kilometres (112 mi).

== Overview ==
This road is one of three roads that have been identified by the governments of Uganda and DR Congo, as of significant importance in facilitating trade, human interaction, regional integration, and enhancement of security along their common border. The three roads are: 1. Goli–Mahagi–Bunia Road 2. Kasindi–Beni–Butembo Road and 3. Bunagana–Rutshuru–Goma Road.

The road is expected to boost Uganda's trade with DRC, in agricultural and manufactured products, including refined petroleum products, as Uganda enters the oil-production phase. Uganda sells cement, sugar, electricity, steel, cereals and beverages to DRC. DRC, in exchange sells timber, kitenge, palm oil, cosmetics and gold to Uganda.

== Upgrades and reconstruction ==
Before 2019, the road was gravel surfaced, in various stages of disrepair. In November 2019, Yoweri Museveni of Uganda and Félix Tshisekedi of the Democratic Republic of the Congo signed agreements in Entebbe, Uganda, to upgrade this road to bituminous surface, within twenty-four months, after the relevant ministers have agreed on implementation details.

== See also ==
- List of roads in the Democratic Republic of the Congo
- List of roads in Uganda
