= Allied Democratic Forces insurgency =

Islamist insurgency in the DR Congo and Uganda

- Part of Kivu conflict and Ituri conflict
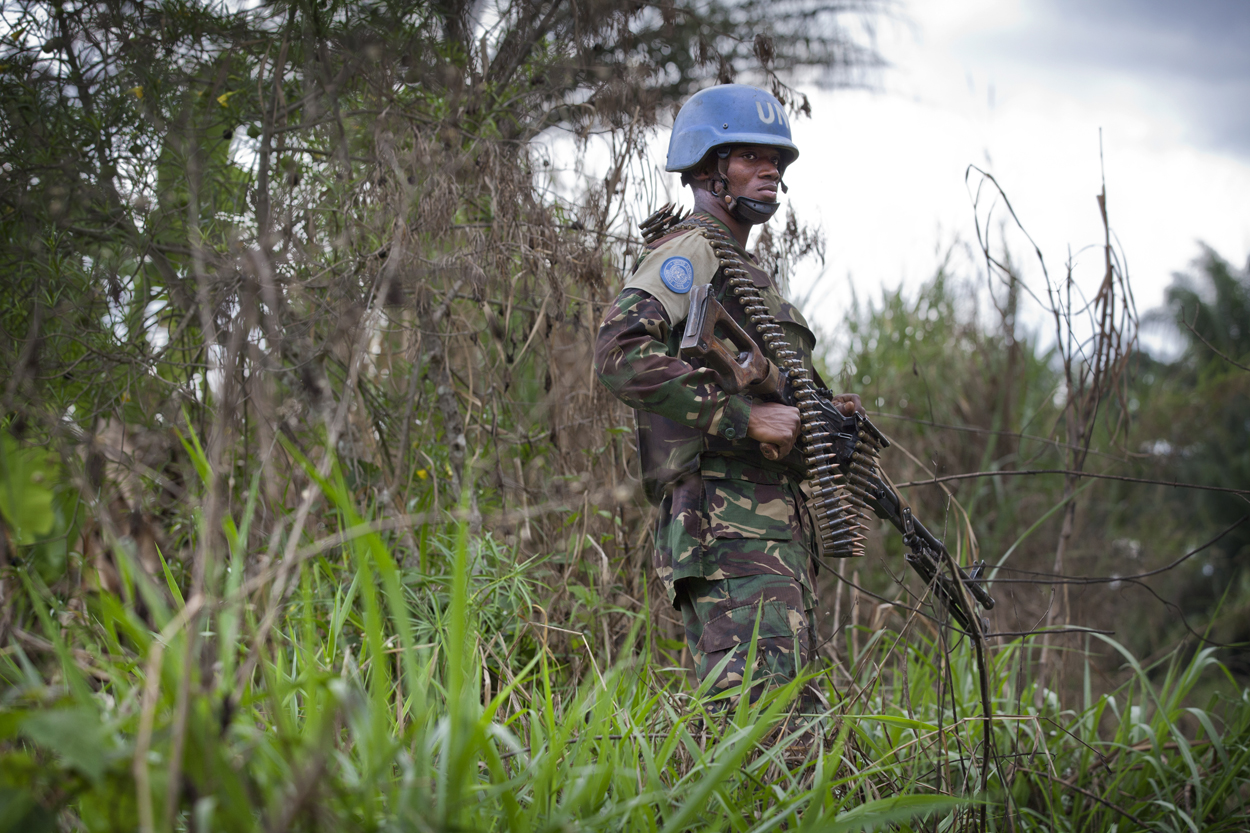
- A UNFIB soldier standing guard during an operation against the ADF on the outskirts of Beni
Date	13 November 1996 – present (30 years, 1 week and 1 day)
Location	Uganda and the DR Congo
Status	Ongoing

Belligerents
Uganda; Ugandan People's Defence Force; DR Congo; Armed Forces of the Democratic Republic of the Congo; MONUSCO; (United Nations) Force Intervention Brigade	ADF (1996–2015); NALU (early 1996); ISIL; IS-CAP; ADF-Baluku; ADF-Mukulu; NALU; RCD/K-ML; APC; Mai-Mai Kyandenga (2020–present)

Commanders and leaders
Yoweri Museveni; Félix Tshisekedi; Joseph Kabila; Marcel Mbangu Mashita; Jacques Nduru; James Aloizi Mwakibolwa	Jamil Mukulu (POW); Musa Baluku (WIA); Hood Lukwago (Possibly KIA); Yusuf Kabanda †; Muhammad Kayiira †; Ashraf Lukwago; Frank Kithasamba

Strength
(Democratic Republic of the Congo) FARDC: 3,500 soldiers (2005); 22,000 soldiers (2022); (United Nations) MONUSCO: 600 peacekeepers (2005); 3,000 peacekeepers	/Islamic State 1,500–2,000

Casualties and losses
Unknown; Many; 17+ killed (at least 15 Tanzanians, 1 Malawian, 1 South African)	1,590–2,090+ killed (In 1999); 314+ captured
- 8,000 people killed (including civilians, soldiers and rebels) (Note: Multiple sources:); 150,000+ displaced

The Allied Democratic Forces insurgency is an ongoing conflict waged by the Islamic State-aligned Allied Democratic Forces (ADF) in Uganda and the Democratic Republic of the Congo (DRC), against the governments of those two countries and the MONUSCO. The insurgency began in 1996, intensifying in 2013, resulting in thousands of deaths. The ADF is known to currently control a number of hidden camps which are home to about 2,000 people; in these camps, the ADF operates as a proto-state with "an internal security service, a prison, health clinics, and an orphanage" as well as schools for boys and girls.

== Background ==
The ADF was formed by Jamil Mukulu, a far-right Ugandan Muslim belonging to the Tablighi Jamaat group. Born David Steven and baptized as a Catholic, Mukulu later converted to Islam, adopting a Muslim name and becoming radicalized. He reportedly spent the early 1990s in Khartoum, Sudan, coming into personal contact with Osama bin Laden.

The ADF merged with the remnants of another rebel group, the National Army for the Liberation of Uganda (NALU), following the fall of Idi Amin. ADF-NALU's initial goal was to overthrow Ugandan president's Yoweri Museveni government, replacing it with an Islamic fundamentalist state. The group went on to recruit former officers of the Ugandan army, as well as volunteers from Tanzania and Somalia. Funded by the illegal mining and logging industries of the Democratic Republic of the Congo, ADF created 15 well organized camps in the Rwenzori Mountains, located in the DRC—Uganda border areas. The insurgence remained unaffected by government amnesty and talk efforts, as members married local women.

ADF has collaborated with al-Shabaab and Lord's Resistance Army, receiving training and logistic support, with limited direct involvement from al-Shabaab. Other alleged sponsors of the faction include Sudanese Islamist politician Hassan al-Turabi and former DRC president Mobutu Sese Seko.

The ADF was formed in 1989, gradually intensifying its insurgency. By 2002, continuous pressure from the Ugandan army forced the ADF to relocate most of its activities into the neighboring DRC. The insurgency continued on a smaller scale until 2013, which marked a resurgence of ADF activity, with the group launching a recruitment campaign along with numerous attacks.

== Timeline ==
=== 1996 ===
On 13 November 1996, the ADF perpetrated its first large-scale attack, on the towns of Bwera and Mpondwe-Lhubiriha in Kasese district, Uganda. Approximately 50 people were killed. 25,000 people fled the towns, before they were recaptured by Ugandan troops.

=== 1997 ===
Uganda expanded operations in the DRC from September 1997 onwards to attack ADF rebels. The DRC allowed these actions per DRC-authorized Ugandan deployments into Ntabi on 19 December, early February 1998, and early July 1998.

From 11 to 13 August 1997, a bilateral meeting took place between the DRC and Uganda in Kinshasa regarding Ugandan operations against ADF rebels.

=== 1998 ===
On 20 February 1998, ADF abducted 30 children during the aftermath of an attack on a Seventh-Day Adventist college in Mitandi, Kasese district.

On 4 April, five people were killed and at least six wounded when bombs exploded at two restaurants in Kampala. From 6 to 7 April, a bilateral meeting was held in Kampala between the DRC and Uganda; it concerned Ugandan operations against ADF rebels. Bilateral meetings would resume later that month, from 24 to 27 April, in Kinshasa. In the latter meetings, the "Protocol on Security along the Common Border" was signed on 27 April. It focused on ending all armed rebel conflict, especially in Ruwenzori. Thus, their militaries agreed to cooperate on border security.

On 8 June, ADF rebels killed eighty students of the Kichwamba Technical College in Kabarole District, Uganda. Eighty students were abducted in the same raid. In June 1998, ADF rebels abducted over 100 school children from a school in Hoima, Uganda.

In August, thirty people were killed in three separate bus bombings, perpetrated by ADF.

=== 1999 ===
Between 10 April and 30 May 1999, ADF carried out seven attacks, resulting in 11 deaths and 42 wounded.

On 9 December 1999, ADF attacked the Katojo prison facility, releasing 360 prisoners held for terrorism.

=== 2000 ===
On 20 April, Chief of Staff of the ADF, Commander Benz, surrendered to the UPDF, the first senior commander to do so.

=== 2005 ===
A two-day meeting from 21 to 23 April held in Lubumbashi discussed armed groups within the DRC. It was attended by the DRC, Rwanda, and Uganda, collectively termed the Tripartite Commission. The discussion primarily concerned the Democratic Forces for the Liberation of Rwanda's (FDLR) intention to surrender on the condition of disarmament and repatriation into Rwanda. On 21 April, Uganda accused the DRC of harboring the ADF within the DRC's border by the Ugandan Minister of Cooperation in Lubumbashi. The DRC's Minister of Foreign Affairs, Ramazani Baya, denied the claim. By 23 April, the Tripartite Commission released a statement affirming "their commitment to put an end to the threat posed ... by the presence and activities of the negative forces in the east." The three countries agreed to put into effect a US-backed information exchange mechanism for confidence building. Despite their mention in discussion, the statement made no mention of ADF rebels or their activity. The three countries planned to meet again in Kigali in August.

On 30 April, USAID's Office of Transition Initiatives (OTI) reported that its Disarmament, Demobilization and Reintegration (DDR) program disarmed around 11,500 former combatants since September 2004, with a thousand disarmed in September alone. OTI's Synergie d'Education Communautaire et d'Appui à la transition (SE*CA) community engagement and grant program indicated a success in diffusing ethnic tensions. Their program appraisal claimed that "there [was an] improvement on all indicators," with significant stability in many areas, including Kisangani and Bunia. Stability and greater acceptance sentiments caused war affected people in communities hosting the SE*CA efforts to participate in reintegration efforts more.

The Tripartite Commission Plus One, which included Burundi, met on 27 October in Kampala to further discuss foreign rebel presence in eastern DRC.

=== 2007 ===
During March 2007, the UPDF engaged ADF groups in multiple firefights, killing at least 46 in Bundibugyo and Mubende districts. The biggest battle occurred on 27 March, when the UPDF faced an estimated sixty ADF troops and killed 34, including three senior commanders. The UPDF claimed to have retrieved numerous weapons as well as documents that tie the ADF to the LRA.

On 13 April, the UPDF and ADF engaged in an intense battle inside the Semuliki National Park, near the upscale Semliki Lodge tourist destination.

On 4 December, two hundred ADF and NALU militants surrendered to Ugandan authorities.

=== 2008 ===
Ceasefire and amnesty talks between the government of Uganda and the ADF were held in Nairobi starting in May 2008. Negotiations were complicated by the fragmentation of the ADF's leadership. Non-combatant dependents of the ADF were repatriated to Uganda by the IOM. At least 48 ADF fighters surrendered and were given amnesty. As the threat from the LRA in the DRC waned, the UPDF put increasing focus on the ADF as a reason for UPDF personnel to remain in the DRC.

=== 2012 ===
Between February to March 2012, over sixty ADF insurgents were arrested within Uganda. Between November 2012 and November 2013, ADF carried out 300 kidnappings.

=== 2014 ===
A report by New York University in September 2017 found that Congolese army commanders orchastrated massacres in Beni from 2014 to 2016. It cited multiple witnesses saying that army commanders, including the former top general in the zone, supported and in some cases organized the killings. Sources told it that during some massacres, soldiers secured the perimeter so that victims could not escape. It stated that the first massacres were orchestrated in 2013 by former leaders of the rebel group Popular Congolese Army (APC), which fought in the Second Congo War to create a new rebellion and undermine confidence in the central government of DRC. The report found these rebels were working with ADF. However, when the massacres began, the army commanders co-opted many of the networks of the local militias to weaken their rivals.

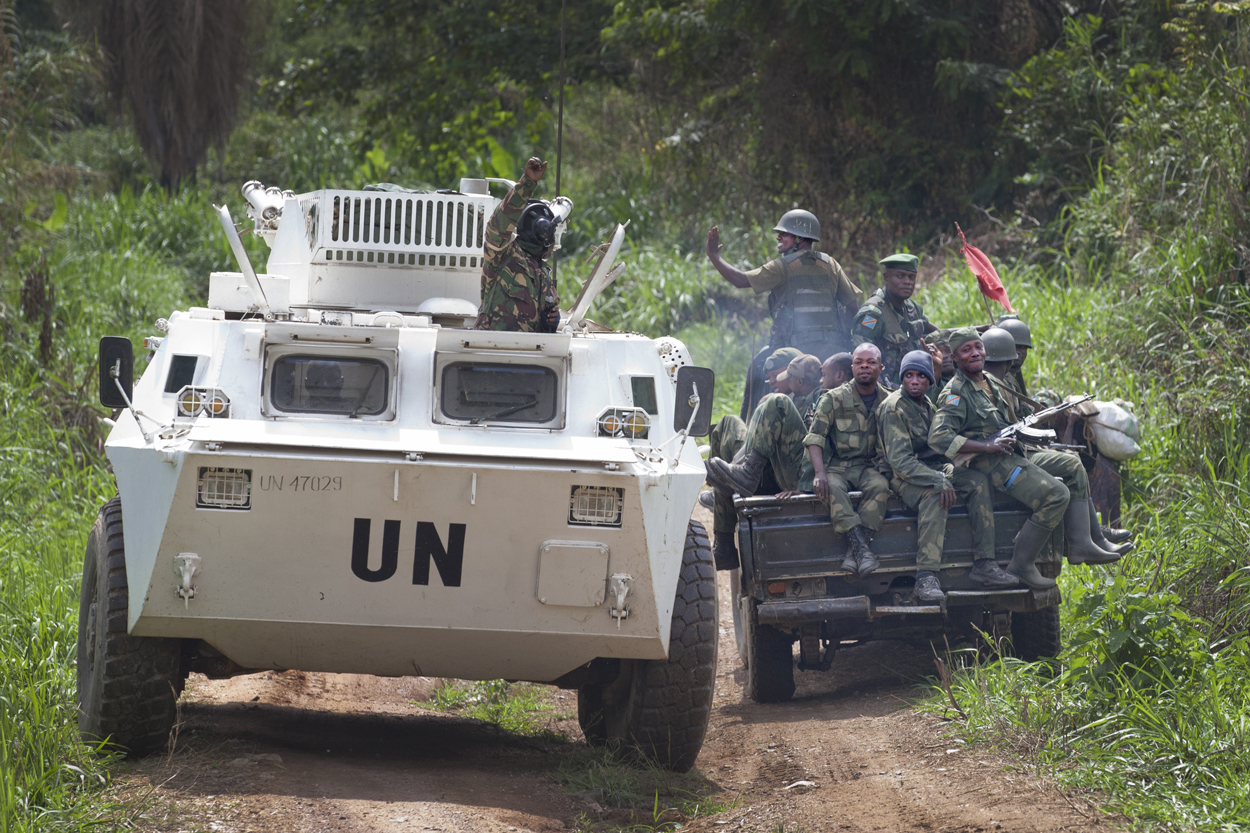
A joint MONUSCO-FARDC patrol during an anti ADF operation

On 17 January 2014, the Congolese army drove ADF militants soldiers out of the city of Beni, with the aid of UN's "Intervention Brigade" peace corps.

On 17 February, a Congolese army spokesman announced that the military had killed 230 ADF rebels in the aftermath of a monthlong offensive, 23 FARDC soldiers were also killed in the operation.

On 23 March, South African helicopters struck ADF forces for the first time, in support of Operation Sukola 1.

Between 5 and 8 October, ADF militants killed fifteen people, within North Kivu province. On 15 October, ADF rebels killed 27 people in an attack on villages, located outside Beni. On the 18th, ADF insurgents killed over twenty people, in an attack on the village of Byalos, DRC. On the 31st, a crowd stoned to death, burned, and then ate a suspected ADF insurgent in Beni.

On 20 November, rebels disguised as Congolese soldiers killed 50-80 people near Beni.

On 8 December, militants hacked to death 36 civilians in the vicinity of Beni. On 26 December, an ADF attack resulted in the deaths of eleven people, in the village of Ndumi, Ituri.

=== 2015 ===
On 4 January 2015, a joint MONUSCO—FARDC offensive forced ADF militants out of the village of Mavure in North Kivu. One rebel was killed; government forces seized large amounts of drugs and training materials.

On 5 February, ADF carried out a night raid on the city of Beni hacking to death 23 people and injuring one.

On 9 March, ADF rebels killed one and injured two civilians in the area of the Semliki bridge, North Kivu.

On 15 April, an ADF attack on the villages of Matiba and Kinzika, Beni-Mbau sector, DRC, led to the deaths of 18 people. On 23 April, ADF rebels massacred five civilians in the village of Kalongo, six kilometers northwest of Oicha. On the 30th, Ugandan media reported that Jamil Mukulu was arrested in Tanzania.

On 8 May, suspected ADF guerrillas attacked the Matembo neighborhood of the town of Mulekere, North Kivu. Seven people were slain in the attack bringing the region's 2015 death toll to over three hundred casualties.

In early December, the ADF seized a MONUSCO base in North Kivu, killing a Malawian UN soldier. South African UN forces later retook the base, attacking with Rooivalk attack helicopters.

=== 2016 ===
On 29 February, thirteen civilians were killed by suspected Ugandan rebels in the Beni territory in DRC. The killings took place in the village of Ntombi about 40 kilometers northeast of Beni.

On 20 March, the ADF shot into a car, wounding three people.

In early May, ADF insurgents armed with machetes hacked at least 16 civilians to death in eastern DRC.

According to the DRC, in July, at least nine people were killed in an ADF attack north of Beni.

The ADF has been blamed for the Beni massacre of 14 August.

=== 2017 ===
On 7 October 2017, the ADF ambushed a group of state officials near Beni, killing 22. The next day, the ADF attacked a UN base in Goma, killing two peacekeepers and wounding twelve.

On 8 December, hundreds of ADF insurgents launched a coordinated attack on a UN base in North Kivu province, killing at least 15 UN peacekeepers and five Congolese soldiers in an hours-long gun battle before finally withdrawing. 72 insurgents were killed in the firefight.

=== 2018 ===
On 15 January 2018, three DRC soldiers were killed, and five were wounded, repelling an ADF attack in Beni Territory.

On 2 February, in the eastern DRC, three people were killed in an attack by the ADF, who also looted a hospital.

On 3 March, six people were shot dead and another was stabbed to death in a raid by ADF rebels in the village of Eringeti in North Kivu province. From 5 to 6 March, twenty people were killed in several attacks by the ADF in North Kivu. More than fifteen others were reported missing, likely kidnapped by the attackers.

On 8 September, Muhammad Kirumira, a former police commissioner in Uganda, and his friend were gunned down by several assassins. In 2019, Ugandan authorities linked the attack to the ADF, and arrested two suspects. A third suspect died in a shootout with police on 28 September 2018.

On 4 October, the ADF attacked an army outpost in Beni, killing at least six people.

On 16 November, an ADF ambush near Beni left eight UN peacekeepers and twelve Congolese soldiers dead, and ten peacekeepers wounded. One peacekeeper went missing. On the 22nd, unidentified militants, presumed to be the ADF, fired on a UN helicopter in the DRC near the Ugandan border. UN forces returned fire before retreating back to their base. Although the helicopter was damaged, there were no recorded casualties. On the 27th, an ADF nighttime assault on Oicha killed six civilians. Congolese soldiers eventually repelled the rebels, killing one.

On the night of 11 December, ADF insurgents bypassed Congolese army units and launched a second attack on Oicha, killing nine civilians and looting several homes. On 23 December, the ADF attacked the village of Masiani, just outside Beni, killing four civilians and a soldier. Three civilians were wounded. On the 27th, a medical holding center for patients infected with Ebola virus was attacked. Three tents were burned, and supplies were looted. Congolese authorities blamed the ADF.

=== 2021 ===
On 1 January 2021, the DRC and UN peacekeepers captured Loselose from the ADF. Two DRC and fourteen ADF soldiers were killed during the fighting. Seven DRC soldiers were wounded. On 4 January, 25 civilians were killed and several more were kidnapped by the ADF in Tingwe, Mwenda and Nzenga villages. Secretary-General of the UN, António Guterres, again called for global ceasefire after the killings, he also urged the DRC "to take concrete steps to address the drivers of conflict in the east of the country". Local leaders Bozy Sindiwako and Muvunga Kimwele said that army intervened too late to push back the rebels. DRC officials announced that they discovered 21 bodies which were "in a state of decomposition" in Loselose and Loulo. On the 15th, three soldiers and thirteen civilians were killed when suspected ADF militants attacked the village of Ndalya, 60 miles south of Bunia.

On 1 March, ten civilians were killed in two attacks by suspected ADF militants in eastern DRC. Eight were slain in Boyo village, with two more in Kainama village. On 31 March, 23 civilians were killed in a village near Beni.

On 31 May, 57 civilians were killed in displacement camps near the towns of Boga and Tchabi in eastern DRC.

On 1 July, the U.S. Ambassador to the DRC, Michael A. Hammer, announced that the U.S. would assist in training and share intelligence with Congolese forces.

On 25 October, a principal actor behind many of the armed groups within eastern DRC, John Tibasima, is arrest by FARDC forces.

On 8 December, suspected ADF fighters killed 16 people at Mangina and Masiriko villages in North Kivu.

=== 2022 ===
The Ntoroko clashes were on 13 December 2022.

=== 2023 ===
The Kasindi church bombing was on 15 January 2023, and the Makugwe massacre was on the 22nd.

The Mukondi massacre was between 8 and 9 March.

On 14 June, 42 people were killed by the ADF in the Lhubiriha Secondary School attack in Mpondwe, Uganda.

On 17 October, the ADF killed two foreign tourists and their Ugandan guide in Queen Elizabeth National Park. On 24 October, the ADF killed 23–26 Christian civilians in an attack targeting the city of Oicha, North Kivu. On the 28th, the ADF killed two Ugandan soldiers and two civilians in a car park in Kasindi, Beni Territory. A fifth body, assumed to be a perpetrator, was also found.

On 12 November, the ADF tied up and killed at least 23 villagers in Eastern DRC. Some villagers fled by crossing the Lamia River into Uganda, but are suspected to have drowned. On 14 November, the ADF beheaded at least 14 people in an attack on a farming community in North Kivu. They also burned down houses. Other farmers went missing after the attack.

On 18 December, the ADF killed a local councilor and four of her clients in a restaurant in Kyabandara parish, Uganda.

=== 2026 ===
On 29 May, a human rights group reported that over 100 people were killed and several were abducted by the ADF during May in the Babila Babombi chiefdom, Masisi Territory, Ituri. The group called for more humanitarian aid to displaced persons, and stronger joint operations against the ADF by the Armed Forces of the Democratic Republic of the Congo (FARDC) and the Ugandan People's Defense Force (UPDF).

On 31 May, an ADF attack in the Ruwenzori commune of North Kivu killed at least 19 civilians.

On 2 November, ISCAP released a statement claiming attacks on the villages of Mangwandam, Bokoka and a third unnamed place in Ituri Province which occurred October 31st, self-reporting to have killed 11 Christian civilians, scorching multiple homes and looting possessions.

On November 6, IS-linked ADF forces raided a rural health clinic in the Christian village of Cantine-Aloya, North Kivu Province, killing 44 civilians and causing the release of six clinic patients suspected to have Ebola, with one being a confirmed case. ISCAP later affirmed its responsibility for the attack via its Amaq News Agency, claiming 60 civilian deaths and 200 homes scorched in combination with other smaller-scale attacks to nearby villages.

On November 11, ISCAP claimed an attack that allegedly occurred on November 8 on a Congolese army barracks in the town of Mabanga, North Kivu province. No casualties were mentioned.

On November 16, ISCAP claimed the death of a Congolese soldier and one injured in a skirmish with a FARDC patrol that allegedly occurred near Bitongui, Haut-Uele Province. ISCAP also claimed a separate attack that reportedly occurred in Kakofa, Lubero district, North Kivu Province, alleging to have beheaded nine Christian civilians.

On November 18, ISCAP claimed an alleged assault on the Christian village of Bitongui, Haut-Uele Province, attacking FARDC positions with machine guns, resulting in two soldiers and three civilians killed.

On November 19, ISCAP claimed an alleged ambush of a FARDC patrol vehicle that occurred in Bitongui, Haut-Uele Province, killing two soldiers and injuring three.

== See also ==
- Cocoa production in the Democratic Republic of the Congo, an industry directly affected by the insurgency
