= Bunagana =

Bunagana may refer to:

- Bunagana, DRC, a town in North Kivu Province, eastern Democratic Republic of the Congo, at the border with Uganda
- Bunagana, Uganda, a town in Kisoro District, southwestern Uganda, at the border with the Democratic Republic of the Congo
