= Mbarara–Kisangani Road =

Road in Uganda and the DRC

Coordinates: 00°02′30″N 29°42′55″E

Route information
- Length: 585 mi (941 km)
- History: Designated in 2019 (Expected); Completion in 2029 (Expected)

Major junctions
- East end: Mbarara
- Ishaka; Kikorongo; Mpondwe; Kasindi; Beni; Komanda
- West end: Kisangani

Location

Highway system
- Transport in

The Mbarara–Kisangani Road is a road in Uganda and the Democratic Republic of the Congo, connecting the cities of Mbarara and Mpondwe in Uganda to Kasindi, Beni, Komanda and Kisangani in the Democratic Republic of the Congo.

== Location ==
=== Within Uganda ===
The road starts at Mbarara, Uganda and makes its way westwards for 61 kilometres (38 mi) to Ishaka, in Bushenyi District. The road then turns north and runs for 73 kilometres (45 mi) to the town of Kikorongo, in Kasese District. The road then turns westwards and runs to Mpondwe, at the international border with the Democratic Republic of the Congo, distance of approximately 38 kilometres (24 mi). The total distance within Uganda is approximately 175 kilometres (109 mi).

=== Within the Democratic Republic of the Congo ===
From Mpondwe, the road will cross into the DRCongo to the city of Kasindi and then on to Beni, a distance of about 81 kilometres (50 mi) to the northwest. This also overlaps most of the Kasindi–Beni–Butembo Road. From Beni, the road turns north to Komanda, a distance of approximately 127 kilometres (79 mi). From Komanda, the road turns southwestward for approximately 627 kilometres (390 mi), to end at Kisangani. The total distance in DRCongo is approximately 840 kilometres (522 mi). The section that needs upgrading is quoted to measure approximately 760 kilometres (472 mi).

== Overview ==
The Mbarara–Kisangani Road is part of the Northern Corridor. This road is expected to improve cross-border trade, tourism, socio-economic development and promote regional integration. The project is being handled directly by the Northern Corridor Transit and Transport Coordination Authority (NCTTCA). The road is also a component of the Lagos–Mombasa Highway

== Upgrade to double carriageway ==
As of February 2019, the Northern Corridor Transit and Transport Coordination Authority, is working directly with the governments of Uganda and the Democratic Republic of the Congo do devise ways to improve this road. The work would involve paving the 760 kilometres (472 mi) of dirt roads in DRC and repairing and improving the 180 kilometres (112 mi) of bituminous roads in Uganda. It is estimated that the cost of the pre-requisite feasibility study, will cost about US$11.2 million.

In November 2019, Yoweri Museveni the president of Uganda and Félix Tshisekedi, the president of the Democratic Republic of the Congo, at a meeting at Uganda State House in Entebbe, signed agreements to work on key road networks connecting the two countries to ease business. Components of this road are included in the list of roads under consideration for upgrade, within 24 months from November 2019.

== See also ==
- List of roads in Uganda
- List of roads in the Democratic Republic of the Congo
