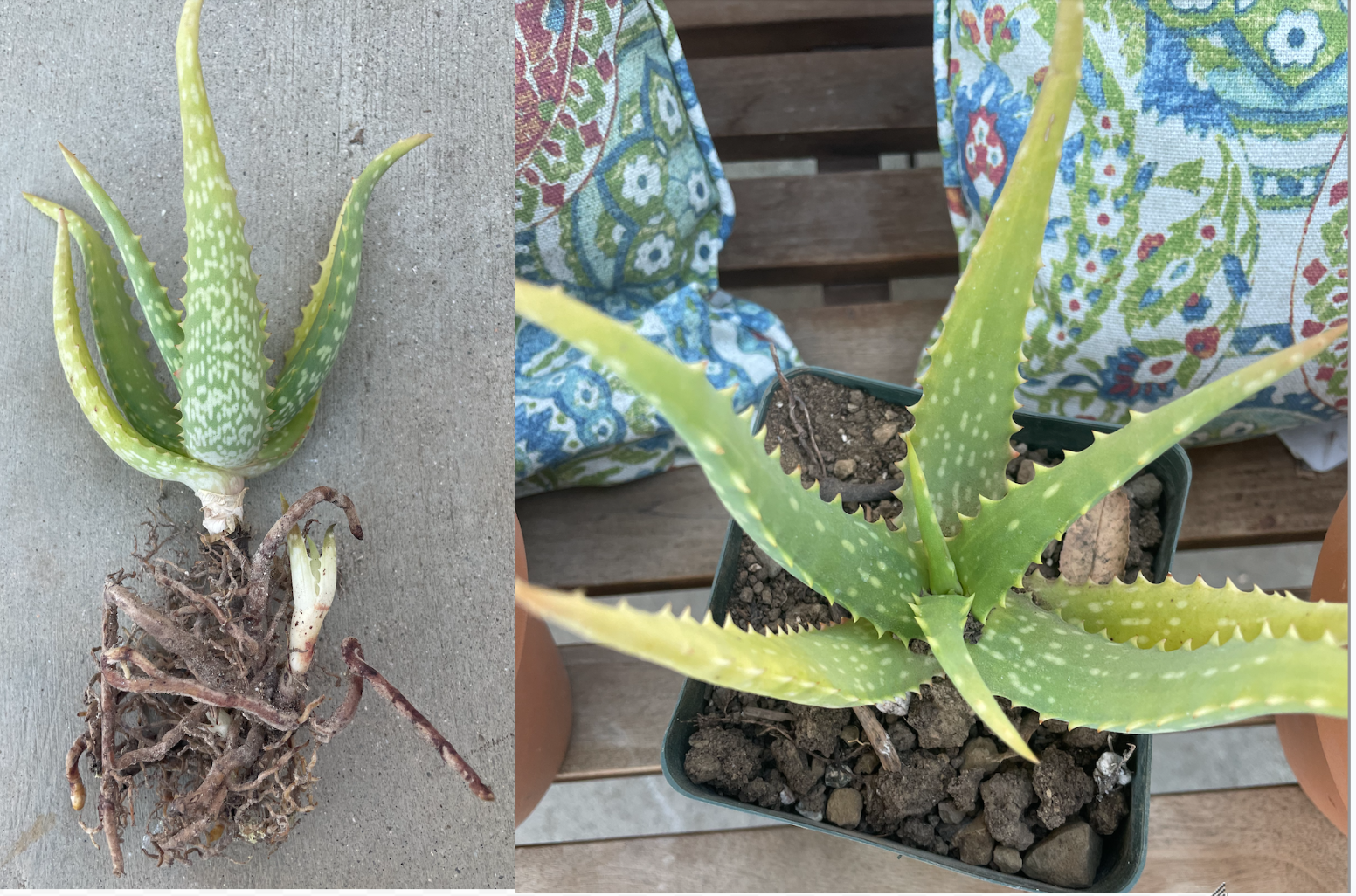

Conservation status
- Vulnerable (IUCN 3.1)
- CITES Appendix II (CITES)

Scientific classification
- Kingdom: Plantae
- Clade: Tracheophytes
- Clade: Angiosperms
- Clade: Monocots
- Order: Asparagales
- Family: Asphodelaceae
- Subfamily: Asphodeloideae
- Genus: Aloe
- Species: A. tororoana

Binomial name
- Aloe tororoana Reynolds

= Aloe tororoana =

Species of succulent

Aloe tororoana is a species of Aloe native to southeast Uganda.

== Description ==
This plant has rosettes to about 20 cm and also will clump. Plant leaves are green with white specks likely to radiate heat to cool the plant down in the desert. The plants are native to a location very near the equator, but because of the elevation, they have very good frost resistance.

== Flowers ==
Flowers are on racemes about 40 cm, and flowers are in clumps with bright red-orange with green tips.

== Entomology ==
The name references Tororo Rock which was then thought to be where the species was endemic to.
