= Kabale–Lake Bunyonyi Road =

Ugandan road

Coordinates: 01°15′10″S 29°57′52″E

Route information
- Length: 5 mi (8.0 km)
- History: Designated in 2019; Completion in 2022

Major junctions
- North end: Kabale
- South end: Lake Bunyonyi

Location
- Country: Uganda

Highway system
- Roads in Uganda

The Kabale–Lake Bunyonyi Road in Uganda connects the town of Kabale to Lake Bunyonyi, reported to be the second-deepest lake in the world.

== Location ==
The road starts at Kabale, Kabale District, the largest city in the Kigezi sub-region, approximately 410 kilometres (255 mi), south-west of Kampala, the capital and largest city of Uganda. From there, the road travels in a general south-westerly direction to the shores of Lake Bunyonyi, a distance of approximately 8 kilometres (5 mi).

== Overview ==
Lake Bunyonyi is an important tourist attraction in Uganda, due to its remote location, cool climate and the absence of crocodiles, hippopotami, bilharzia parasites and scarcity of malaria-carrying mosquitoes. The surface of Lake Bunyonyi lies at an altitude of 1,962 metres (6,437 ft), above sea level.

The road is used by tourists and residents who live on the more than 25 islands on the lake. Prior to 2019, the road leading from Kabale to the lake was gravel-surfaced. The government of Uganda intends to improve the road to class II bitumen surface, with culverts and drainage channels. Other road infrastructure around the lake is being developed to attract more tourists.

== Upgrade and funding ==
In March 2019, the Ugandan junior minister of finance announced that government had secured US$18 million to upgrade the Kabale–Lake Bunyonyi Road to class II bitumen surface and to procure a marine ferry to transport tourists and residents across the lake. At that time, the procurement process for a contractor for the road and a supplier for the ferry were ongoing.

In December 2020, the African Development Fund (ADF), approved a loan of US$71.5 million, as 86 percent funding for the improvement of this road and the Kisoro-Mgahinga Park Gates Road. The total road distance to be upgraded measures 34 kilometres (21 mi). Other related infrastructure developments under the same loan include the construction of two roadside markets and construction of four ferry landing sites on Lake Bunyonyi. The government of Uganda will contribute US$11.9 million as its 14 percent equity funding towards this development.

== See also ==
- List of roads in Uganda
- Kisoro
- Kyanika
