= Mpondwe school massacre =

2023 mass murder in Uganda

- Part of the Allied Democratic Forces insurgency
- Location: 00°01′41″N 29°44′09″E; Mpondwe Lhubiriha Secondary School, Mpondwe, Kasese District, Uganda
- Date: 16 June 2023; 23:30 (EAT: GMT+3)
- Attack type: Arson; looting; school massacre; terrorism
- Weapons: Petrol bombs, machetes
- Deaths: 42
- Injuries: 8
- Perpetrator: Allied Democratic Forces
- Motive: Jihadism

The Mpondwe school massacre was perpetrated on 16 June 2023 by Allied Democratic Forces (ADF) militants, who attacked a secondary school in Mpondwe, a town in western Uganda's Kasese District on the border with the Democratic Republic of the Congo. 42 people were killed, including 38 students; 8 were injured.

== Background ==
Following the radicalization of its founding leader, Jamil Mukulu, the ADF was formed as a merger of several rebel groups (initially called ADF/NALU) in 1995. The ADF initially operated in western Uganda but has since, and currently continues to operate solely in the eastern DRC; this includes the North Kivu and Ituri Provinces.

The ADF's leadership shifted after the imprisonment of Mukulu on 30 April 2015. Musa Seka Baluku, Mukulu's second-in-command since the group's formation, stepped forward in his place shortly after. Under Baluku's leadership, the group made contact with the Islamic State (IS) as early as 2017, were formally recognized as a chapter of IS–Central Africa Province (IS-CAP) in 2018, and formally pledged their allegiance to the IS in 2019. By that year, the ADF had split, with one part remaining loyal to Mukulu and the other to Baluku; the latter renewed their allegiance to the IS in April 2022. Since joining IS-CAP, the ADF increasingly targeted civilians into their attacks.

In response to growing causalities at the hands of the ADF, the Congolese and Ugandan armed forces created a joint military force called Operation Shujaa in November 2021. The Operation's already mixed perception, due to views of Uganda's role in the Second Congo War, was further put into question regarding its effectiveness in actually preventing ADF attacks.

=== Mpondwe Lhubiriha Secondary School and ADF attacks on schools ===
The Mpondwe Lhubiriha Secondary School is a boarding school located in Mpondwe, Kasese District. It is a privately owned facility, built by Canadian-led NGO Partnerships for Opportunity Development Association (PODA). At the time of the June 2023 attack, 63 pupils lived there. According to statements made by First Lady and Education Minister Janet Museveni, ownership and control of the school were a matter of dispute.

In 1987 Christian insurgent group the Lord's Resistance Army (LRA) began an insurgency in Uganda. The largest of their mass kidnappings was from a secondary school in 1996 in Aboke, Apac District, Northern Region. Islamist insurgent groups carried out suicide bombings in 2010 in Kampala, as well as in 2021 in Kampala and in the Central Region's Mpigi and Nakaseke Districts. The attack on the Mpondwe Lhubiriha Secondary School marked the first attack by ADF militants (who are allied to the LRA) on a Ugandan school in 25 years: in June 1998, the Kichwamba massacre took place carried out by ADF at the Uganda Technical College, Kichwamba, near the border with Democratic Republic of the Congo, killing 80 students who were burnt alive in their dormitories and abducting over 100 others.

== Prelude ==
According to major general Dick Olum of the Uganda People's Defence Force, security forces had received intelligence indicating the presence of rebels in the border area on the Democratic Republic of Congo (DRC) side for a minimum of two days prior to the attack.

== Massacre ==
The rebel attack on the school occurred at about 23:30 EAT. A group of five assailants set fire to the boys' dormitory and looted a food store during the assault. Forty-two people were killed during the attack, including 38 students, a school guard, and three local residents; according to the police, the deceased ranged in age from 12 to 95. Of the students killed, 20 were girls who were hacked to death, while 18 were boys who died during the arson. Eight people were severely wounded and hospitalized in critical condition. Preliminary reports indicated that six others were abducted, nearly all girl pupils. Some of the bodies suffered extensive burns, necessitating DNA tests for identification purposes. The attackers also confronted the wife of the school's director in her home on the compound, but because she was breastfeeding, they allowed her and her children to escape before setting fire to the house.

== Aftermath and reactions ==
Fred Enanga, the national police spokesperson, stated that a significant number of the bodies were transported to Bwera Hospital. Authorities stated that soldiers pursued the group, which fled in the direction of Virunga National Park in the DRC. In addition, the Ugandan Army has mobilized aircraft to assist in locating the rebel group.

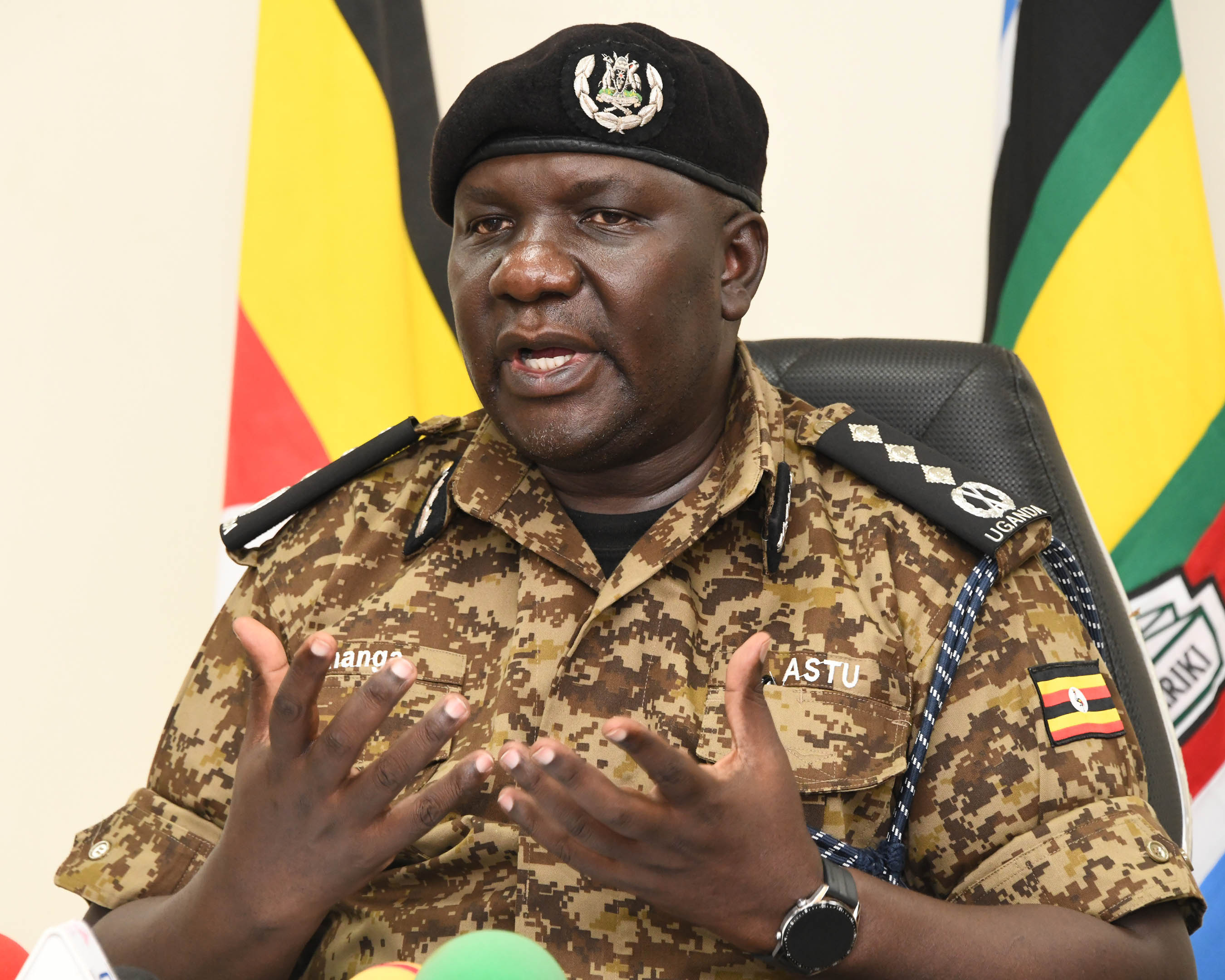
Fred Enanga

Uganda's National Police identified the ADF as responsible for the attack. In a statement on 19 June, Enanga announced the arrest of 20 persons suspected of collaborating with the ADF, including the school's director and headmaster. He also said that the number of abducted pupils remained uncertain, but was about six. On 21 June, the Ugandan forces rescued three of the abducted students inside the Virunga National Park in the DRC. Military spokesman Felix Kulayigye said two terrorists were killed, and two guns were recovered during the rescue. A woman with two children who had been kidnapped outside the school was also rescued.

=== Domestic ===
The Ministry of Education and Sports compensated each of the bereaved families with 5 million shillings (roughly US$1,350, £1,058 or €1,238) to assist them with funeral expenses. The injured students received 2 million shillings to help cover their medical bills.

=== Intergovernmental organizations ===
The African Union, the United Nations, France, and the United States strongly condemned the attack and presented their condolences to the victims' families.

The United Nations Secretary-General, António Guterres, said in his speech that "Those responsible for this appalling act must be brought to justice."

== See also ==
- List of massacres in the Democratic Republic of the Congo
