= Makugwe massacre =

Mass murder in North Kivu, DRC in 2023

- Part of Kivu conflict
- Location: Makugwe, North Kivu, Democratic Republic of the Congo
- Date: 22 January 2023
- Deaths: 17-24 killed (per Congolese army); 23 killed and 3 missing (per witnesses)
- Perpetrators: ISIL: IS-CAP; ADF-Baluku

On 22 January 2023 in Makugwe in the Democratic Republic of the Congo, Allied Democratic Forces (ADF) militants killed about 20 people.

== Background ==
Following the radicalization of its founding leader, Jamil Mukulu, the ADF was formed as a merger of several rebel groups (initially called ADF/NALU) in 1995. The ADF initially operated in western Uganda but has since, and currently continues to operate solely in the eastern DRC; this includes the North Kivu and Ituri Provinces.

The ADF's leadership shifted after the imprisonment of Mukulu on 30 April 2015. Musa Seka Baluku, Mukulu's second-in-command since the group's formation, stepped forward in his place shortly after. Under Baluku's leadership, the group made contact with the Islamic State (IS) as early as 2017, were formally recognized as a chapter of IS–Central Africa Province (IS-CAP) in 2018, and formally pledged their allegiance to the IS in 2019. By that year, the ADF had split, with one part remaining loyal to Mukulu and the other to Baluku; the latter renewed their allegiance to the IS in April 2022. Since joining IS-CAP, the ADF increasingly targeted civilians into their attacks.

In response to growing causalities at the hands of the ADF, the Congolese and Ugandan armed forces created a joint military force called Operation Shujaa in November 2021. The Operation's already mixed perception, due to views of Uganda's role in the Second Congo War, was further put into question regarding its effectiveness in actually preventing ADF attacks.

Days prior to the attack on Makugwe, on 15 January 2023, a suspected ADF militant bombed a church in Kasindi, North Kivu.

== Attack ==
On the evening of 22 January 2023, the Allied Democratic Forces killed between 17 and 24 people in Makugwe, a village near Beni, North Kivu, in the east of the Democratic Republic of the Congo. The massacre occurred at a bar; the insurgents also looted and set fire to several homes and shops, and kidnapped several people. Provincial deputy Saidi Balikwisha, who was in Makugwe during the attack, claimed the death toll to be 23 and stated at least 3 others were reported missing. On 23 January, Islamic State claimed responsibility for the attack.
