= 2010 Kampala bombings =

Suicide bombings in Kampala, Uganda

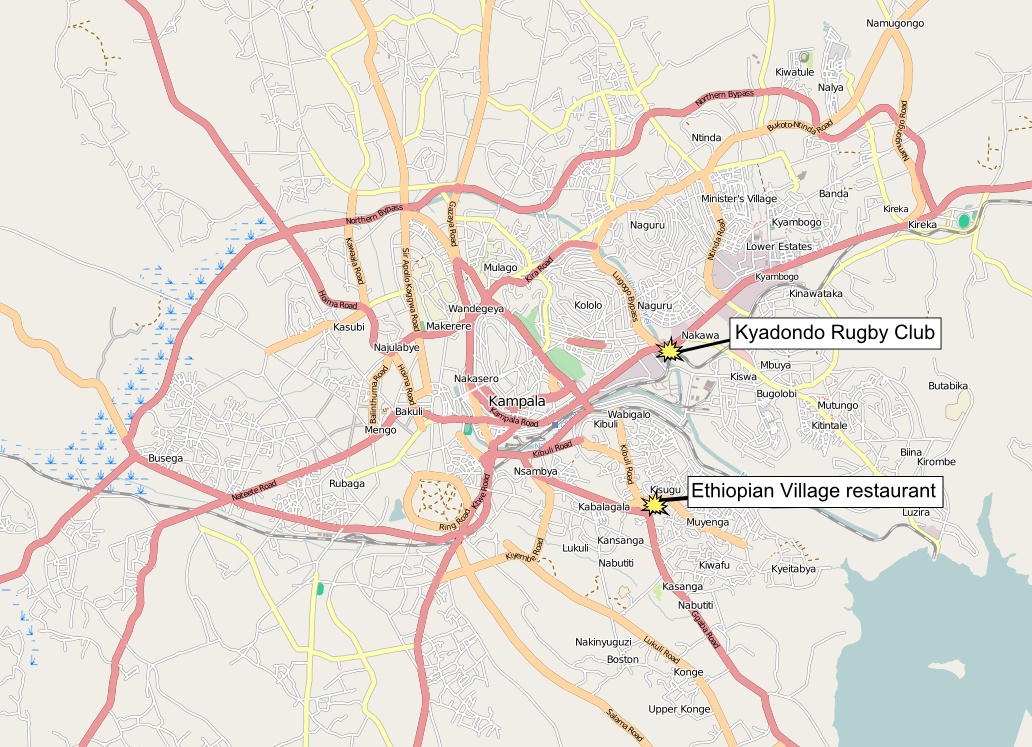
- Map of the two attack locations
- Location: 00°17′57″N 32°36′18″E (Ethiopian Village); 00°19′30″N 32°36′28″E (Kyadondo Rugby Club); Kampala, Uganda
- Date: 11 July 2010; 10:25 pm – approx. 11:18 pm (UTC+3)
- Target: Crowds watching broadcasts of the FIFA World Cup Final
- Attack type: Suicide bombings
- Weapon: Explosive belts
- Deaths: 74
- Injuries: 85
- Perpetrator: Al-Shabaab

On 11 July 2010, suicide bombings were carried out against crowds watching a screening of the 2010 FIFA World Cup Final at two locations in Kampala, the capital city of Uganda. The attacks left 74 dead and 85 injured. Al-Shabaab, an Islamist militia based in Somalia that has ties to al-Qaeda, claimed responsibility for the blasts as retaliation for Ugandan support for AMISOM. In March 2015, the trial of 13 Kenyan, Ugandan and Tanzanian alleged perpetrators of the bombings began at the High Court of Uganda.

== Background ==
The al-Shabaab jihadist group grew into a potent force against the Transitional Federal Government (TFG) of Somalia and threatened attacks against foreign and AMISOM troops deployed against it in the country, including those from Uganda. The attacks in Kampala were seen as revenge against the Ugandan forces' presence in Somalia. Al-Qaeda was also rumoured to have been involved in Somalia. The Kampala bombings followed American warnings of attacks on Air Uganda planes in 2010.

== Attacks ==
The first bombing was carried out at the Ethiopian Village restaurant, situated in the Kabalagala neighbourhood. Fifteen people were killed and many of the victims were foreigners. The Kabalagala bombing occurred during the 2010 FIFA World Cup final.

The second attack, consisting of two explosions in quick succession, occurred at 11:18 pm at Kyadondo Rugby Club in Nakawa, where state-run newspaper New Vision was hosting a screening of the match. According to eyewitnesses, there was an explosion around the 90th minute of the match, followed seconds later by a second explosion that knocked out the lights on the field. An explosion went off directly in front of a large screen that was showing the telecast from South Africa, killing 49 people. The discovery of a severed head and leg at the rugby field suggests that it was a suicide attack carried out by an individual. A third unexploded vest was later found. A police officer put the total death toll as 64. A further 71 were hospitalized, 14 of whom were treated for minor injuries and later discharged.

Uganda National Police inspector general Kale Kayihura stated, "The information we have indicates the people who have attacked the Ethiopian Village were probably targeting expatriates."

Initial reports of further blasts in the neighbourhoods of Ntinda and Bwaise were false.

== Casualties ==
Deaths by nationality
Country	Number
Uganda	62
Eritrea	6
Ethiopia	1
Ireland	1
Kenya	1
Sri Lanka	1
India	1
United States	1
Total	74

Most of the dead were Ugandan. Others included: a Sri Lankan, an Indian, an Irish Lay missionary, one American, one Ethiopian, six Eritreans, and one Kenyan.

The injured also included six Methodist missionaries from a Pennsylvania church.

== Investigation ==
Ugandan police made arrests in the days following the attack. Another Ugandan was arrested in Kenya over the attacks. Twenty people were arrested, including several Pakistanis, and Interpol also published facial reconstructions of two suspected bombers.

Three Kenyans—Hussein Hassan Agad, Mohamed Adan Abdow and Idris Magondu—were charged with 76 counts of murder. The Chief Magistrate, however, said they were not allowed to enter a plea because the court does not have jurisdiction to rule on the crime of terrorism. They are due back in court on 27 August, but will not be permitted to plead until the Directorate of Public Prosecutions decides the case is ready to move to the High Court. On 12 August 2010, chief of military intelligence James Mugira stated that all suspects at the time had been arrested. On 18 August 2010, Ugandan officials charged 32 people with murder. John Kagezi, the state attorney, said four of those charged confessed to the attacks. Court hearings were to start for the Ugandan, Kenyan and Somali nationals on 2 September 2010; though police said continued investigations were ongoing and that more arrests may follow.

== Responsibility ==
Al-Shabaab, the main group in the Islamist insurgency in Somalia, claimed responsibility for the attacks. The Wall Street Journal quotes an unnamed al-Shabaab senior leader stating, "We have reached our objective. We killed many Christians in the enemy capital (Kampala)." Reports also allege confirmation from other al-Shabaab militants. This is al-Shabaab's first attack outside of Somalia. On 9 July, al-Shabaab leader Sheikh Mukhtar Robow had called for attacks against Uganda and Burundi. Al-Shabaab leader Sheik Yusuf Sheik Issa told Reuters "Uganda is a major infidel country supporting the so-called government of Somalia. We know Uganda is against Islam and so we are very happy at what has happened in Kampala. That is the best news we ever heard." However he refused to confirm or deny responsibility after the attacks, also stating, "Uganda is one of our enemies. Whatever makes them cry, makes us happy. May Allah's anger be upon those who are against us." By 12 July, Sheik Ali Mohamud Rage from Mogadishu stated "We will carry out attacks against our enemy wherever they are ... No one will deter us from performing our Islamic duty." Sheik Ali Mohamud Rage, a spokesman for the group saying "Al-Shabab was behind the two blasts in Uganda. We thank the mujahideens that carried out the attack. We are sending a message to Uganda and Burundi, if they do not take out their Amisom troops from Somalia, blasts will continue and it will happen."

On May 9 2015, al-Shabaab's media wing, al-Kataib Media Foundation, released the name and martyrdom video of one of the suicide bombers named Salman al-Muhajir. On 9 July 2017, al-Shabaab released another video of him.

== Reactions ==
Domestic

- Uganda – At an African Union summit in Kampala two weeks later, President Yoweri Museveni urged other African leaders to defeat "the terrorists" and "sweep them out of Africa."

Supranational bodies

- Malawi/African Union – President of Malawi and Chairman of the African Union Bingu wa Mutharika condemned the perpetrators "in the strongest terms," and asserted that "the African Union stands with you, my brother President [Museveni] and with the people of Uganda."
  - Virtually every speaker at the AU summit condemned the attacks.

States

- Chile – The Government of Chile "condemned in the most energetic manner the terrorist attack in Kampala... attributed to the Somali extremist group Al Shabaab. Chile values the contribution of Uganda to peace forces in Somalia (AMISOM), which is part of the joint efforts of the United Nations and the African Union to bring peace and development to that nation."
- Sahrawi Republic – The President of the Sahrawi Arab Democratic Republic, Mohamed Abdelaziz, sent a message of condolence to his Ugandan counterpart and families of the victims of the Kampala bomb attacks, and expressed condemn "in the strongest possible terms these attacks, as well as all forms of indiscriminate violence that aims to terrorise and inflict harm on innocent people".
- UK – Prime Minister David Cameron passed on his personal condolences to the Ugandan President. Foreign Secretary William Hague condemned the bomb attacks in Kampala calling them "cowardly" and stressed the "UK will stand with Uganda in fighting such brutal acts of violence and terror." He also sent "heartfelt sympathies to President Museveni"
- US – President Barack Obama in an interview with SABC claimed that the attack was an example of how al-Qaeda does not regard "African life as valuable in and of itself."

An anonymous U.S. government official confided to Jake Tapper of ABC News an administration belief that al-Qaeda is a "racist organisation" which practices discriminatory techniques and sentiments in the deployment of black African operatives (e.g., only targeting black African recruits for lower-level missions such as suicide bombings) because economic conditions in most African countries supposedly make black Africans more susceptible to recruitment than Arabs.

- Vietnam – Ministry of Foreign Affairs' Spokesperson Nguyen Phuong Nga on 13 July said: "We are extremely indignant upon learning of the two bomb attacks on 11 July in the Ugandan Capital of Kampala, in which many civilians were killed and injured. We express our heart-felt condolences to the Government of Uganda and families of the victims. We strongly condemn the attacks at civilians and hold that perpetrators of these attacks should be appropriately punished."

== Trials ==
=== 2011 sentencings without trial ===
In 2011, Edris Nsubuga, aged 31, was sentenced to three concurrent 25-year sentences for his involvement in the Kampala bombings. After expressing regret and indicating that he had taken part in the bombings under threat of decapitation, he was spared the death penalty. Additionally, 24-year-old Muhamoud Mugisha was sentenced to five years imprisonment for conspiring to commit terrorism. They later provided important evidence in the subsequent trial of 13 men.

=== 2015 sentencings after trial ===
In March 2015, the trial of 13 other men suspected of having been involved in the Kampala bombings began at the High Court of Uganda. The hearings had been delayed for five years due to court challenges by the apprehended individuals, who accused the Ugandan police and security agencies of torture and illegal rendition. The seven Kenyans, five Ugandans, and one Tanzanian were each charged with terrorism, murder, attempted murder, and of being accessories to terrorism, All but one were accused of being Al-Shabaab members.

The trial was again delayed when the prosecutor, Joan Kagezi, was murdered on 30 March 2015, purportedly by agents of al-Shabaab. The trial resumed in June 2015.

In May 2016, all defendants were acquitted of being members of al-Shabaab because, in 2010, that organization was not listed by Uganda as a terrorist organization. Seven of the suspects were convicted of terrorism, murder, and attempted murder. Ugandan Isa Ahmed Luyima, who is thought to have orchestrated the attacks, Kenyan Hussein Hassan Agad, Kenyan Idris Magondu, Kenyan Habib Suleiman Njoroge, and Kenyan Muhammed Ali Muhamed were sentenced to life imprisonment. The other two, Ugandan Hassan Haruna Luyima and Tanzanian Suleiman Hajjir Nyamandondo, were sentenced to 50 years imprisonment. Five of the suspects were acquitted (Kenyan Yahya Suleiman Mbuthia, Kenyan Muhammed Hamid Suleiman, Kenyan Mohammed Awadh, Ugandan Abubakari Batemetyo, and Ugandan Ismail Kalule). Ugandan Muzafaru Luyima was acquitted of terrorism but convicted of aiding the attackers. He was sentenced to one year of community service. Two sets of brothers were tried in this case: Isa Ahmed Luyima and Muzafaru Luyima; Yahya Suleiman Mbuthia and Habib Suleiman Njoroge.

== See also ==
- 1998 World Cup terror plot
- List of Islamist terrorist attacks
- Islamic terrorism
- Terrorism in Uganda
