= Kabale–Kisoro–Bunagana Road =

Road in Uganda

Coordinates: 01°16′58″S 29°42′05″E

Route information
- Length: 62.5 mi (100.6 km)
- History: Designated in 2007; Completed in 2012

Major junctions
- East end: Kabale
- Kisoro
- West end: Bunagana

Location
- Country: Uganda

Highway system
- Roads in Uganda

The Kabale–Kisoro–Bunagana Road in Western Uganda connects the town of Kabale with the towns of Kisoro, Bunagana, at the border with the Democratic Republic of the Congo and with Kyanika, at the border with Rwanda.

== Location ==
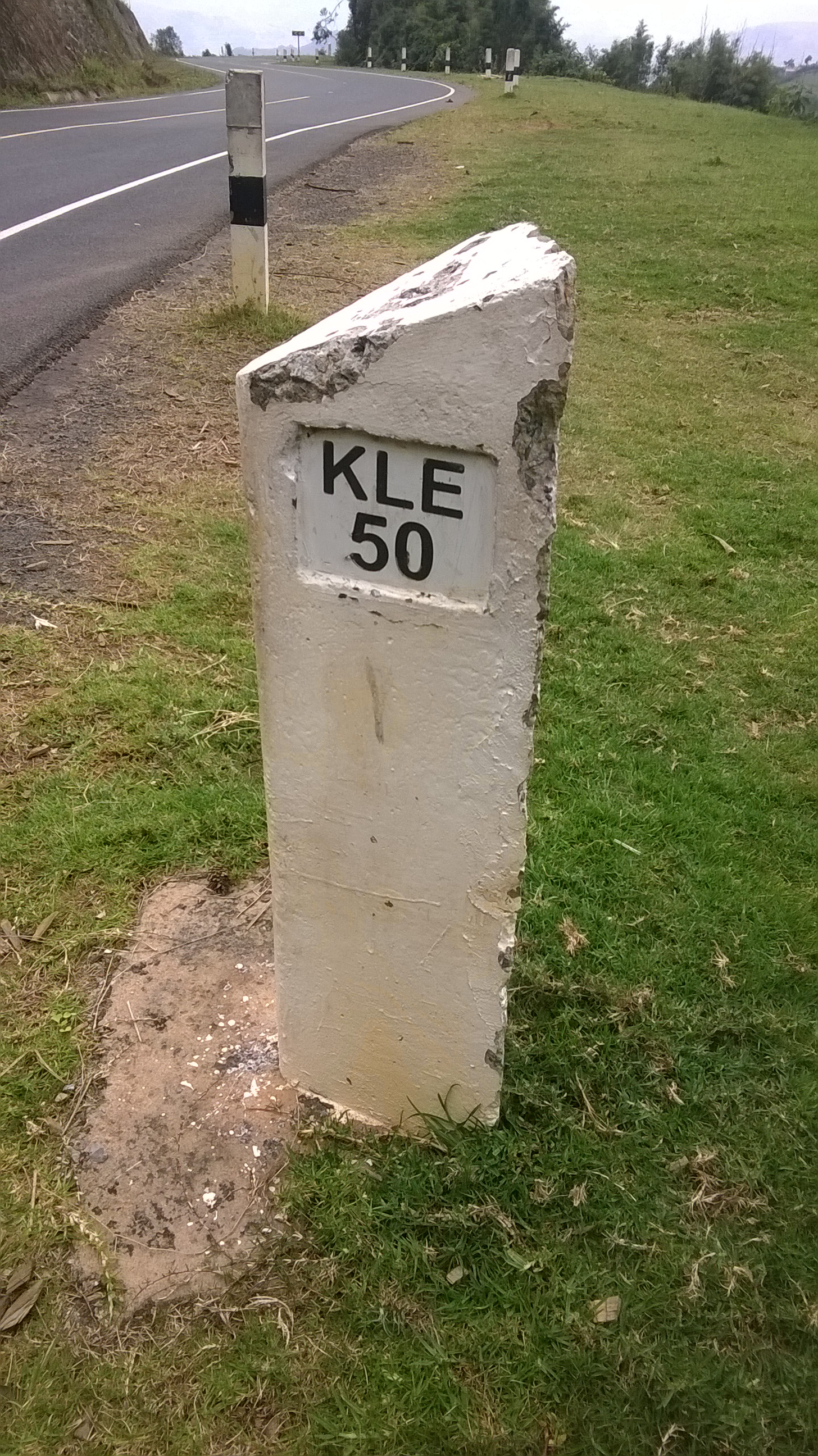
Milestone on Kabale–Kisoro road

The road starts at Kabale, (2014 pop. 49,667), the largest town in Kigezi sub-region, and continues westwards through Kisoro, ending in Bunagana, a distance of approximately 88.5 kilometres (55 mi). There is a 5.4 kilometres (3 mi) loop around the southern part of Kisoro Airport, added for safety concerns. Also at Kisoro, a 6.3 kilometres (4 mi) spur of the road connects to Kyanika, at the border with Rwanda. The road connects the countries of DRCongo, Uganda and Rwanda.

== Upgrading to bitumen ==
The government of Uganda earmarked this road for upgrading through the conversion of the existing gravel road to bitumen surface and the building of bridges and drainage channels. The construction contract with SBI International Holdings AG of Switzerland was signed in 2007. The contract price was USh: 195,445,535,968/- (approx. US$107 million at that time). 89.5 per cent of the cost was loaned to Uganda by the African Development Bank, while the Ugandan government funded the remaining 10.5 percent. The road improvements were completed in 2012.

== See also ==
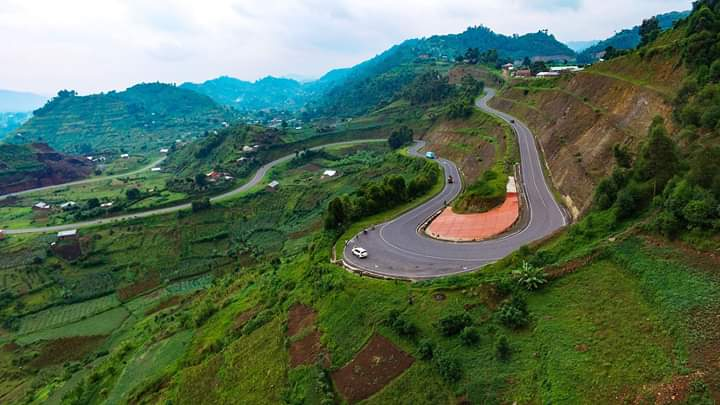
- Corner on kisoro kabale road
  Kisoro District
- Kabale District
- Economy of Uganda
- UNRA
- List of roads in Uganda
