= List of roads in the Democratic Republic of the Congo =

The following is a list of roads in the Democratic Republic of the Congo. The list is not exhaustive. Nominally, the DRC has designated about 40 national roads, but most are unpaved, and many are impassable due to disrepair or not yet built.

== Designated National Roads ==
The following roads are designated National Roads (French: Routes nationales):

List of national roads in the Democratic Republic of the Congo
Number	Name of road	Length	Status
RN1	National Road Number 1		
RN2	National Road Number 2		
RN3	National Road Number 3		
RN4	National Road Number 4		
RN5	National Road Number 5		
RN6	National Road Number 6	839 kilometres (521 mi)	
RN7	National Road Number 7		
RN8	National Road Number 8		
RN9	National Road Number 9		
RN11	National Road Number 11		
RN12	National Road Number 12		
RN13	National Road Number 13		
RN15	National Road Number 15		
RN16	National Road Number 16		
RN17	National Road Number 17		
RN18	National Road Number 18		
RN19	National Road Number 19		
RN20	National Road Number 20		
RN21	National Road Number 21		
RN22	National Road Number 22		
RN23	National Road Number 23		
RN24	National Road Number 24		
RN25	National Road Number 25		
RN26	National Road Number 26		
RN27	National Road Number 27		
RN28	National Road Number 28		
RN30	National Road Number 30		
RN31	National Road Number 31		
RN32	National Road Number 32		
RN33	National Road Number 33		
RN34	National Road Number 34		
RN35	National Road Number 35		
RN36	National Road Number 36		
RN37	National Road Number 37		
RN38	National Road Number 38		
RN39	National Road Number 39		
RN40	National Road Number 40		
RN41	National Road Number 41		
RN42	National Road Number 42		
RN44	National Road Number 44		

== Designated Regional Roads ==
The following roads are designated Regional Roads (French: Routes régionales):

List of regional roads in Kongo Central
Number	Name of road	Length	Status
R59	Regional Road Number 59		
R101	Regional Road Number 101		
R102	Regional Road Number 102		
R103	Regional Road Number 103		
R104	Regional Road Number 104		
R105	Regional Road Number 105		
R106	Regional Road Number 106		
R107	Regional Road Number 107		
R108	Regional Road Number 108		
R109	Regional Road Number 109		
R110	Regional Road Number 110		
R111	Regional Road Number 111		
R112	Regional Road Number 112		
R113	Regional Road Number 113		
R114	Regional Road Number 114		
R115	Regional Road Number 115		
R116	Regional Road Number 116		
R117	Regional Road Number 117		
R118	Regional Road Number 118		
R201	Regional Road Number 201		
R202	Regional Road Number 202		
R203	Regional Road Number 203		
R204	Regional Road Number 204		
R205	Regional Road Number 205		
R206	Regional Road Number 206		
R207	Regional Road Number 207		
R208	Regional Road Number 208		
R209	Regional Road Number 209		
R210	Regional Road Number 210		
R212	Regional Road Number 212		
R213	Regional Road Number 213		
R214	Regional Road Number 214		
R215	Regional Road Number 215		
R216	Regional Road Number 216		
R217	Regional Road Number 217		
R218	Regional Road Number 218		
R219	Regional Road Number 219		
R220	Regional Road Number 220		
R221	Regional Road Number 221		
R223	Regional Road Number 223		
R224	Regional Road Number 224		
R225	Regional Road Number 225		
R226	Regional Road Number 226		
R227	Regional Road Number 227		
R228	Regional Road Number 228		
R229	Regional Road Number 229		
R230	Regional Road Number 230		
R231	Regional Road Number 231		
R232	Regional Road Number 232		
R233	Regional Road Number 233		
R234	Regional Road Number 234		
R235	Regional Road Number 235		
R236	Regional Road Number 236		
R237	Regional Road Number 237		
R239	Regional Road Number 239		
R240	Regional Road Number 240		
R241	Regional Road Number 241		
R242	Regional Road Number 242		
R243	Regional Road Number 243		
R244	Regional Road Number 244		
R301	Regional Road Number 301		
R302	Regional Road Number 302		
R303	Regional Road Number 303		
R304	Regional Road Number 304		
R305	Regional Road Number 305		
R306	Regional Road Number 306		
R307	Regional Road Number 307		
R308	Regional Road Number 308		
R309	Regional Road Number 309		
R310	Regional Road Number 310		
R311	Regional Road Number 311		
R312	Regional Road Number 312		
R313	Regional Road Number 313		
R314	Regional Road Number 314		
R315	Regional Road Number 315		
R316	Regional Road Number 316		
R317	Regional Road Number 317		
R318	Regional Road Number 318		
R319	Regional Road Number 319		
R320	Regional Road Number 320		
R321	Regional Road Number 321		
R322	Regional Road Number 322		
R323	Regional Road Number 323		
R324	Regional Road Number 324		
R325	Regional Road Number 325		
R326	Regional Road Number 326		
R327	Regional Road Number 327		
R328	Regional Road Number 328		
R329	Regional Road Number 329		
R330	Regional Road Number 330		
R331	Regional Road Number 331		
R332	Regional Road Number 332		
R333	Regional Road Number 333		
R334	Regional Road Number 334		
R335	Regional Road Number 335		
R336	Regional Road Number 336		
R337	Regional Road Number 337		
R338	Regional Road Number 338		
R339	Regional Road Number 339		
R340	Regional Road Number 340		
R341	Regional Road Number 341		
R401	Regional Road Number 401		
R402	Regional Road Number 402		
R403	Regional Road Number 403		
R404	Regional Road Number 404		
R405	Regional Road Number 405		
R406	Regional Road Number 406		
R407	Regional Road Number 407		
R408	Regional Road Number 408		
R409	Regional Road Number 409		
R410	Regional Road Number 410		
R411	Regional Road Number 411		
R412	Regional Road Number 412		
R413	Regional Road Number 413		
R414	Regional Road Number 414		
R415	Regional Road Number 415		
R416	Regional Road Number 416		
R417	Regional Road Number 417		
R419	Regional Road Number 419		
R420	Regional Road Number 420		
R421	Regional Road Number 421		
R422	Regional Road Number 422		
R423	Regional Road Number 423		
R424	Regional Road Number 424		
R425	Regional Road Number 425		
R427	Regional Road Number 427		
R428	Regional Road Number 428		
R429	Regional Road Number 429		
R430	Regional Road Number 430		
R431	Regional Road Number 431		
R432	Regional Road Number 432		
R433	Regional Road Number 433		
R434	Regional Road Number 434		
R435	Regional Road Number 435		
R436	Regional Road Number 436		
R437	Regional Road Number 437		
R438	Regional Road Number 438		
R439	Regional Road Number 439		
R440	Regional Road Number 440		
R441	Regional Road Number 441		
R501	Regional Road Number 501		
R502	Regional Road Number 502		
R503	Regional Road Number 503		
R504	Regional Road Number 504		
R505	Regional Road Number 505		
R506	Regional Road Number 506		
R507	Regional Road Number 507		
R508	Regional Road Number 508		
R510	Regional Road Number 510		
R511	Regional Road Number 511		
R512	Regional Road Number 512		
R513	Regional Road Number 513		
R514	Regional Road Number 514		
R515	Regional Road Number 515		
R516	Regional Road Number 516		
R518	Regional Road Number 518		
R519	Regional Road Number 519		
R520	Regional Road Number 520		
R521	Regional Road Number 521		
R522	Regional Road Number 522		
R523	Regional Road Number 523		
R524	Regional Road Number 524		
R525	Regional Road Number 525		
R526	Regional Road Number 526		
R527	Regional Road Number 527		
R529	Regional Road Number 529		
R530	Regional Road Number 530		
R531	Regional Road Number 531		
R532	Regional Road Number 532		
R533	Regional Road Number 533		
R534	Regional Road Number 534		
R535	Regional Road Number 535		
R601	Regional Road Number 601		
R601	Regional Road Number 601		
R603	Regional Road Number 603		
R604	Regional Road Number 604		
R605	Regional Road Number 605		
R606	Regional Road Number 606		
R607	Regional Road Number 607		
R608	Regional Road Number 608		
R609	Regional Road Number 609		
R610	Regional Road Number 610		
R611	Regional Road Number 611		
R612	Regional Road Number 612		
R613	Regional Road Number 613		
R614	Regional Road Number 614		
R616	Regional Road Number 616		
R617	Regional Road Number 617		
R618	Regional Road Number 618		
R619	Regional Road Number 619		
R620	Regional Road Number 620		
R621	Regional Road Number 621		
R622	Regional Road Number 622		
R623	Regional Road Number 623		
R624	Regional Road Number 624		
R625	Regional Road Number 625		
R626	Regional Road Number 626		
R627	Regional Road Number 627		
R628	Regional Road Number 628		
R629	Regional Road Number 629		
R630	Regional Road Number 630		
R631	Regional Road Number 631		
R632	Regional Road Number 632		
R633	Regional Road Number 633		
R701	Regional Road Number 701		
R702	Regional Road Number 702		
R703	Regional Road Number 703		
R704	Regional Road Number 704		
R705	Regional Road Number 705		
R706	Regional Road Number 706		
R707	Regional Road Number 707		
R708	Regional Road Number 708		
R709	Regional Road Number 709		
R710	Regional Road Number 710		
R711	Regional Road Number 711		
R712	Regional Road Number 712		
R713	Regional Road Number 713		
R801	Regional Road Number 801		
R802	Regional Road Number 802		
R803	Regional Road Number 803		
R804	Regional Road Number 804		
R805	Regional Road Number 805		
R806	Regional Road Number 806		
R807	Regional Road Number 807		
R808	Regional Road Number 808		
R810	Regional Road Number 810		
R811	Regional Road Number 811		
R812	Regional Road Number 812		
R813	Regional Road Number 813		
R815	Regional Road Number 815		
R816	Regional Road Number 816		
R817	Regional Road Number 817		
R818	Regional Road Number 818		
R819	Regional Road Number 819		
R820	Regional Road Number 820		

== Other notable roads ==
The following roads are not designated as National Roads or Regional Roads, but are of significance:

List of other roads in the Democratic Republic of the Congo
Name of road	Length	Designated	Completed	Notes
Mbarara–Kisangani Road	940 kilometres (584 mi) in total of which 760 kilometres (472 mi) are in DRC.	2019	2029 (Expected)	
Congo Pedicle Road	70 kilometres (43 mi)			
Kinshasa Highway	3,082 kilometres (1,915 mi)			
Goli–Bunia Road	182 kilometres (113 mi)	2019	2024 (Expected)	
Bunagana–Rutshuru Road	26 kilometres (16 mi)	2019	2024 (Expected)	Partially signed as National Road 2
Kasindi–Beni–Butembo Road	134 kilometres (83 mi)	2019	2024 (Expected)	Partially signed as National Road 2
