= Bunagana–Rutshuru–Goma Road =

Road in the Democratic Republic of the Congo

Coordinates: 01°16′14″S 29°23′12″E

Route information
- Length: 55 mi (89 km)

Major junctions
- East end: Bunagana
- Bugani; Rutshuru; Rumangabo; Buhumba
- West end: Goma

Location

Highway system
- Transport in

The Bunagana–Rutshuru–Goma Road in Uganda and the Democratic Republic of the Congo (DRC), connects the towns of Bunagana in Uganda with the similarly named Bunagana in DRC. The road also connects these two towns to Bugani, Rutshuru, Rumangabo, Buhumba and Goma, all in DRC.

== Location ==
The eastern end of this road is in Bunagana, Uganda, at the international border with DRCongo. The road travels in a general north-westerly direction, through the towns of Bunagana, DRCongo, Bugani to Rutshuru. At Rutshuru, the road joins National Road 2, and turns southwestwards and passes through Rumangabo and Buhumba, to end at Goma, a total distance of approximately 90 kilometres (56 mi).

== Overview ==
This road is an important transport corridor between Uganda and the Democratic Republics of the Congo. It is expected to boost Uganda's trade with DRC, in agricultural and manufactured products, including refined petroleum products, as Uganda enters the oil-production phase.

== Upgrades and reconstruction ==
Before 2019, the road was gravel surfaced, in various stages of disrepair. In November 2019, Yoweri Museveni of Uganda and Félix Tshisekedi of the Democratic Republic of the Congo signed agreements in Entebbe, Uganda, to upgrade this road to bituminous surface, within twenty-four months, after the relevant ministers have agreed on implementation details.

In October 2020, the Cabinet of Uganda resolved to participate in the upgrading and paving up to 223 kilometres (139 mi) of roads in the DRC to the tune of 20 percent of the cost. The government of the DRC would be responsible for the remaining 80 percent of the cost. The two roads involved are: 1. the 134 kilometres (83 mi) Kasindi–Beni–Butembo Road and 2. the 90 kilometres (56 mi) Bunagana–Rutshuru–Goma Road.

Uganda's Minister of Works and Transport revealed that Uganda would contribute US$65.9 million (USh246 billion) as its investment towards the improvements to the two roads, measuring 223 kilometres (139 mi). The total cost of renovation and improvement is budgeted at US$334.3 million (UShs1.2 trillion). It is expected that after the road improvement, Uganda's exports to DR Congo will double, from the current $532 million (USh1.9 trillion) annually to $1.064 billion (USh3.8 trillion).

On 27 May 2021, the Deputy Prime Minister of DR Congo, Christophe Lutundula Apala, visited Uganda "to sign a key inter-governmental agreement on infrastructure", involving this and other roads.

== See also ==
- List of roads in the Democratic Republic of the Congo
- List of roads in Uganda
