= Kasindi–Beni–Butembo Road =

Road in the Democratic Republic of the Congo

Coordinates: 00°27′13″N 29°25′48″E

Route information
- Length: 83 mi (134 km)

Major junctions
- East end: Kasindi
- Beni
- West end: Butembo

Location

Highway system
- Transport in

Kasindi–Beni–Butembo Road, is a road in the Democratic Republic of the Congo, connecting the towns of Kasindi, Beni and Butembo. The road allows interconnection between Uganda and DR Congo, facilitating trade, human interaction and enhancing joint security across the common border.

== Location ==
The eastern end of this road is in the town of Kasindi, DRC, adjacent to the town of Mpondwe, Uganda, at the international border between the two countries. From there, the road travels in a general northwesterly direction for approximately 80 kilometres (50 mi), to the town of Beni. From Beni the road joins the National Road 2 and makes its way in a southwesterly direction for approximately 55 kilometres (34 mi), to Butembo. The entire road, from end to end, measures approximately 134 kilometres (83 mi).

== Overview ==
This road is an important transport corridor between Uganda and the Democratic Republics of the Congo. It is expected to boost Uganda's trade with DRC, in agricultural and manufactured products, including refined petroleum products, as Uganda enters the oil-production phase. Uganda sells cement, sugar, electricity and beverages to DRC. DRC, in exchange sells timber, kitenge and gold to Uganda.

== Upgrades and reconstruction ==
Before 2019, the road was gravel surfaced, in various stages of disrepair. In November 2019, Yoweri Museveni of Uganda and Félix Tshisekedi of the Democratic Republic of the Congo signed agreements in Entebbe, Uganda, to upgrade this road to bituminous surface, within twenty-four months, after the relevant ministers have agreed on implementation details.

In October 2020, the Cabinet of Uganda resolved to participate in the upgrading and paving up to 223 kilometres (139 mi) of roads in the DRC to the tune of 20 percent of the cost. The government of the DRC would be responsible for the remaining 80 percent of the cost. The two roads involved are: 1. the 134 kilometres (83 mi) Kasindi–Beni–Butembo Road and 2. the 90 kilometres (56 mi) Bunagana–Rutshuru–Goma Road.

Katumba Wamala, Uganda's Minister of Works and Transport indicated that Uganda would contribute US$65.9 million towards the improvements to the two roads, measuring 223 kilometres (139 mi). The total cost of improving and upgrading the two roads is budgeted at US$334.3 million. It is expected that after the road improvements, Uganda's exports to DR Congo will double, from the current $532 million (USh1.96 trillion) annually to $1.064 billion (USh3.92 trillion).

In May 2021, the Deputy Prime Minister of DRC visited Uganda to sign a key infrastructure agreement with the Ugandan authorities, involving this road.

In March 2022, commencement of the improvement of this road was jointly commissioned by Major General Kayanja Muhanga of the Uganda People's Defence Force (UPDF) and Major General Bombelle Camille Ehola of the Armed Forces of the Democratic Republic of the Congo (FADRC).

== Associated infrastructure ==
As of October 2021, the two neighboring countries are also working on these three other roads (a) the Nebbi-Goli-Mahagi-Bunia Road, measuring about 190 kilometres (118 mi) (b) the Bunia-Bogoro-Kasenyi Road, measuring 55 kilometres (34 mi) and (c) the 49 kilometres (30 mi) Rwebisengo-Budiba-Buguma-Njiyapada Road. It is expected that work on this group of roads will start after completion of the first group.

== See also ==
- List of roads in the Democratic Republic of the Congo
- List of roads in Uganda
