= Ntoroko clashes =

Armed clash in Uganda

- Part of Allied Democratic Forces insurgency
Date	13 December 2022
Location	Bweramule sub-county, Ntoroko District, Uganda
Result	Ugandan victory

Belligerents
Uganda	Allied Democratic Forces

Commanders and leaders
Dick Olum; Saul Nabimanya	Unknown

Strength
Unknown	~40

Casualties and losses
1 killed 2 injured	26 killed 22 captured
- 3 civilians killed 8,000 people displaced

On 13 December 2022, fighting broke out between the Uganda People's Defence Force and the Allied Democratic Forces in Ntoroko District, in western Uganda.

== Prelude ==
In the 1990s, the Islamist group Allied Democratic Forces formed in southern Uganda, and quickly took hold in eastern Congo and the dense rainforests there, launching attacks on civilians and Congolese forces. However, the group has made several incursions into the Ugandan border in the late 2010s and early 2020s, as their influence grew in the Congo. In late 2021, the Ugandan Army dispatched to eastern Congo to aid the Congolese and Rwandan militaries in relieving the Kivu and Ituri conflicts. Incursions by the ADF into Uganda, however, occasionally happened, along with attacks in the Ugandan capital of Kampala.

== Battle ==
Civilians in Bweramule sub-county, in Ntoroko, first spotted ADF militants on 13 December. Speaking to the Ugandan military, they stated around 20-40 militants crossed the Semuliki river into the district. The fighters were armed with around 15-20 guns. Captured ADF fighters stated that once they crossed into Ntoroko, the ADF contingent was split into several groups. Meanwhile, the Ugandan military's 8th Mountain Battalion, stationed in the area, responded to the incursion. The ADF attacked civilians in Bweramule, killing three people. In the ensuing clashes between Ugandan forces and the ADF, seventeen ADF fighters were killed and thirteen were captured, mostly child soldiers. The commander of the Ugandan Mountain Division, Dick Olum, stated the other ten fighters likely drowned in the Semuliki river when crossing back. In the clashes, one Ugandan soldier was killed, and two were injured.

== Aftermath ==
By 14 December, civilians sheltering in the local public school were able to return home. Around 8,000 people were displaced in total from the attacks, 7,000 of which from Bweramule sub-county, and 1,000 combined from Butungama sub-county and Kibuuku town. On 25 December, seven more ADF fighters that were hiding were caught by civilians and military forces. All fighters were between the ages of 12 and 14.
