= Djugu =

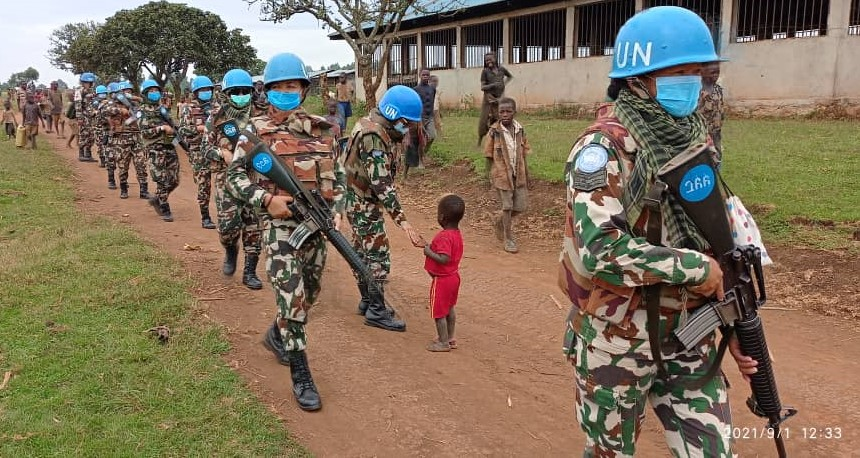
- MONUSCO Peace keepers in Djugu in 2021

- Location within Democratic Republic of the Congo
- Coordinates: 1.918365°N 30.501877°E
- Country: Democratic Republic of the Congo
- Province: Ituri Province
- Territory: Djugu Territory

Population (2012 estimate)
  - Total: 28,061
- Climate: Aw
- National language: Swahili

Djugu is a town in the Ituri Province of the Democratic Republic of the Congo. It is the administrative headquarters of Djugu Territory. As of 2012 the population was estimated at 28,061.
