= Kyanika =

Ugandan town

- Map of Uganda showing the location of Kyanika
- Coordinates: 01°20′20″S 29°44′20″E
- Region: Western Region
- Districts: Kisoro District
- Elevation: 1,953 m (6,407 ft)
- Time zone: UTC+3 (EAT)

Kyanika is a settlement in Kisoro District in the Western Region of Uganda.

== Location ==
Kyanika is in Kisoro District, Kigezi sub-region. The town sits adjacent to Cyanika, across Uganda's international border with Rwanda. The town is approximately 10 kilometres (6 mi), south-east of the town of Kisoro, where the district headquarters are located.

The settlement is approximately 490 kilometres (304 mi), by road, southwest of Kampala, Uganda's capital and largest city. The coordinates of Kyanika, Uganda are 1°20'20.0"S, 29°44'20.0"E (Latitude:-1.338889; Longitude:29.738889). The town sits at an average elevation of 1,953 metres (6,407 ft) above sea level.

== Overview ==
Immediately south of Kyanika, across the Rwandan border, is the town of Cyanika. The Kyanika/Cyanika border crossing is an important transit point between the two countries. The other two major road crossings are Katuna/Gatuna and Mirama Hills/Kagitumba.

== Points of interest ==
The following additional points of interest lie within or close to the town limits: (a) the offices of Kyanika Town Council (b) Kyanika central market (c) Kabale–Kisoro–Bunagana Road: The 10.6 kilometres (7 mi) southern extension of this road, from Kisoro to Kyanika, ends here.

== See also ==
- Uganda Revenue Authority
- List of cities and towns in Uganda
- List of roads in Uganda
