= Muhammad Kirumira =

Ugandan police commander and activist

- Born: May 20, 1983; Uganda
- Died: September 8, 2018 (aged 35); Bulenga, Wakiso District, Uganda
- Burial place: Mpigi District, Uganda
- Education: Bachelor of Education (First Class)
- Alma mater: Kyambogo University
- Occupations: Police officer, teacher, human rights activist
- Years active: 2005–2018
- Employer: Uganda Police Force

Muhammad Kirumira (May 20, 1983 – September 8, 2018) was a Ugandan senior police commander, a teacher by profession and a human rights activist, assassinated soon after his public declaration of quitting the Uganda Police Force for its excessive and illegal use of power. In 2017, he rejected charges for allegations that he was involved in promoting bribery, which was later discovered false and thus promised the revenge. By the time of his death, he had announced a contest on an unidentified political position in 2021 general elections.

== Personal life and responsibilities ==
Kirumira was born on May 20, 1983, by Hajji Abubaker Kawooya and Sarah Namuddu. He graduated from Kyambogo University with a first-class Bachelor's Degree in Education. He also attended Nkozi National Teachers' College where he attained a Diploma in Education. Aged 22 on January 29, 2005, he joined the Police. However, he was soon reverted to Kabalye Training School – Masindi for more training. In 2007, he was sent to Kibaale District as a constable and in 2008 to Kampala as a detective. Following his misunderstandings with the then bosses, he went to Kaliro District in 2009, also as a detective at local police stations. He was then promoted to assistant inspector of police and went back for training at Uganda Junior Staff College for six months. At the completion, he in 2015, became the inspector of police. A year after (2016), he became an Assistant Superintendent of Police as well as Division police commander at Old Kampala. He gained fame during his televised tactics in fighting robbery. But in 2017, allegations emerged that he involved in accepting bribes especially between 2013 and 2014. He was taken to court although journalists were denied access in, which he later explained as desires of defamation from his fellow top officers and refused to pay the charges.

== His death ==
A few months after being assigned as Buyende District Commander, Kirumira resigned from Police service in February 2018, and a series of times, announced attempts of being murdered. He showed support and took pictures with a Ugandan opposition leader, Robert Kyagulanyi aka Bobi Wine. He declared an interest in entering politics. At around 9 p.m. on September 8, 2018, while on his way back home in Bulenga, Kirumira was shot by gunmen on a motorbike. He was rushed to Rubaga Hospital and died on arrival. Investigations did not take place until four years later, in 2022. The information was spread, originating from Kirumira's close people that there was a hand of his 12-year serving boss, Gen. Kale Kayihura who was later sanctioned by the United States. However, the police reported that the suspect, Abdul Kateregga, 40, died before releasing an exhibit of the killer gun. Muhammad Kirumira was buried in Mpigi, and left 8 widows including Mariam Kirumira and 25 children who were announced after.

== See also ==
- Uganda National Police
- List of military schools in Uganda
- Kale Kayihura
