= Tororo Rock =

Mountain in Uganda

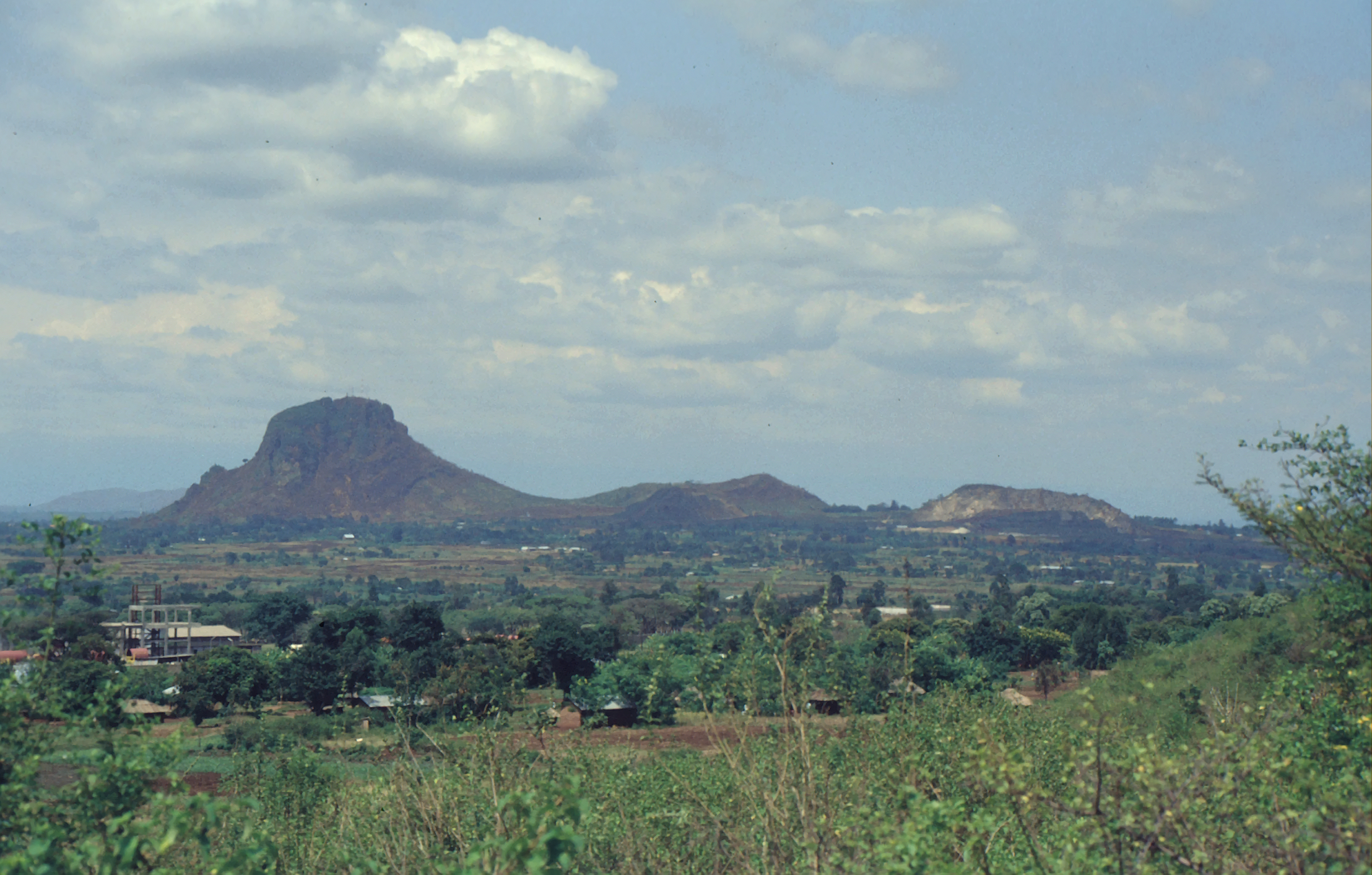

Highest point
- Elevation: 4,865 ft (1,483 m)
- Prominence: 676 ft (206 m)
- Coordinates: 00°41′06″N 34°11′01″E

Geography
- Location within Uganda
- Location: Tororo, Tororo District, Uganda

Geology
- Mountain type: Volcanic plug

Tororo Rock is a rock formation located in the town of Tororo in the Eastern Region of Uganda.

It serves as the defining feature of the town. It is also a tourist attraction being climbable in around an hour. The climb involves four ladders up the last sections but the walk does not require any skill. A tour guide is recommended and a small fee is charged to non-nationals (USh 10,000 per person or approximately US$2.75), as of December 2017. On top of the hill is a radio mast and accompanying power substation. Also at the summit are cell towers belonging to the leading telecommunication network companies operating in Uganda, including Airtel Uganda, MTN Uganda and Uganda Telecom. There is also a closed down cable car that has remained unused for a number of years.

== Location ==
The rock is situated approximately 5 kilometres (3 mi) southeast of the central business district of the town. The coordinates of the rock are:00 41 06N, 34 11 01E (Latitude:0.6850; Longitude:34.1836).

== Overview ==
It is reported that Tororo Rock is visible from anywhere in Tororo District. There is saying in Tororo: "The Eiffel Tower is to Paris as the magnificent Tororo Rock is to Tororo District". The rock is a major tourist attraction.

== Elevation ==
The highest altitude of Tororo Rock is 4,865 feet (1,483 m) with a gradient of about 0.75 from the east to the west. On the rock's slopes are ancestral caves and various rock paintings. The elevation of Tororo Town averages 4,189 feet (1,277 m). Therefore, Tororo Rock towers 676 feet (206 m) above downtown Tororo.

== See also ==
- Tororo
- Tororo District
