= Kasindi church bombing =

2023 terrorist attack in the Democratic Republic of the Congo

- Part of the ADF insurgency
- Location: 00°02′52″N 29°41′11″E; Kasindi, North Kivu, DR Congo
- Date: 15 January 2023
- Target: Pentecostal church
- Attack type: Bombing
- Deaths: 17
- Injuries: 39
- Perpetrators: ISIL: IS-CAP; ADF-Baluku

On 15 January 2023, a bomb exploded during a Sunday service in a Pentecostal church in the Democratic Republic of the Congo (DRC). The attack occurred in Kasindi in the northeastern province of North Kivu, close to the Ugandan border. The attack killed at least 17 people and left 39 more were injured. The Islamic State – Central Africa Province (IS-CAP) claimed responsibility for the attack.

== Background ==
Following the radicalization of its founding leader, Jamil Mukulu, the ADF was formed as a merger of several rebel groups (initially called ADF/NALU) in 1995. The ADF initially operated in western Uganda but has since, and currently continues to operate solely in the eastern DRC; this includes the North Kivu and Ituri Provinces.

The ADF's leadership shifted after the imprisonment of Mukulu on 30 April 2015. Musa Seka Baluku, Mukulu's second-in-command since the group's formation, stepped forward in his place shortly after. Under Baluku's leadership, the group made contact with the Islamic State (IS) as early as 2017, were formally recognized as a chapter of IS–Central Africa Province (IS-CAP) in 2018, and formally pledged their allegiance to the IS in 2019. By that year, the ADF had split, with one part remaining loyal to Mukulu and the other to Baluku; the latter renewed their allegiance to the IS in April 2022. Since joining IS-CAP, the ADF increasingly targeted civilians into their attacks.

In response to growing causalities at the hands of the ADF, the Congolese and Ugandan armed forces created a joint military force called Operation Shujaa in November 2021. The Operation's already mixed perception, due to views of Uganda's role in the Second Congo War, was further put into question regarding its effectiveness in actually preventing ADF attacks.

== Aftermath and reactions ==
Authorities in the DRC blamed the Allied Democratic Forces (ADF), a Ugandan Islamist group whose insurgency began in 1996 and spread to the DRC; the group has pledged allegiance to the Islamic State. A Kenyan national was arrested at the scene.

=== Religious institutions ===
Pope Francis sent his condolences to the victims of the bombing ahead of his scheduled visit to the DRC in 2023. Peter Mathuki, then-Secretary General of the East African Community (EAC), condemned the " horrific attack on worshippers" in a statement. The government of France issued a condemnation of the attacks, stating it "expresses its full solidarity with the Congolese people at this difficult time".
