= Tororo =

Town in the Eastern Region of Uganda

- Town
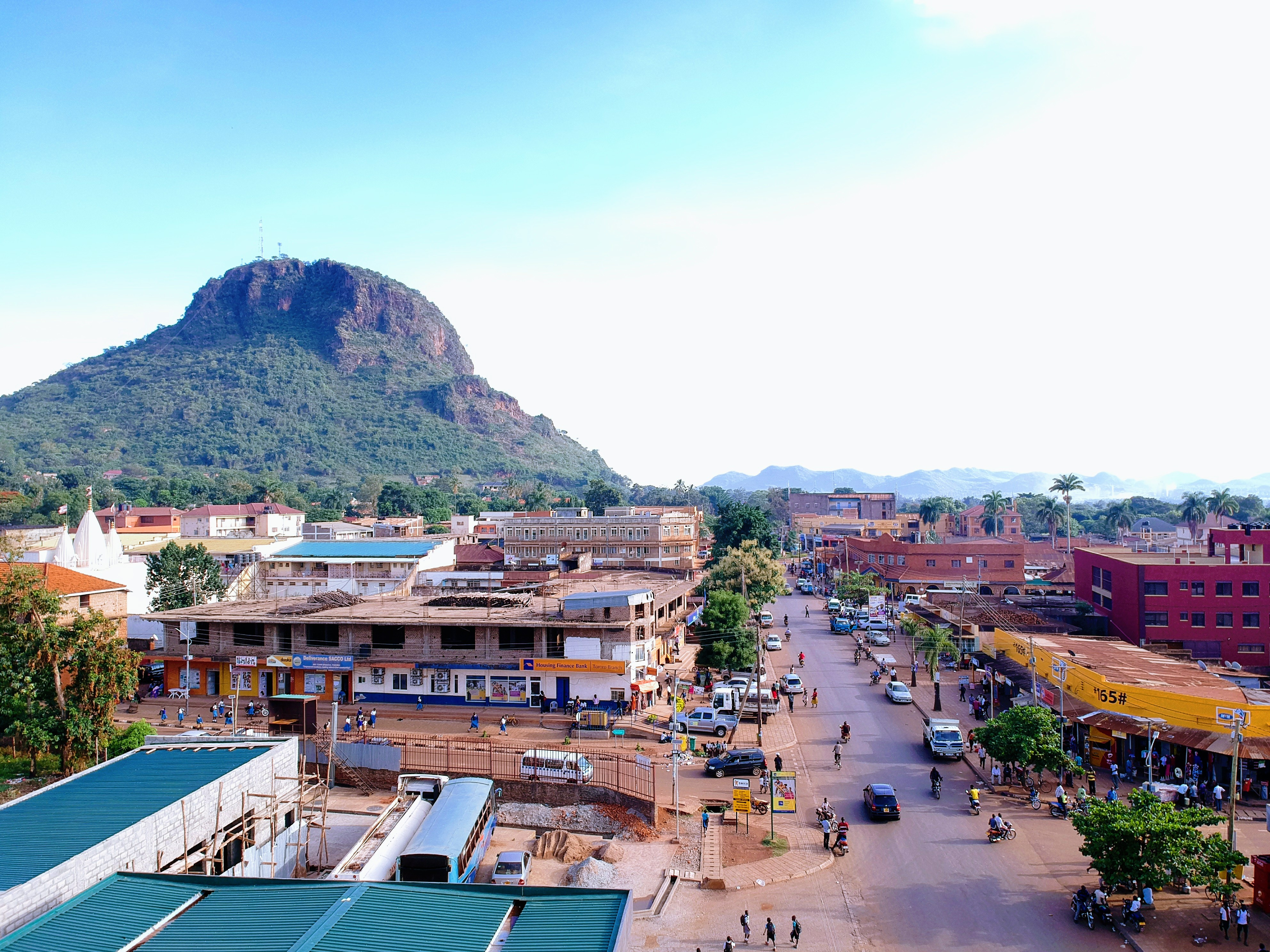
- Tororo town

- Location in Uganda
- Coordinates: 00°41′34″N 34°10′54″E
- Country: Uganda
- Region: Eastern Region of Uganda
- District: Tororo District
- Elevation: 4,193 ft (1,278 m)

Population (2024 Census)
  - Total: 42,865

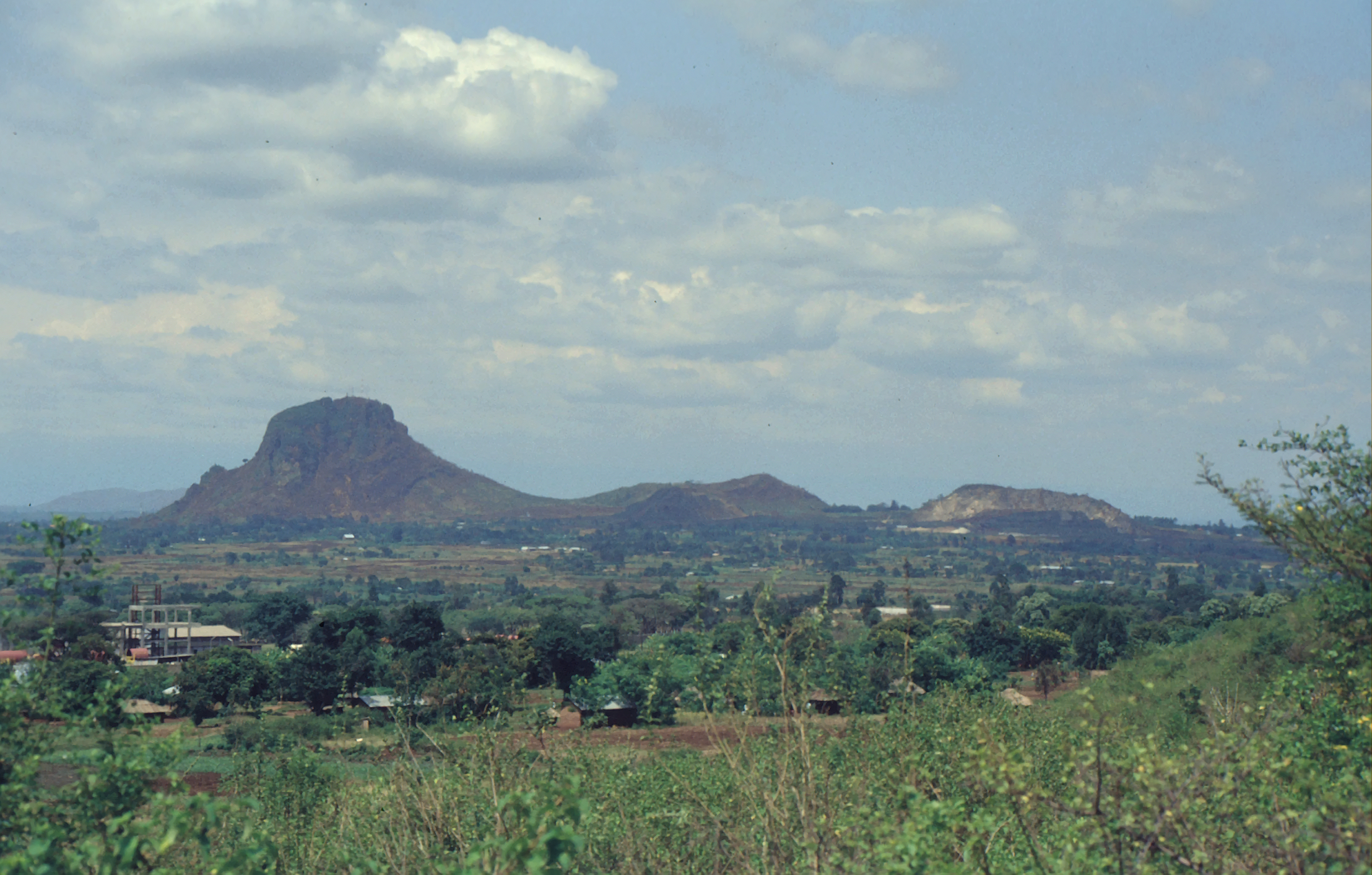
Tororo rock

Tororo is a town in the Eastern Region of Uganda. It is the main municipal, administrative, and commercial center of Tororo District.

== History ==
Tororo was garrisoned by the Uganda Army's Air and Sea Battalion during the Uganda–Tanzania War (1978–79). On 2 March 1979, rebels loyal to Milton Obote attacked the town, whereupon part of the garrison defected while the rest was routed. Tororo was recaptured by the Uganda Army in a counterattack two days later; many local civilians were displaced by the fighting. A few weeks later, however, Ugandan President Idi Amin's rule throughout Uganda collapsed and the garrison of Tororo reportedly mutinied yet again. In late April 1979, the Tanzania People's Defence Force's (TPDF) 19th Battalion, 208th Brigade, moved into Tororo. They encountered no resistance. The town was largely deserted and completely looted. Journalists Tony Avirgan and Martha Honey stated that the local UA garrison had fled the city, whereas Tom Cooper and Adrien Fontanellaz claimed that the mutinous troops helped the anti-Amin forces to secure the town.

Tororo was captured by the National Resistance Army from the Uganda National Liberation Army (UNLA) in early February 1986 during the Ugandan Bush War. The UNLA counter-attacked in an attempt to retake Tororo and turn the tide in the war, but was repelled.

== Geography ==
The town is approximately 10 kilometres (6.2 mi) west of the town of Malaba at the border between Uganda and Kenya. This is approximately 209 kilometres (130 mi), by road, east of Kampala, Uganda's capital and largest city. The geographical coordinates of the town are 0°41'34.0"N, 34°10'54.0"E (Latitude:0.692780; Longitude:34.181655). Tororo town lies at an average elevation of 1,278 metres (4,193 ft) above sea level.

=== Climate ===
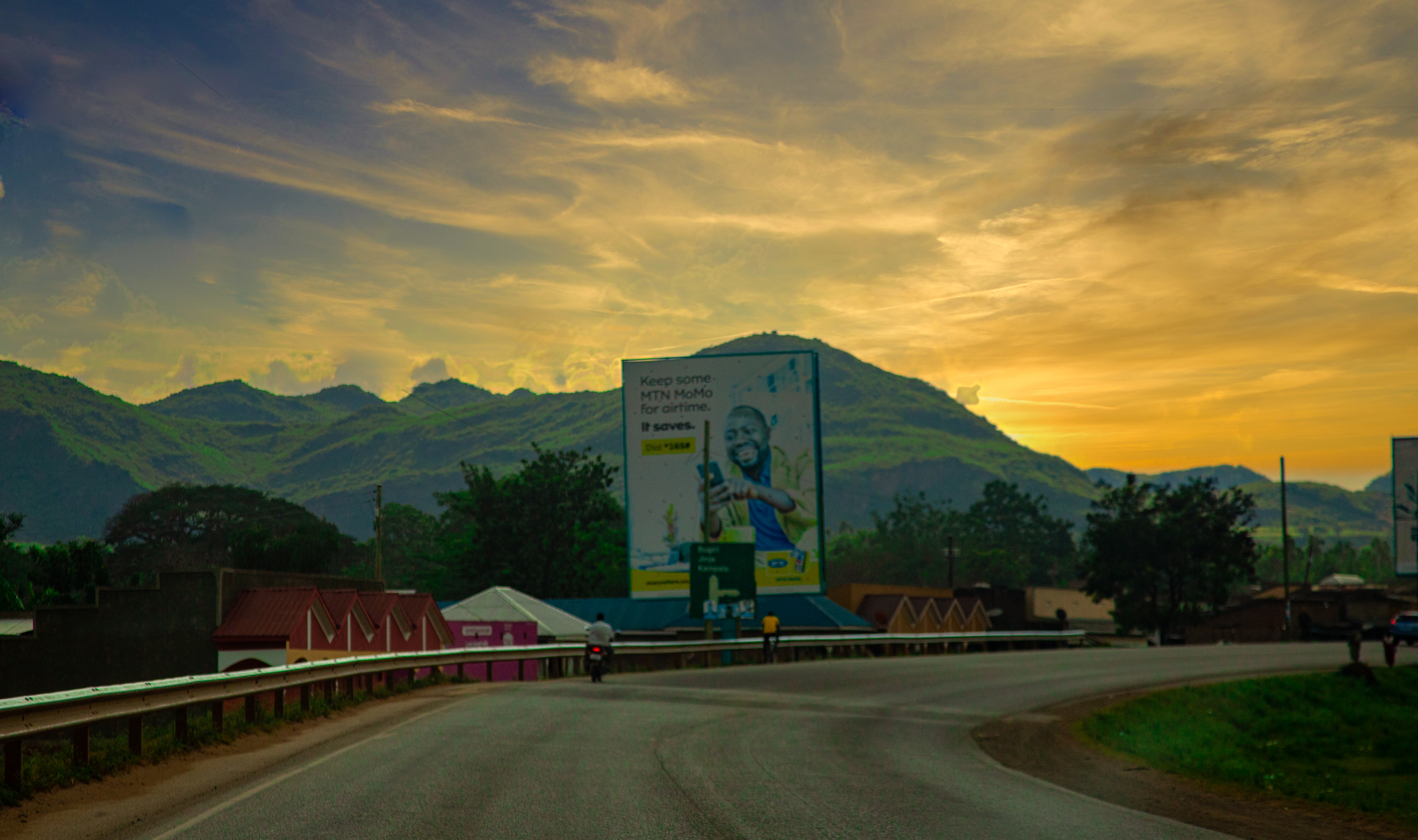
Sunset time in tororo

Tororo has a tropical monsoon climate with a short dry season. The average annual temperature is 22.4 °C (72.3 °F) (average high 28.7 °C (83.7 °F) and average low 16.2 °C (61.2 °F)). Average annual precipitation is 1,494 millimetres (58.8 in). Tororo has many thunderstorms and may be the place where thunder occurs on more days than any other place on Earth. From September to December there is rain most days in the late afternoon. The drier and hotter season starts in December.

Climate data for Tororo (1961–1990)
Month	Jan	Feb	Mar	Apr	May	Jun	Jul	Aug	Sep	Oct	Nov	Dec	Year
Mean daily maximum °C (°F)	30.6 (87.1)	30.7 (87.3)	30.3 (86.5)	28.9 (84.0)	28.3 (82.9)	27.9 (82.2)	27.5 (81.5)	28.0 (82.4)	28.8 (83.8)	29.2 (84.6)	28.8 (83.8)	29.9 (85.8)	29.1 (84.3)
Mean daily minimum °C (°F)	15.8 (60.4)	16.5 (61.7)	16.8 (62.2)	17.1 (62.8)	16.7 (62.1)	16.0 (60.8)	15.8 (60.4)	15.6 (60.1)	15.6 (60.1)	16.0 (60.8)	16.0 (60.8)	15.6 (60.1)	16.1 (61.0)
Average rainfall mm (inches)	59.0 (2.32)	77.0 (3.03)	139.0 (5.47)	223.0 (8.78)	214.0 (8.43)	110.0 (4.33)	91.0 (3.58)	114.0 (4.49)	115.0 (4.53)	134.0 (5.28)	123.0 (4.84)	74.0 (2.91)	1,473 (57.99)
Average rainy days (≥ 1.0 mm)	5.8	8.0	11.4	15.8	17.2	10.9	9.2	10.9	10.8	13.5	12.5	7.2	133.2
Source: World Meteorological Organization

== Population ==
In 2002, the national census put the population of the town of Tororo at 34,810. In 2010, the Uganda Bureau of Statistics (UBOS) estimated the population at 42,500. In 2011, UBOS estimated the mid-year population at 43,700. The 2014 national population census put the population at 41,906.

In 2015, the population of the town was projected at 43,100. In 2020, the mid-year population of Tororo Town was projected at 48,500. It was calculated that the population of this municipality grew at an average annual rate of 2.5 percent, between 2015 and 2020.

Historical population
Year	Pop.	±%
2002	34,800	—
2010	42,500	+22.1%
2011	43,700	+2.8%
2014	41,906	−4.1%
2015	42,800	+2.1%
2020	48,500	+13.3%

== Industry ==
Tororo is home to three cement factories thus making Tororo the biggest producer of cement in the country. Tororo Cement Limited is the largest cement producer with 3 million tons produced annually. Tororo cement also produces nails, iron sheets, wire mesh among others.

Larfage has also established their Hima Cement factory in Tororo producing a variety of cement brands.

Tororo has National cement company Uganda Limited (Simba brand), inaugurated in August 2018 and producing 2000 metric tonnes daily.

It is also home to SEBA Foods, a food factory that was officially opened by the president of Uganda on 25 June 2010.

Electromaxx Limited constructed a 20 megawatt thermal plant, Tororo Power Station, which was commissioned in June 2010.

Tororo is also the location of Nilefos Minerals Limited, a subsidiary of the Madhvani Group of companies. Nilefos mines and processes phosphates for use in fertilizer and related industries.

== Rail transport ==
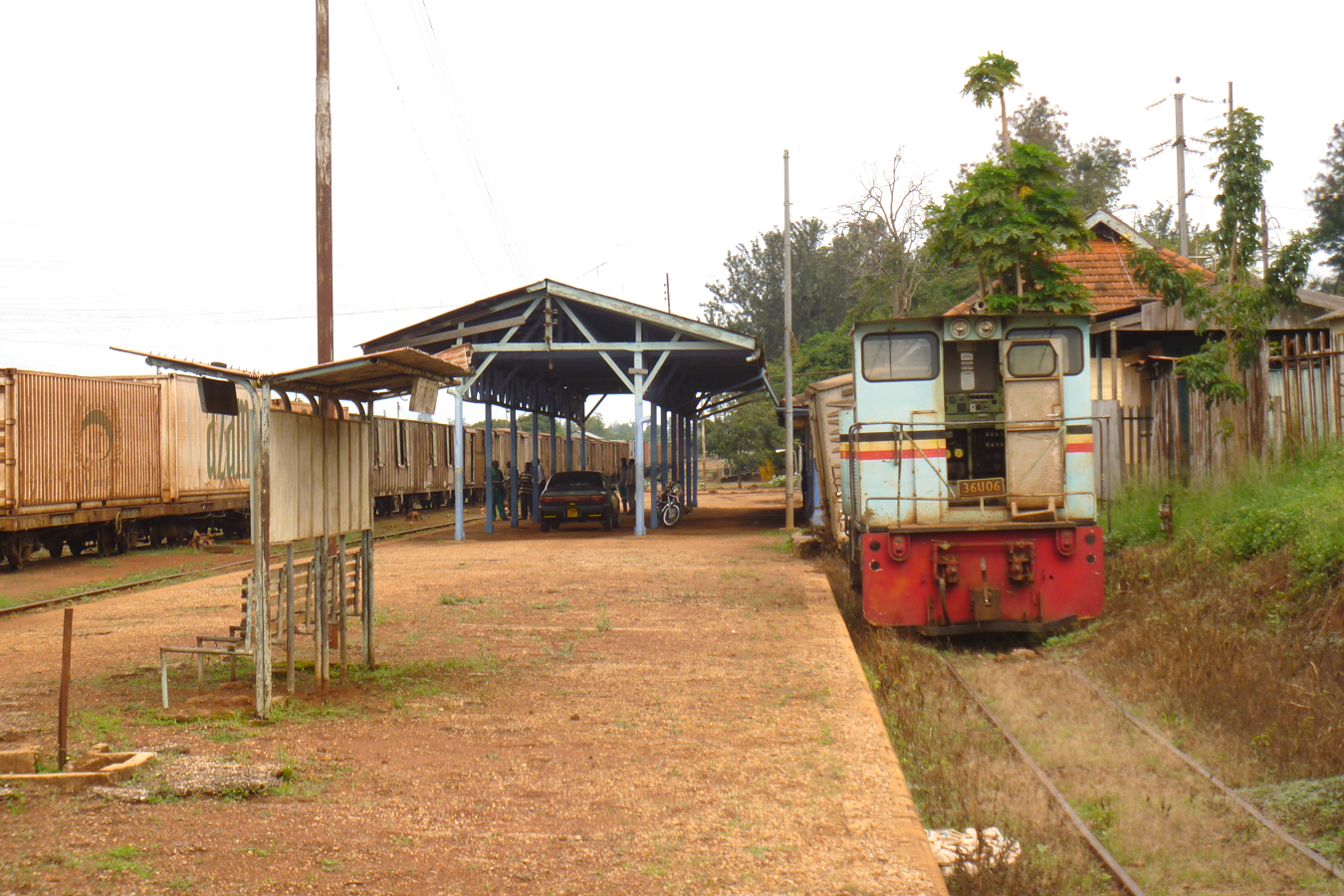
Tororo railway station on the Uganda Railway.

Tororo marks the junction of railway lines to Pakwach, via Soroti, and to Kasese, via Kampala. Since 1993, the metre gauge line from Tororo Junction to Gulu and Pakwach has been out of use.

Rift Valley Railways funded the clearing of the line east to Gulu of vegetation and repairing track and bridges, thus allowing the first commercial train for 20 years to run through on the metre gauge track from the Kenyan port of Mombasa through Nairobi and Eldoret to the Kenyan frontier in Tororo and onwards to Gulu on the line to Pakwach on 14 September 2013.

== Points of interest ==
The following additional points of interest lie within the town limits or near its edges:

1. The tourist attraction of the town is the dominating rock outcrop that overlooks the town known as Tororo Rock. It is a hike that takes around an hour to the top. There used to be a cable car that took people to the top but this was closed down after a couple of people died in an accident. There is a fee for a tour guide at the bottom of the rock, just off the golf course.

2. There is a golf course in town with a clubhouse with a pool

3. Offices of Tororo Town Council

4. The Tororo central market was knocked down in September 2017, to make way for a new indoor shopping centre that was predicted to be finished in 2020. This has led to a new market starting nearby in Water Village.

5. Tororo General Hospital, a 200-bed public hospital administered by the Uganda Ministry of Health.

6. Uganda Martyrs' Cathedral, the seat of the archbishop of the Roman Catholic Archdiocese of Tororo

7. St. Anthony's Hospital (Uganda), a 150-bed mission hospital affiliated with the Roman Catholic Archdiocese of Tororo

8. Christ the King Priory, a Benedictine monastery of the Congregation of Missionary Benedictines of Saint Ottilien

9. Tororo–Mbale–Soroti Road begins here and continues in a northwesterly direction, to end 158 kilometres (98 mi) away at Soroti.

10. Tororo Airport, a public airport administered by the Civil Aviation Authority of Uganda

11. Tororo Solar Power Station

12. Busitema University, one of the public universities in Uganda, located 28 kilometres (17 mi), by road, southwest of the central business district of Tororo town.

13. A mobile branch of PostBank Uganda

14. Branch of the National Social Security Fund.

== See also ==
- Railway stations in Uganda
- Transport in Uganda
- Uganda Salvation Front
- List of cities and towns in Uganda
