= Bwera General Hospital =

- Uganda Ministry of Health

Geography
- Location: Bwera, Kasese District, Western Region, Uganda
- Coordinates: 00°02′02″N 29°46′01″E

Organisation
- Care system: Public
- Type: General

Services
- Emergency department: I
- Beds: 100

History
- Founded: 2000

Links
- Other links: Hospitals in Uganda

Bwera General Hospital, also Bwera Hospital, is a hospital in the Western Region of Uganda.

== Location ==
The hospital is located in the town of Bwera, in Kasese District, near the international border with DR Congo, approximately 132 kilometres (82 mi) southwest of Fort Portal Regional Referral Hospital. This is about 167 kilometres (104 mi) northwest of Mbarara Regional Referral Hospital. The coordinates of Bwera General Hospital are: 0°02'02.0"N, 29°46'01.0"E (Latitude:0.033899; Longitude:29.766934).

== Overview ==
Bwera General Hospital is a public hospital owned by the Uganda Ministry of Health. It serves the surrounding sub-counties in Kasese District, and patients from neighboring Democratic Republic of the Congo. It is the only government-owned hospital in Kasese District, as of May 2016. The hospital's bed capacity is 100, although many times it admits up to 300.

Like most government hospitals in the country, Bwera General Hospital faces many challenges including non-functioning equipment, under-staffing, poor funding, over-worked staff and slow payment of staff.

== Ebola ==
The hospital has an Ebola treatment unit which treated patients in June 2019 during the 2018–20 Kivu Ebola epidemic affecting neighbouring Democratic Republic of Congo.

== See also ==
- List of hospitals in Uganda
