= Lay Mission-Helpers Association =

Foundation for lay Catholic missionaries

The Lay Mission-Helpers Association (LMH) is a U.S.-based Catholic missionary order founded in 1955 by Monsignor Anthony Brouwers. LMH provides training and support for lay Catholics to serve in international mission dioceses as teachers, nurses, or other professionals. Catholic doctors admitted into the Mission Doctors Association (MDA), a sister organization of LMH, serve Africa and Latin America. Collectively, LMH and MDA have sent over 750 men, women, and families to perform missionary work in 36 countries.
