= Uganda Salvation Front =

Rebel group in Uganda

- Active: 1999–2006
- Country: Uganda
- Allegiance: Anti-government
- Branch: Rebel group
- Type: Insurgent organization
- Role: Armed resistance
- Size: Unknown
- Engagements: Northern Uganda conflict

The Uganda Salvation Front (USF) (alternately Uganda Salvation Army) was a rebel group that operated in northern Uganda from 1999 to 2006 as part of the broader insurgency against the government of President Yoweri Museveni. The organization emerged during a period of intense conflict in northern Uganda, contributing to the complex web of armed groups that plagued the region during the late 1990s and early 2000s.

The group conducted several notable operations during its existence, including a 1998 attack on Tororo Prison where they abducted several inmates, demonstrating their capacity for coordinated military actions beyond their northern Uganda base of operations. The USF's activities were part of the larger pattern of insurgency that characterized northern Uganda during this period, as various groups emerged from or split off from existing rebel organizations.

The Uganda Salvation Front operated within the broader context of the northern Uganda conflict, which involved multiple rebel groups, government forces, and civilian populations caught in the crossfire. Unlike some other rebel groups in the region, the USF maintained a relatively small profile and conducted limited operations compared to larger organizations like the LRA. The group's formation represented the fragmentation that occurred within the northern Uganda resistance movement as different factions pursued varying strategies and maintained different relationships with regional actors.

By 2006, the USF had ceased significant operations, likely due to a combination of military pressure from government forces, internal organizational challenges, and changing dynamics in the northern Uganda conflict. The group's dissolution coincided with broader efforts to resolve the northern Uganda conflict through peace negotiations and military campaigns against remaining rebel groups.

== Activities ==
- In 1998, the USF attacked Tororo Prison and abducted several inmates.
- In 1999, David Nyekorach-Matsanga, a senior official of the Lord's Resistance Army, announced his resignation. Matsanga stated that the LRA had become a tool of the Sudanese government, and that he would continue the fight to remove Ugandan President Yoweri Museveni with his own rebel group: the USF.

== Sources ==
- Uganda: Country Reports on Human Rights Practices - 1999 Bureau of Democracy, Human Rights and Labor, U.S. Department of State. February 2000*
