= Bunagana, Uganda =

- Location in Uganda
- Coordinates: 01°17′40″S 29°35′59″E
- Country: Uganda
- Region: Western Uganda
- Sub-region: Kigezi sub-region
- District: Kisoro District
- Elevation: 6,368 ft (1,941 m)

Bunagana is a town in the Western Region of Uganda. It sits across the international border from the similarly named town of Bunagana, Democratic Republic of the Congo.

== Location ==
The town is located in extreme southwestern Uganda, in Kisoro District, at the international border between Uganda and the Democratic Republic of the Congo (DRC). Bunagana is approximately 87 kilometres (54 mi), by road, west of Kabale, the largest city in the Kigezi sub-region.

This is approximately 13 kilometres (8 mi) west of Kisoro, the district headquarters. The coordinates of the town are:1°17'40.0"S, 29°35'59.0"E (Latitude:-1.294444; Longitude:29.599722). Bunagana, Uganda sits at an average altitude of 1,941 metres (6,368 ft) above mean sea level.

== Overview ==
Bunagana is a major crossing point, for both human and commercial traffic. On the Congolese side, a road leads to Goma, a city of approximately 600,000 people and the capital of North Kivu Province in the DRC. On the Ugandan side, Kabale, with a population estimated at about 54,000, lies to the east of Bunagana and is connected to it by an all-weather bitumen-surfaced road.

== Points of interest ==
The following additional points of interest lie within or close to the town limits: (a) the offices of Bunagana Town Council (b) Bunagana Central Market, the source of daily fresh produce (c) Bwindi National Park in Uganda is northeast of Bunagana, while Virunga National Park in the DRC is southwest of the town (d) the town of Bunagana, DRC is immediately west of Bunagana, Uganda, across the border with the DRC.

The 90 kilometres (56 mi) Bunagana–Rutshuru–Goma Road starts here and ends in Goma, DR Congo. The 101 kilometres (63 mi) Kabale–Kisoro–Bunagana Road ends here, having started in Kabale, Uganda.

On 12 March 2021, Ugandan authorities began the construction of a One Stop Border Post (OSBP), at Bunagana, with a budget of US$1.3 million.

== See also ==
- List of cities and towns in Uganda
