= Bunagana, Democratic Republic of the Congo =

Bunagana
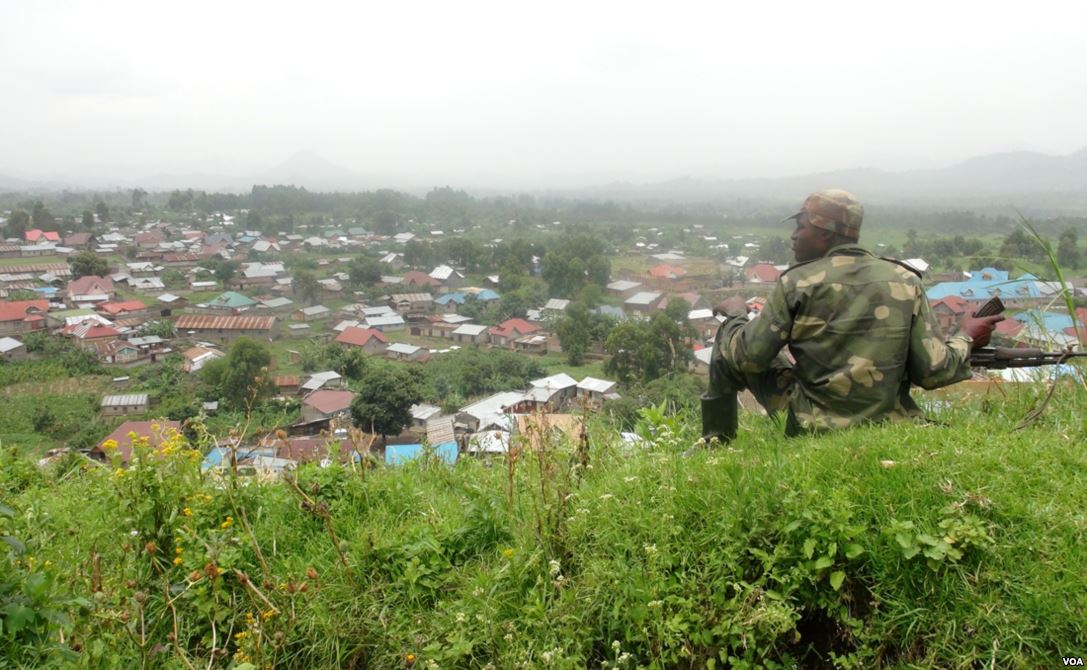
- An M23 rebel sits on a hill above Bunagana

- Location in DR Congo
- Coordinates: 01°18′00″S 29°35′42″E
- Country: DR Congo
- Province: North Kivu
- Territory: Rutshuru
- Elevation: 1,920 ft (590 m)
- Time zone: UTC+2 (Central Africa Time)
- Climate: Cwb

Bunagana is a small town in Rutshuru Territory, North Kivu Province, in eastern Democratic Republic of the Congo, at the border with Uganda. It served as the headquarters of the March 23 Movement (M23) rebel militia in 2013 and has been occupied by M23 since 13 June 2022.

As of 13 October 2022, the rebels had consolidated their control on the area surrounding the town. The Congolese border post was operating under rebel control with ongoing commercial exchanges with Uganda.

United States Senate Foreign Relations Committee Chair Bob Menendez has stated that “Rwandan support for M23 rebels who are attacking civilians, UN peacekeepers, and FARDC in Eastern DRC is unacceptable” and has called for Bureau of African Affairs to “immediately investigate and hold those responsible to account”

On 3 April 2023, AP reported that East African regional forces (EACRF), including a Ugandan contingent, had "regained" control of Bunagana. Ugandan contingent spokesman Capt. Kato Ahmad Hassan thanked the M23 rebels, saying “We appreciate the command of the M23 for being cooperative to the contingent, for according us a safe passage and for allowing us to occupy Bunagana.” However, the M23 continued to co-occupy Bunagana with the EACRF.

== Location ==
The town is located approximately 73 kilometres (45 mi), by road, northeast of Goma, the provincial capital.

== See also ==
- Bunagana, Uganda
- Goma
- North Kivu Province
- Virunga National Park
- M23 campaign (2022–present)
