= Kasindi =

Town in the DRC

- Location in Democratic Republic of the Congo
- Coordinates: 00°02′52″N 29°41′11″E
- Country: Democratic Republic of the Congo
- Province: North Kivu
- Territory: Beni Territory
- Time zone: UTC+2 (CAT)
- Climate: Af

Kasindi is a town in north-eastern Democratic Republic of Congo. It is located in the province of North Kivu.

== Location ==
Kasindi is located in North Kivu, about 77 kilometres (48 mi) southeast of the city of Beni, the nearest large city. This is approximately 283 kilometres (176 mi) north of the provincial capital of Goma. The coordinates of Kasindi are 0°02'52.0"N, 29°41'11.0"E (Latitude:0.047772; Longitude:29.686401). Kasindi sits at the international border with Uganda, directly across the town of Mpondwe, a distance of about 16 kilometres (10 mi).

== Overview ==
The Mpondwe-Kasindi border crossing is a busy transit point for people and trade merchandise. In 2005, it was the busiest cross border point for informal trade between Uganda and DR Congo, accounting for 25.0 percent of exports and 10.6 percent of imports for Uganda.

In 2012, the Mai Mai rebels attacked the towns of Kasindi and Lubiriha in DR Congo, causing hundreds of refugees to flee into Uganda. In 2023, Islamic State bombed a church, killing 17 people.
