= Mpondwe =

- Map of Uganda showing the location of Mpondwe.
- Coordinates: 00°02′24″N 29°43′30″E
- Country: Uganda
- Region: Western Region
- Sub-region: Rwenzururu sub-region
- District: Kasese District
- Elevation: 1,220 m (4,000 ft)

Population (2024 Census)
  - Total: 65,539
- Time zone: UTC+3 (EAT)

Mpondwe is a town in the Western Region of Uganda.

== History ==
In June 2023, the Lhubiriha secondary school in Mpondwe was attacked by militants linked to Islamic State group from the nearby Democratic Republic of the Congo. Around 40 people, mostly school boys were killed while several girls were abducted.

== Location ==
The town is at the border with the Democratic Republic of the Congo (DRC). Bwera is another settlement to the immediate east of the Mpondwe border crossing. The Mpondwe Town Council incorporates Bwera, and in this article "Mpondwe" refers to the combined "Mpondwe-Bwera" metropolitan area.

Mpondwe is approximately 55.5 kilometres (34 mi), by road, south-west of Kasese, where the district headquarters are located. This is about 131 kilometres (81 mi) southwest of Fort Portal, the nearest large city. Bwera is located approximately 424 kilometres (263 mi), by road, west of Kampala, Uganda's capital and largest city. The geographical coordinates of the town are 0° 02' 24.00"N, 29° 43' 30.00"E (Latitude:0.0400; Longitude:29.7250). The town sits at an average elevation of 1,220 metres (4,000 ft) above mean sea level.

== Overview ==
Mpondwe is one of the three busiest border crossings between Uganda and the Democratic Republic of the Congo. The other two are Goli, in Nebbi District and Bunagana, in Kisoro District. The town is the busiest border crossing between the two countries, based on volume of exports and imports.

== Population ==
In 2002, the national population census estimated the population of Mpondwe at 12,050. In 2010, the Uganda Bureau of Statistics (UBOS) estimated the population at 16,100. In 2011, UBOS estimated the mid-year population at 16,700. The national census in August 2014 put the population at 51,131.

In 2015, UBOS estimated the population of Mpondwe Municipality at 52,000. In 2020, the population agency estimated the mid-year population of the town at 58,600 people. Of these, 30,400 (51.9%) were females and 28,200 (48.1%) were males. UBOS calculated the annual population growth rate of Mpondwe to average 2.34% per year, between 2015 and 2020.

Historical population
Year	Pop.	±%
2002	12,050	—
2010	16,100	+33.6%
2011	16,700	+3.7%
2014	51,131	+206.2%
2015	52,000	+1.7%
2020	58,600	+12.7%

== One Stop Border Post ==
In March 2018, The Independent (Uganda) reported that the government of Uganda, had secured a loan of US$14 million (USh50.4 billion), to facilitate cross-border trade between Uganda and DR Congo. The Ugandan government, through the Uganda Ministry of Trade, Industry and Cooperatives and the Uganda Ministry of Works and Transport, in collaboration with other stakeholders plans to use the borrowed funds to construct a one-stop-border-post (OSBP) and a Border Export Zone (BEZ) at Mpondwe. Construction of the OSBP and BEZ was officially commissioned on Thursday 17 April 2019, by president Yoweri Museveni of Uganda. As of June 2022, completion of the OSBP and BEZ was estimated at 92%.

== Points of interest ==
The following points of interest lie within the town limits or close to the edges of town:

1. Offices of the Uganda Revenue Authority

2. Bwera General Hospital – A 120-bed public Hospital, administered by the Uganda Ministry of Health

3. Mpondwe Central Market

4. Offices of Mpondwe-Bwera Town Council

5. International border crossing between Uganda and the Democratic Republic of the Congo

6. Mpondwe Border Export Zone (In development).

7. The Mbarara–Kisangani Road crosses between Uganda and DRC at this location.

== Prominent people ==
- Crispus Kiyonga – Physician and politician. Current Ambassador to China and former Minister of Defence in the Cabinet of Uganda. He was born here and maintains a home in the area. He also served as the elected member of Parliament for this constituency.

== See also ==
- Rwenzururu
- Queen Elizabeth National Park
- List of cities and towns in Uganda
