= 2026 in the Democratic Republic of the Congo =

- Decades: 2000s; 2010s; 2020s
- See also: Other events of 2026; History of the DRC

Events of the year 2026 in the Democratic Republic of the Congo.

== Incumbents ==
- President: Félix Tshisekedi
- Prime Minister: Judith Suminwa

== Events ==
=== January ===
- 2 January –
  - Allied Democratic Forces (ADF) rebels kill at least 16 people during overnight attacks on the villages of Kilonge, Katanga, and Maendeleo in Lubero Territory, North Kivu.
  - The DRC assumes a two-year non-permanent seat at the United Nations Security Council for the first time since 1991.
  - M23 rebels accuse the FARDC of carrying out a drone strike that killed 22 people in Masisi Territory, North Kivu.
- 13 January – At least 13 people are killed while 30 others are reported missing following a landslide in Burutsi, North Kivu.
- 18 January – The FARDC retakes Uvira in South Kivu following M23's withdrawal.
- 25 January – At least 25 people are killed in separate attacks on Apakulu and Walese Vonkutu in Ituri.
- 28 January – More than 400 people are killed in a landslide at the Rubaya mines in North Kivu.

=== February ===
- 1 February – The Congo River Alliance and M23 carry out a drone attack on Kisangani Airport.
- 7 February – South Africa announces the withdrawal of its military contingent from MONUSCO.
- 8 February – The ADF kills 66 people in an attack on Irumu, North Kivu.
- 23 February – The Kavimvira border crossing between the DRC and Burundi reopens following a two-month closure caused by M23 offensives.
- 24 February – Willy Ngoma, the spokesperson of M23, is killed in an FARDC drone strike near the Rubaya mines in North Kivu, along with at least eight others.
- 26 February –
  - The government and the United States agree to a $1.2 billion strategic health partnership for 2026–2031, including $900 million in U.S. assistance and $300 million in increased domestic health spending.
  - Authorities announce the discovery of 171 bodies from two mass graves in Uvira.

=== March ===
- 2 March – A suspected M23 drone attack is carried out on Kisangani Airport.
- 3 March – At least 200 people are killed in a collapse at the Rubaya mines.
- 11 March – Three people, including a French United Nations aid worker, are killed in drone strikes in Goma with the occupying M23 rebels blaming the Congolese government.
- 17 March – A court in Belgium orders former diplomat Étienne Davignon to stand trial on charges of participation in war crimes in connection with the 1961 killing of former Congolese prime minister Patrice Lumumba. Davignon is the only surviving individual among those accused by Lumumba’s family of involvement in the case.
- 29 March – Veron Mosengo-Omba resigns as general secretary of the Confederation of African Football, amid controversy following the disputed 2025 Africa Cup of Nations Final decision to strip Senegal of the title after an appeal by the Royal Moroccan Football Federation.
- 31 March – The national football team defeats Jamaica 1-0 in Guadalajara, Mexico, in the inter-confederation play-off final; qualifying for the FIFA World Cup for the first time since 1974.

=== April ===
- 2 April – At least 43 civilians are killed in an assault by the ADF in Mambasa, Ituri Province.
- 5 April – The government announces it will begin receiving third country nationals deported from the United States under a new bilateral agreement; facilities begin preparation near Kinshasa, with costs covered by the US.
- 20 April – Authorities announce the rescue of least 200 civilians held captive by the ADF following a joint operation conducted by Congolese troops and the Uganda People's Defence Force along the Epulu river in eastern DRC.
- 27 April – The General Inspectorate of Mines announces the creation of a paramilitary unit to protect the country's mines with the help of US and UAE funding.
- 30 April – The United States imposes sanctions on former president Joseph Kabila over his support for rebels in the eastern DRC.

=== May ===
- 7 May – At least 26 people are killed following ADF attacks on villages in Ituri and North Kivu provinces.
- 9 May – At least 69 people are killed following a CODECO attack in Ituri province.
- 11 May – M23 rebels withdraw from Sange in South Kivu.
- 15 May – The Africa Centres for Disease Control and Prevention (Africa CDC) confirms an outbreak of Bundibugyo ebolavirus in Ituri Province; 246 cases and 80 deaths are reported, mainly in the Bunia, Mongwalu and Rwampara health zones.
- 17 May – Rwanda closes the Goma-Gisenyi border crossing with the DRC amid the 2026 Ituri Province Ebola epidemic.
- 21 May – The Rwampara General Hospital is partially set on fire by residents protesting against the handling of the bodies of deceased Ebola victims.
- 22 May –
  - Authorities in Ituri Province ban funeral wakes and impose restrictions on gatherings, transport of bodies, and sporting events in an attempt to contain the spread of the 2026 Ebola epidemic there.
  - The government suspends mining activities for three months in Mwenga and Shabunda territories, citing illicit mining operations and mining fraud.
- 26 May – 2026 Central Africa Ebola epidemic: Canada imposes a mandatory 21-day self-isolation for travelers arriving from the DRC, Uganda, and South Sudan, and suspends visa applications from those countries effective from the next day until 29 August.
- 27 May – 2026 Central Africa Ebola epidemic: Uganda closes its border with the DRC for four weeks in an effort to limit the spread of the Bundibugyo ebolavirus.
- 31 May – Twenty people are killed in an ADF attack on a village in Beni Territory, North Kivu.

=== June ===
- 2 June – The United States imposes sanctions on M23 intelligence chief John Imani Nzenze and FDLR commander Gustave Kubwayo, as a result of their involvement in the ongoing DRC–Rwanda conflict.
- 3 June – Ten people are killed in multiple ADF raids on villages near Beni Territory, North Kivu.
- 11 June–19 July – The DRC participates at the 2026 FIFA World Cup.
- 15 June – The Senate unanimously adopts a bill to amend the constitution, that will allow a referendum enabling President Tshisekedi to seek a third term.
- 26 June – The government files a case against Rwanda at the International Court of Justice, alleging that Rwanda had violated international law through its alleged military involvement and support for armed groups in eastern DR Congo, and seeking reparations and an order for Rwanda to cease the alleged violations.
- 27 June – The Interior Minister issues an order banning public gatherings in Kinshasa, Tshopo, Haut-Uele, and Bas-Uele provinces, citing the risk of Ebola transmission and requiring enhanced health surveillance.

=== July ===
- 4 July – A boat carrying students sinks at the confluence of the Sankuru and Kasai Rivers in Ilebo Territory, Kasaï Province, killing at least 20 people.
- 13 July – The US government announces that American citizens in the DRC will be temporarily barred from boarding commercial flights home and requires them to spend 21 days in a third country before traveling because of the 2026 Ebola epidemic.

=== August ===
- 8 August – At least 13 civilians are killed by ADF militants in Banana École, outside Mambasa.
- 17 August – 2026 Ebola epidemic: The ongoing Ebola outbreak becomes the deadliest in the history of the DRC, after government figures reach at least 2,325 deaths.

=== September ===
- 3 September – The Israeli and Congolese foreign ministries jointly state that the DRC will move its embassy from Tel Aviv to Jerusalem.
- 4 September – Twenty-two people are killed in a wedding party fire in Kinshasa.
- 10 September – At least 24 people are killed in a fire that destroys 300 houses and two schools in the Kadutu commmune of Bukavu.
- 24 September –
  - Security forces open fire to quell rioting at a cemetery in Beni, North Kivu, killing one person and injuring several others.
  - At least 41 people die when a boat carrying 100 passengers with cargo capsizes along Lake Tanganyika in Mapera.
- 25 September – Seventeen people are killed after a Let L-410 plane crashes into a residential area in Kenge, Kwango.
- 27 September – UDPS senior member Marie-Celestin Karondwa is beaten by residents of his neighbourhood in Butembo, North Kivu, after appearing on a radio programme promoting Ebola prevention measures.

=== October ===
- 3 October – At least 22 people die when two boats collide on the Congo River near Lukolela, Équateur province.
- 25 October – Uganda imposes a 21-day quarantine on citizens returning from the DRC as part of tightened Ebola precautions.

=== November ===
- 6 November – At least 33 civilians are killed by ADF militants in North Kivu.
- 10 November – A court-martial in Walikale, North Kivu sentences 66 soldiers to death for charges including cowardice, mutiny and insubordination.

== Holidays ==
- 1 January – New Year's Day
- 4 January – Martyrs' Day
- 16 January – Laurent-Désiré Kabila Assassination
- 17 January – Patrice Lumumba Assassination
- 14 February – Valentine's Day
- 8 March – Women's Day
- 20 March –
  - Francophonie Day
  - March Equinox
- 6 April – Kimbangu Memorial Day
- 30 April – Education Day
- 1 May – May Day
- 17 May – Liberation Day
- 21 June – June Solstice
- 30 June – Independence Day
- 1 August – Parents' Day
- 23 September – September Equinox
- 27 September – Tourism Day
- 21 December – December Solstice
- 24 December – Christmas Eve
- 25 December – Christmas Day
- 31 December – New Year's Eve

== Deaths ==
- 24 February – Willy Ngoma, 52, military spokesman (March 23 Movement).
- 18 March – Catherine Nzuzi wa Mbombo, 81, politician and feminist
- 26 June – Likulia Bolongo, 86, prime minister (1997).
- 18 September – Miguel Mumbere Masaisai, 23, long-distance cyclist and activist.
