= 2025 Democratic Republic of the Congo attacks =

Conflict in the Democratic Republic of the Congo

Since the start of 2025, the conflict in eastern Democratic Republic of Congo has intensified. On 26 January, the March 23 Movement (M23), along with allied Rwandan forces, seized control of Goma, the capital of North Kivu. By 27 January, the M23 had taken control of significant areas of the city after fierce clashes with DRC forces.

== Humanitarian situation ==
As of 3 February, over 700,000 people are displaced within Goma. 7.8 million people are internally displaced in the whole country (as of December 2024). Attacks and armed clashes were responsible for more than 89 percent of these displacements, while the remaining 11 percent were caused by natural disasters. North Kivu, South Kivu, Ituri, and Tanganyika are the provinces most affected.

== List of attacks in 2025 ==
Date	Dead	Injured	Involved	Location – Circumstances
15 January	10+		ADF	North Kivu, Lubero Territory, Makoko – At least ten people were killed in an attack by the Allied Democratic Forces.
27 January	150+		Male prisoners	North Kivu, Goma – Female prisoners were attacked and their wing was set on fire after a mass rape, killing nearly all women and 26 children. Only 9–13 of 165 female inmates survived.
29 January	9		Islamic State Central Africa Province (ISCAP)	North Kivu, Lubero District – 30 homes set on fire.
2 February	28		Armed group	Ituri, Irumu Territory, Samboko and Ndalya – 3 villages were attacked and 28 people killed. The attack led to panic and thousand civilians fled the area.
7 February	3		Undisclosed	North Kivu – Three Swiss church aid workers were killed.
10 February	80+		CODECO	Ituri, Djugu Territory – Militants attacked Djaiba villages. They killed adults and children, set houses on fire, looted and committed sexual violence.
12 February	70+		Islamic State – Central Africa Province	North Kivu, Lubero – More than 70 people were kidnapped and later found beheaded.
16 February	3		M23	South Kivu, Bukavu – Three children were killed during summary executions by M23.
24-27 February	6	3	Zaïre militia	Ituri, Djugu Territory, Masumbuko – An attack by the Zaïre militia over several days killed six soldiers and injured three. The militia took an unknown number of casualties in fighting with the FARDC.
25-26 February	23		ADF	Ituri province, Matolo and Samboko – 23 civilians were killed, and 20 civilians, mostly farmers, were kidnapped.
27 February	11	65	Undisclosed	South Kivu, Bukavu – An explosions at a rally held by M23 rebels killed and injured people.
1 March and 3 March			M23	North Kivu, Goma – CBCA Ndosho Hospital and Heal Africa Hospital were raided in a coordinated attack, and 130 to 150 patients were kidnapped.
7 March	3	1	Mai-Mai Kata Katanga	Tanganyika, Moba Territory, Kamena – An attack by the Mai-Mai Kata Katanga and Twas militias on a village and an FARDC camp left three rebels dead and one soldier injured.
19 March	0	7+	FARDC & militia - M23	Walikale, North Kivu — M23 took this mining city with relatively little fighting, but demilitarized it 3 days later as part of a temporary peace agreement.
11 May	4		M23	Four members of a single household were fatally shot and burned in their home in Kabale Katambi, located in the Rusayo groupement of Bukumu Chiefdom.
12 July	66		Islamic State militia -Allied Democratic Forces (ADF)	Ituri province, Walese Vonkutu chiefdom, Irumu territory, In an attack by the Islamic State militia ADF, 66 civilians were killed, in what Jean Tobie Okala, the spokesperson for the United Nations mission in Ituri in eastern Congo, called the attack a “bloodbath.”
27 July	38	15	Islamic State militia -Allied Democratic Forces (ADF)	Ituri province, Komanda, Eastern Congo, in an attack by the Islamic State militia ADF on a church, more than 38 people were shot dead and at least three charred bodies were discovered inside and outside the church.
8-9 September	64+		ADF	Ntoyo, North Kivu, ADF attacked the civilians of this village and burned down certain homes.

== Gallery ==
Location of DR of the Congo

Region with a high amount of attacks.

== See also ==
- 2025 in the Democratic Republic of the Congo
- List of massacres in the Democratic Republic of the Congo
- Attacks on humanitarian workers
