= 2024 in the Democratic Republic of the Congo =

- Decades: 2000s; 2010s; 2020s
- See also: Other events of 2024; History of the DRC

Events of the year 2024 in the Democratic Republic of the Congo.

== Incumbents ==
- President: Félix Tshisekedi
- Prime Minister: Sama Lukonde (until 12 June); Judith Suminwa (since 12 June)

== Events ==
=== January ===
- 16 January – A Congolese soldier is killed and two others are arrested by the Rwandan Army in a cross-border shooting incident in Rubavu District.
- 24 January – At least 18 people are killed after a truck plunged into a ravine in Kasangulu, Kongo Central.
- 27 January – Fighting between FARDC and aligned Wazalendo groups against Rwandan-backed M23 fighters continue in Mweso and Karuba, North Kivu.
- 28 January – Forty people are presumed dead after a boat capsizes in Lake Kivu.

=== February ===
- 9 February – At least 18 people are killed during a collision between a bus and a truck on a road in Kinshasa.
- 19 February – Rwanda rejects the United States’ calls to withdraw troops and missile systems from the eastern Democratic Republic of the Congo, citing threats from an alleged Congolese military build-up near the border.

=== April ===
- 13 April – 2024 Dibaya Lubwe landslide: At least 15 people are killed and 60 more are missing during a landslide in Idiofa.

=== May ===
- 3 May:
  - The mining town of Rubaya is seized by the March 23 Movement.
  - Thirty-five people are killed and more than 20 injured in bombings at two camps for displaced people in Lac Vert and Mugunga, in North Kivu.
- 19 May – The government announces that it had foiled a coup attempt following an attack on the residence of Economy Minister Vital Kamerhe in Kinshasa and reports of gunfire near the presidential palace.

=== June ===
- 5 June – At least 16 people are killed by suspected Allied Democratic Forces (ADF) militants in Beni.
- 7 June – At least 38 people are killed by suspected ADF militants in the Beni area.
- 10 June – At least 86 passengers are killed after a boat capsizes along the Kwah River in Mai-Ndombe Province.
- 13 June – Suspected Islamist rebels kill over 20 people in Mayikengo village, North Kivu.
- 22 June – At least 23 people are killed by CODECO militia groups in Ituri Province.
- 26 June – Two South African soldiers are killed and twenty others are injured in a mortar attack on their logistics base.
- 28 June – M23 rebels take control of Luofu and Kanyabayonga after heavy fighting with the Congolese military. Almost the entire population of Kanyabayonga, including refugees it had taken in from Rutshuru, flee the town.
- 30 June:
  - M23 rebels take control of Kirumba, the largest town in Lubero Territory, before continuing north.
  - Two aid workers from the international NGO Tearfund are killed in an attack on their convoy in Butembo, North Kivu.

=== July ===
- 3 July – A court-martial in Butembo sentences 25 soldiers to death for desertion during fighting with M23 rebels.
- 4 July – CODECO claims responsibility for the killing of six Chinese gold miners and the kidnapping of two more, as well as the killing of two FARDC soldiers in Ituri Province.
- 8 July – A United Nations report formally accuses the Uganda People's Defence Force of providing military support to the M23 rebel group in eastern DRC. Uganda denies the claims. The report also reveals that between 3,000 and 4,000 Rwandan soldiers are fighting alongside M23 rebels.
- 13 July –
  - CODECO militiamen attack the Zaire militia-controlled trading post of Pluto in Ituri Province leading to a four-hour battle that sees the participation of the FARDC and leaves 13 Zaire, seven CODECO, and six FARDC soldiers dead.
  - The FARDC repels an attack by Mobondo militiamen on the village of Kinsele, Kwamouth. At least 72 people are reported killed, including nine FARDC soldiers.
- 15 July – Fighting between the FARDC, pro-government militia, and M23 rebels is reported in the Bashali Chiefdom, Bahunde Chiefdom, and the surroundings of Bweremana following simultaneous attacks on the positions of the FARDC and allies by the M23. Four civilians are killed and five others are injured in a bombardment on Bweremana blamed on M23.
- 19 July – The governor of South Kivu orders a ban on all mining activities in the province, citing "disorder" caused by mine operators.
- 27 July – Nine people are killed in a crowd crush at a gospel concert by Mike Kalambay at the Stade des Martyrs in Kinshasa.
- 30 July – Angolan President João Lourenço announces that the Democratic Republic of the Congo and Rwanda have agreed to a ceasefire following Angola-mediated talks. However, the ceasefire collapses before it formally begins on 4 August amid advances by M23 rebels.

=== August ===
- 5 August – Nearly 100 Congolese National Police officers flee to Uganda as fighting between M23 rebels and the FARDC intensifies.
- 6 August – President Félix Tshisekedi accuses former President Joseph Kabila of backing the Alliance Fleuve Congo, a U.S-sanctioned coalition of rebel groups whose main member is the M23.
- 8 August – A military court sentences Alliance Fleuve Congo leader Corneille Nangaa to death in absentia after convicting him on war crimes charges. Twenty-four co-defendants are given the same sentences, with 19 of them also in absentia.
- 10 August – At least 12 people are killed in an attack by the ADF on the village of Mukonia, North Kivu.
- 11–12 August – The border between the DRC and Zambia is closed due to a dispute over the importation of beverages from Zambia.
- 15 August – At least 16 civilians are killed in clashes between M23 rebels and pro-government Wazalendo fighters in Rutshuru Territory, North Kivu.
- 17–18 August – At least 20 people are killed and hundreds reported missing after a boat sinks while travelling illegally overnight along the Lukenie River in Mai-Ndombe Province.
- 26 August – Germany announces that it will donate 100,000 doses of mpox vaccines to the DRC and other African nations, as well as provide funding to the GAVI Vaccine Alliance through the World Health Organization. The shipment arrives on 5 September, while vaccinations begin on 5 October.

=== September ===
- 2 September – At least 129 inmates are killed in an attempted jailbreak at the Makala Central Prison in Kinshasa.
- 5 September – Paralympic athletes Mireille Nganga and Emmanuel Grace Mouambako go missing in France after competing in the 2024 Summer Paralympics in Paris.
- 13 September – A court in Kinshasa sentences 37 people to death for their alleged roles in the coup attempt in May.
- 17 September – CODECO militants kill ten civilians in an overnight attack on a Hema village in Ituri Province. Some of the victims were beheaded, according to local authorities.
- 23 September – The World Health Organization announces that nearly 30,000 suspected mpox cases have been reported in Africa so far this year, primarily in the Democratic Republic of the Congo, as the death toll from mpox surpasses 800 people.

=== October ===
- 3 October – A boat capsizes in Lake Kivu near Kituku, killing at least 78 people.
- 9 October – The Democratic Republic of the Congo is elected to a seat at the United Nations Human Rights Council for a three-year term beginning in 2025.
- 14 October – The government cancels auctions for exploring 27 sites across the country believed to contain about 22 billion barrels of oil, citing lack of bidders and late submissions of applications.
- 21–22 October – Clashes break out between the Congolese military and M23 rebels for control of Kalembe in North Kivu.

=== November ===
- 3 November – M23 rebels seize the town of Kamandi Gîte in North Kivu.
- 10–25 November – Up to 143 people are reported to have died in an outbreak of an unidentified disease in Panzi, Kwango Province.
- 15 November – At least 13 people are killed in an ADF attack on the village of Mabisio in North Kivu.
- 28 November – Seth Kikuni, the leader of the Piste pour l’Emergence party, is sentenced to a year of imprisonment on charges of incitement and spreading false information during a political rally in Lubumbashi in September.

=== December ===
- 1 December – At least 10 people are killed in an ADF attack on Batangi-Mbau in North Kivu.
- 3 December – At least nine people are killed and three others are abducted in an ADF attack on Tenambo in North Kivu.
- 17 December – At least 25 people are killed after an overloaded passenger boat sinks along the Fimi River in Inongo, Mai-Ndombe Province.
- 19 December – President Tshisekedi dismisses General Christian Tshiwewe Songesha as chief of staff of the FARDC and replaces him with Lieutenant General Jules Banza Mwilambwe.
- 20 December – At least 38 people are killed and 100 others are reported missing after an overloaded ferry sinks along the Busira River in Équateur Province.

== Holidays ==
- 1 January - New Year's Day
- 4 January - Martyrs' Day
- 16 January - Laurent-Désiré Kabila Assassination
- 17 January - Patrice Lumumba Assassination
- 1 May - Labour Day
- 17 May - Liberation Day
- 30 June - Independence Day
- 1 August – Parents' Day
- 17 November – Army Day
- 25 December – Christmas Day

== Deaths ==
- 30 September – Dikembe Mutombo (b. 1966), Congolese-born American National Basketball Association player.
