= 2022 in the Democratic Republic of the Congo =

- Decades: 2000s; 2010s; 2020s
- See also: Other events of 2022; History of the DRC

Events of the year 2022 in the Democratic Republic of the Congo.

== Events ==
=== February ===
- 2 February - Around 60 people are killed in an attack by members of the CODECO paramilitary.

=== March ===
- 27 March - The March 23 Movement begins an offensive
- 29 March - 2022 MONUSCO helicopter crash

=== May ===
- 28 May - 24 people die in an attack by militants in Beni region.

=== June ===
- 5 June - Between 18 and 27 people are killed in a massacre by suspected Allied Democratic Forces fighters in Otomabere, Irumu Territory, Ituri Province.

=== July ===
- 25 July – Protests against MONUSCO begin in Goma.

=== September ===
- 27 September – The Ministry of Health of the Democratic Republic of the Congo formally declares an end to the latest outbreak of Ebola.

=== October ===
- 30 October - Government expels Rwandan ambassador to Congo after alleged Rwandan government support for M23 rebels.
