= DRC civil war =

DRC civil war may refer to:

- First Congo War (1996–1997)
- Second Congo War (1998–2003)
- Kivu conflict
- M23 campaign (2022–present)
