= 2025 Bukavu M23 rally bombings =

Bombing attack in South Kivu, DRC

- Part of M23 campaign (2022–present), following the 2025 Bukavu offensive
- Location: Independence Square, Bukavu, South Kivu, Democratic Republic of the Congo
- Date: 27 February 2025
- Target: M23 rebel rally
- Attack type: Bombings, gunfire
- Weapons: Grenade, firearms
- Deaths: 11+ (per Congo River Alliance); 13+ (per Provisional)
- Injuries: 65+ (per Congo River Alliance); 70-100 (per Provisional)
- Perpetrator: Under investigation

The 2025 Bukavu M23 rally bombings were a series of explosions that occurred on 27 February 2025, during a public gathering organized by the Rwandan-backed March 23 Movement (M23) rebel group in Bukavu, South Kivu, Democratic Republic of the Congo. The explosions resulted in multiple fatalities and dozens of injuries at Independence Square, which had been captured by M23 forces earlier that month.

== Bombings ==
On 27 February 2025, the M23 rebel group organized a large public rally at Independence Square in central Bukavu to celebrate their capture of the city. Thousands of local residents attended the gathering, where Congo River Alliance (AFC) leader Corneille Nangaa and other senior M23 officials were present. The AFC is a coalition of militia groups that includes M23 as a primary component.

According to eyewitness accounts, two explosions detonated and gunfire was heard as rebel leaders were departing from the speaker's platform. The blasts caused immediate panic, with attendees fleeing the area in large numbers. Video documentation shared through social media platforms showed casualties at the scene, including multiple fatalities and numerous injured individuals requiring emergency assistance. Several civilians were filmed carrying limp casualties from the scene.

Emergency responders transported wounded individuals to local medical facilities, while M23 forces established security cordons around the blast site. In a press conference following the incident, Corneille Nangaa reported that 11 people were killed and 65 others injured in the attack. This casualty count was separately confirmed by hospital sources speaking to international news agencies. Provisional estimates placed the death toll at over 13, with at least 70 people wounded.

== Reactions ==
=== M23 ===
In an official statement released hours after the incident, M23 leadership accused the Congolese government of orchestrating the attack, describing it as a "cowardly and barbaric act" and "plan of exterminating civilian populations" that would face consequences. M23 representatives reported that grenades used were found to be the same as the grenades the Burundi National Defence Force, who fought on the side of the Congolese army. AFC leader Corneille Nangaa stated that due to the bombings, that the AFC would be "obliged to react". He stated that two "terrorists from Kinshasa" were arrested at the scene. He further reported that no rebel leaders were injured in the attack.

=== Congolese government ===
Congolese President Felix Tshisekedi characterized the explosions as "a heinous terrorist act that was perpetrated by a foreign army illegally present on Congolese soil," implicitly referencing Rwanda. Jean Samy, the deputy president of the Civil Society Forces Vives of South Kivu, described the attack as "sabotage" carried out by unidentified perpetrators.
