= 2022 Pakistan Army Aviation Corps helicopter crash =

Helicopter crash in DR Congo

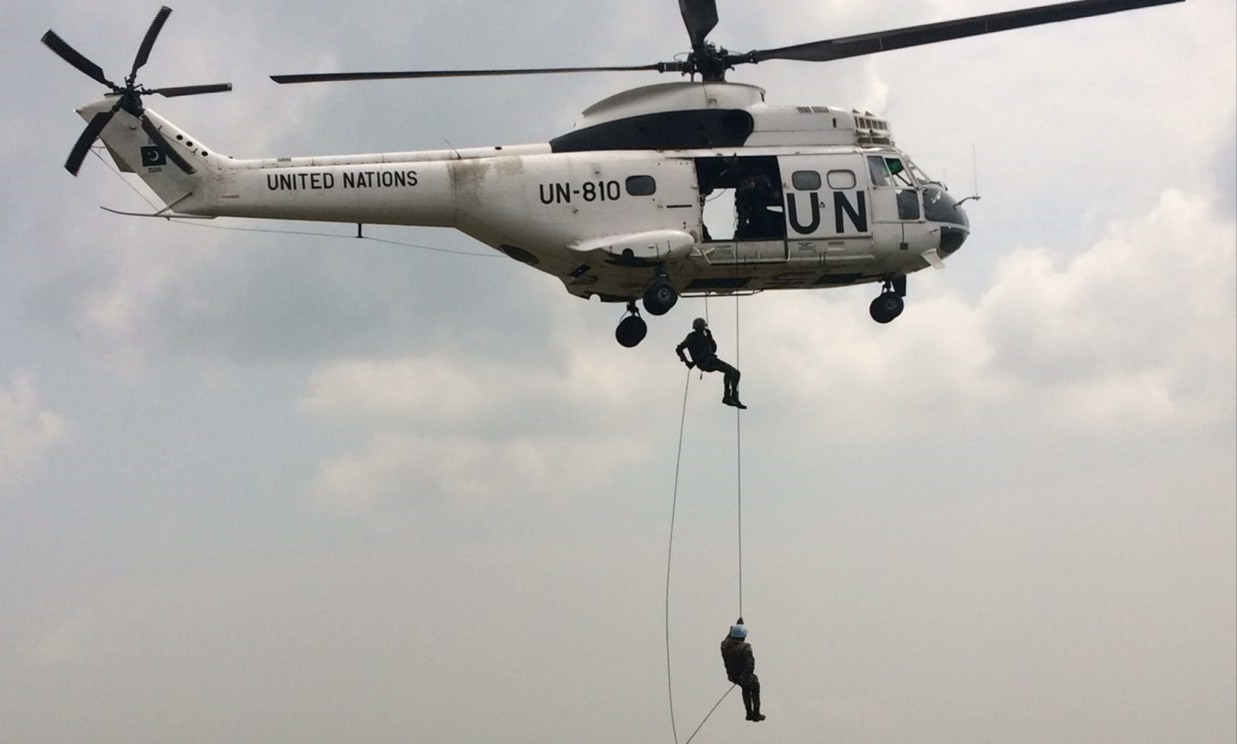
- The Puma helicopter involved in the crash

Crash
- Date: 29 March 2022
- Summary: Crashed due to unknown reason during a reconnaissance mission
- Site: Rutshuru region of North Kivu, Democratic Republic of Congo

Aircraft
- Aircraft type: Aérospatiale SA330 Puma
- Operator: Pakistan Army Aviation Corps
- Registration: UN-810
- Occupants: 8
- Passengers: 2
- Crew: 6
- Fatalities: 8
- Survivors: 0

On 29 March 2022, a SA 330L Puma helicopter belonging to the Pakistan Army's aviation division and assigned to the United Nations Organization Stabilization Mission in the Democratic Republic of the Congo (MONUSCO) crashed during a reconnaissance mission over the province of North Kivu, Democratic Republic of Congo. The crash killed all eight UN Peacekeepers on board, six from Pakistan and one each from Russia and Serbia.

Pakistan's Ambassador to the UN, Munir Akram, confirmed the identities' of the soldiers on board the helicopter.

== Events ==
On 29 March, MONUSCO lost contact with a helicopter on a reconnaissance mission in eastern Congo, in the area around the village of Tshanzu, southeast of the more regionally important town of Rutshuru.

A search and rescue operation by the contingent of Uruguay recovered the bodies later that day and took them to Goma, the province's capital.

The Armed Forces of the Democratic Republic of the Congo said the helicopter crash was intentionally shot down by the rebel March 23 Movement (M23), which had launched an offensive against the government shortly before the crash. M23 spokesman Willy Ngoma accused the Congolese government of lying, saying that the group suspected the military to be responsible. Fighting between the Congolese army and the M23 had been going on for several days before the crash in North Kivu.

== Reactions ==
Prime Minister of Pakistan Imran Khan said that he was filled with a "deep sense of horror and grief," thanking the Pakistani military for their operations.

== See also ==
- 2022 M23 offensive
- 2017 Crash of two Mi-24s in DR Congo
