= 2023 in the Democratic Republic of the Congo =

- Decades: 2000s; 2010s; 2020s
- See also: Other events of 2023; History of the DRC

Events of the year 2023 in the Democratic Republic of the Congo.

== Incumbents ==
- President: Félix Tshisekedi
- Prime Minister: Sama Lukonde

== Events ==
=== January ===
- 16 January – Ten people are killed and 39 others are injured when a bomb explodes at a Pentecostal church in Kasindi, North Kivu, Democratic Republic of the Congo. The Islamic State has claimed responsibility for the attack.
- 18 January – The United Nations reports the discovery of mass graves in Ituri Province, containing the bodies of 49 civilians. CODECO militants are suspected of being behind the killings.
- 23 January – Allied Democratic Forces insurgents kill 23 people for consuming beer at a bar in North Kivu. The jihadists also torch several homes and shops in the village.
- 31 January – Pope Francis begins his first papal visit to the Democratic Republic of the Congo. He will also visit South Sudan on the same trip.

=== February ===
- 1 February – M23 insurgents capture the town of Kitshanga in North Kivu, after days of heavy fighting. The DRC's army confirm the withdrawal of its troops from the town, saying it was a "tactical move to protect civilians".
- 27 February – M23 rebels seize the town of Rubaya and the Rubaya coltan mines in North Kivu, after government forces withdraw from the area.

=== March ===
- 4 March – Kivu conflict: Burundi deploys 100 troops to the eastern Democratic Republic of the Congo to help the country fight insurgencies by militias, including M23.
- 9 March – During an attack at least 36 people are killed in Mukondi.
- 12 March – Nineteen people are killed by suspected Islamist insurgents in Kirindera, North Kivu.

=== April ===
- 2 April –
  - South Sudanese troops arrive in Goma, becoming the fourth country to join a coalition of peacekeeping missions to fight insurgencies.
  - At least 21 people are dead and others are missing after a landslide in the locality of Bolowa (Bulwa village/Masisi Territory), North Kivu.
- 3 April – Six people are killed and 64 others are missing after a boat capsizes in the Lake Kivu.
- 7 April –
  - Twenty people are killed after Islamic State members storm the village of Musandaba on the outskirts of the city of Beni, North Kivu.
  - Murder of Luca Attanasio: A court in the Democratic Republic of the Congo sentences six men to life in prison for the assassination of Italian envoy Luca Attanasio in February 2021.

=== May ===
- 5 May – 2023 Africa floods: At least 176 people are killed by floods in the villages of Bushushu and Nyamukubi in South Kivu.
- 7 May – 2023 Africa floods: The death toll from the 6 May floods in the villages of Bushushu and Nyamukubi in South Kivu, increases to 401 people.
- 10 May – Ten people are killed in Lubero and six more are killed at the Rubaya mines, North Kivu during two landslides.
- 19 May – Four people are killed and six others are injured in an armed ambush on a convoy near the village of Kivandya, North Kivu.
- 28 May – Two rangers are killed in a shooting at Virunga National Park in North Kivu.

=== June ===
- 12 June – At least 46 people are killed by CODECO in an IDP camp in the Bahema Badjere district of Ituri.

=== July ===
- 5 July – At least eight people are killed in attacks in Bungushu, North Kivu.
- 19 July – An explosive device accidentally detonated in a field in Lubwe, killing 9 and wounding at least 16.

=== October ===
- 30 October – 2023 Democratic Republic of the Congo general election: The Constitutional Court of the Democratic Republic of the Congo dismisses a case aiming to disqualify former Katanga governor Moïse Katumbi from the presidential election, asserting that Katumbi solely possesses Congolese nationality despite claims of dual citizenship, which the country does not recognize.

=== November ===
- 18 November – At least four civilians and three soldiers are killed, with 11 injured, in a mass shooting at a IDP camp in Nyiragongo, North Kivu, amid ongoing conflict between the army and M23 rebels.

=== December ===
- The East African Community's task force begins withdrawing from North Kivu, after the country refused to renew the force's mandate.
- 20 December – 2023 Democratic Republic of the Congo general election: Voters in the Democratic Republic of the Congo elect the President, members of the National Assembly, provincial assemblies, and commune councils.
- 26 December – Twenty-two people are killed by floods in Kasaï-Central. Several houses and structures are damaged, with a major road being cut off.
- 29 December – At least 20 people are killed during landslides caused by torrential rains in Mwenga Territory, South Kivu.
- 31 December – 2023 Democratic Republic of the Congo general election: President Félix Tshisekedi is declared the winner of the general election.

== Deaths ==
- 4 February – Léon Engulu, 88, politician, governor of Katanga (1968–1970), minister of the interior (1990–1991) and senator (2003–2018).
