= M23 campaign (2022–present) =

M23 rebel offensive in the DR Congo

- Part of the Kivu conflict and the Democratic Republic of the Congo–Rwanda conflict
- Military situation as of 10 May 2025 Controlled by the M23 Movement and allied militias Controlled by the Congolese army and allied militias Presence of Ugandan army forces Presence of Burundi army forces Presence of Wazalendo militias (DRC-aligned): Resources: Gold mines; Tantalum, tungsten or tin mines
Date	27 March 2022 – present (4 years, 7 months, 2 weeks and 4 days)
Location	North Kivu and South Kivu, Democratic Republic of the Congo (DRC)
Status	Ongoing
Territorial changes	M23 occupies some of North and South Kivu provinces

Belligerents
Front for the Refoundation of the Nation (since Oct. 2026); M23 Movement; Twirwaneho (since Feb. 2025); Congo River Alliance; RED-Tabara (since Feb. 2025); Mai-Mai Rushaba (since March 2025); Rwanda (Note: Rwandan involvement was first alleged by the DR Congo, a claim which was later substantiated by the findings of researchers tasked by the United Nations. Rwanda has denied its support for M23.); Anti-government Nyatura-factions	DR Congo (United Nations) MONUSCO: Pakistan; India; Russia; Serbia; Tanzania; Morocco; Malawi (until 2025); South Africa (until 2026); (East African Community) EAC Regional Force (until 2023): Uganda (March – June 2022); Burundi (August 2022–present); Kenya (from November 2022-December 2023); South Sudan (from December 2022-December 2023); SADC Mission in DRC (until 2025); FDLR (Democratic Republic of the Congo) Wazalendo: Nduma Defense of Congo-Renovated; Pro-government Mai-Mai; Pro-government Nyatura factions; APCLS

Commanders and leaders
Joseph Kabila; Bertrand Bisimwa; Sultani Makenga (WIA); Yusuf Mboneza † (disputed); Léon Kanyamibwa	Félix Tshisekedi (Democratic Republic of the Congo) Pacifique Masunzu (Democratic Republic of the Congo) Peter Cirimwami Nkuba † (Democratic Republic of the Congo) Clément Bitangalo Bulime (Democratic Republic of the Congo) Philémon Yav Irung (Democratic Republic of the Congo) Constant Ndima Kongba (Democratic Republic of the Congo) Muhindo Lwanzo (Democratic Republic of the Congo) Francois-Xavier Aba van Ang (East African Community) Jeff Mungai Nyagah (East African Community) Alphaxard Kiugu; Gaston Iyamuremye; Pacifique Ntawungukav; Ezechiel Gakwerere (POW)

Units involved
M23 forces; Bisimwa faction (Revolutionary Army of Congo); Makenga faction; Rwandan Defence Force (denied by Rwanda); 401st Battalion	DR Congo forces; Armed Forces (FARDC); Operations sector "Sokola 2/Nord-Kivu"; 32nd Military Region; Air Force; Republican Guard; Congolese National Police; Pro-government militias; Romanian mercenaries; UN FIB; EAC Regional Force; Uganda People's Defence Force; 25th Battalion; 35th Battalion

Strength
Rebels: 100–200+ (Mar 2022); 400+ (May 2022); 6,000+ (Jan 2025); Rwanda: c. 3,000–4,000	(Democratic Republic of the Congo) 60,000 (South Africa) 2,900 (Kenya) 900+ (South Sudan) 750

Casualties and losses
Unknown	(Democratic Republic of the Congo) 1 helicopter shot down (United Nations) 1 helicopter shot down, 29 killed (Note: Eight killed (6 Pakistanis, 1 Russian, 1 Serbian) during helicopter crash, 1 Moroccan killed in ground combat with M23. Fourteen South Africans, 3 Malawians, 2 Tanzanians, 1 Uruguayan killed by M23 during the 2025 Goma offensive.)
- 30,000 civilians displaced to Uganda; 2.5 million displaced in total (as of 8 July 2024); 7,000 killed (25 Jan 2025 – 25 Feb 2025); ~900 dead to associated Ebola outbreak exacerbated by the conflict

The M23 campaign is an ongoing series of military offensives launched by the March 23 Movement (M23), a Rwandan-backed rebel paramilitary group in the Democratic Republic of the Congo, since March 2022. In November 2021, M23 first launched attacks against the Congolese military (FARDC) and MONUSCO, seizing military positions in Ndiza, Cyanzu, and Runyoni in North Kivu Province. This coincided with the deployment of Uganda People's Defence Force (UPDF) to the region to combat the Allied Democratic Forces (ADF), a Ugandan rebel group operating in the Congo's North Kivu and Ituri provinces.

The conflict escalated between March and June 2022, as M23 overran key areas in Rutshuru Territory, including the strategic border town of Bunagana, forcing Congolese soldiers to flee into Uganda. Uganda alleged that Rwanda orchestrated the offensive to undermine UPDF operations against the ADF, while Rwanda counterclaimed that Uganda was leveraging M23 elements to threaten its national security. The DRC accused Rwanda of provisioning armaments and reorganizing the insurgency, a claim substantiated by a United Nations Security Council (UNSC) Group of Experts report. Rwanda and M23, in turn, accused the DRC of collaborating with the Democratic Forces for the Liberation of Rwanda (FDLR) and claimed their campaign aimed to protect Banyamulenge from FDLR aggression. A UNSC report noted that Rwandan military incursions into Congolese territory had begun prior to alleged FARDC-FDLR cooperation, with analysts posited that M23's resurgence was primarily driven by economic and commercial interests rather than ethno-political or security concerns.

The conflict drew regional involvement, leading the East African Community (EAC) to deploy the East African Community Regional Force (EACRF) to stabilize the situation. On 26 January 2023, M23 captured Kitchanga. Exasperated by the perceived inaction of the EACRF, the Congolese government sought military assistance from the Southern African Development Community (SADC) and established a reserve corps, which encouraged the formation of militias under the Wazalendo movement near M23-controlled areas. In June 2023, Human Rights Watch documented widespread human rights abuses by M23, including extrajudicial executions, sexual violence, and other war crimes, with allegations of Rwandan complicity. The UNSC subsequently called for sanctions against M23 leaders and implicated high-ranking Rwandan officials in the violence. By March 2024, M23 had launched further offensives, including a northern push into Rutshuru Territory, capturing Rwindi and the Vitshumbi fishery along Lake Edward. An April UNSC-commissioned report estimated that between 3,000 and 4,000 Rwandan Defence Force (RDF) troops were present in eastern DRC, surpassing the estimated 3,000 M23 combatants. In June 2024, M23 and RDF forces seized Kanyabayonga and Kirumba and entering Lubero Territory for the first time. Diplomatic efforts, led by Angolan President João Lourenço, faltered after President Paul Kagame failed to attend a tripartite summit in Luanda on 15 December, which was meant to address the FDLR issue alongside President Félix Tshisekedi and President Lourenço. Rwanda's absence fueled suspicions that its involvement in eastern DRC was driven primarily by economic interests, particularly access to Kivu's mineral resources, rather than security concerns.

Beginning in January 2025, M23 began making major advances towards Goma and Bukavu, the provincial capitals of North Kivu and South Kivu, with alleged Rwandan backing, intensifying growing tensions between the two nations. By 30 January, M23 had captured all of Goma and began an advance towards Bukavu, capturing the town by 16 February. Following the capture of Goma, M23 announced their intentions to march on Kinshasa. Despite the DRC and M23 endorsing a Declaration of Principles on 19 July in Doha, which pledged peaceful dialogue, recognition of Congolese sovereignty, and respect for international law, M23 persisted in carrying out its campaign.

== Background ==
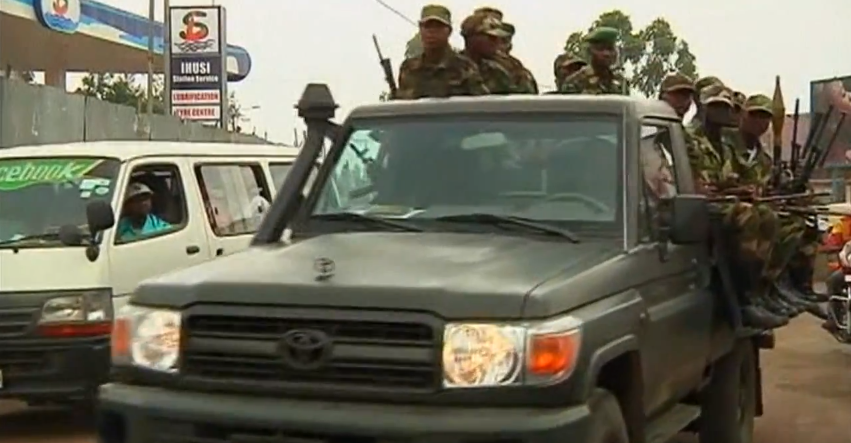
M23 rebels in Goma, November 2012

The March 23 Movement waged a rebellion in the northeastern Democratic Republic of the Congo (DRC) from 2012 to 2013. M23 was formed by deserters of the National Congress for the Defence of the People (CNDP), who had integrated into the Armed Forces of the Democratic Republic of the Congo (FARDC) following a 2009 peace agreement. The agreement, which was negotiated after the arrest of CNDP leader General Laurent Nkunda, included provisions for prisoner releases, CNDP's transformation into a political party, refugee reintegration, and the incorporation of CNDP members into government institutions and the national army. However, resistance from local communities—who viewed CNDP leaders as perpetrators of crimes—hindered the full implementation of these measures. Ex-CNDP fighters within the military were accused of exploiting their positions for illegal mineral trade. The rebellion formally commenced on 6 May 2012, culminating in clashes with the Congolese army and the United Nations Organization Stabilization Mission in the Democratic Republic of the Congo (MONUSCO). Both the CNDP as well as the 23 March Movement's first rebellion were supported by Rwanda and Uganda. Human Rights Watch accused M23 of committing war crimes, including summary executions, sexual violence, and forced recruitment, and suggested that some Rwandan officials were complicit due to their continued support for M23 operations. The uprising was defeated by a joint campaign of the DRC and MONUSCO force. After agreeing to a peace deal, M23 was largely dismantled, its fighters disarmed and moved into refugee camps in Uganda.

Despite the agreement, hostilities between M23 and the DR Congo continued. In 2017, M23 commander Sultani Makenga and about 100 to 200 of his followers fled from Uganda to resume their insurgency, setting up camp at Mount Mikeno in the border area between Rwanda, Uganda, and the DR Congo. On 7 November 2021, Makenga's troops carried out a small-scale attack on FARDC positions in Ndiza, Cyanzu, and Runyoni, resulting in four fatalities. However, this offensive had little impact, as M23 no longer received significant international support. That same month, Uganda and the DRC had greatly improved their relations, cooperating against a common enemy, the Allied Democratic Forces, during Operation Shujaa. In early 2022, a growing number of M23 combatants began leaving their camps and moving back to the DRC; the rebel movement launched more attacks in February 2022, but these were repelled. The M23 leadership argued that parts of their movement had resumed the insurgency because the conditions of the 2013 peace deal were not being honored by the DRC government. The rebels also argued that they were attempting to defend Kivu's Tutsi minority from attacks by Democratic Forces for the Liberation of Rwanda (FDLR), although critics pointed out that the FDLR no longer posed a substantial threat and that M23 operations had commenced before FARDC-FDLR cooperation intensified. Meanwhile, Ugandan authorities accused Rwanda of reigniting M23's insurgency after its economic interests in the DRC were disrupted. Earlier, in June 2021, Presidents Paul Kagame and Félix Tshisekedi signed an agreement permitting Dither Ltd—allegedly linked to the Rwandan military—to refine gold extracted by Sakima. This deal was seen as an effort to cut off funding for armed groups profiting from mineral smuggling. However, as allegations of Rwandan backing for M23 grew, the DRC suspended the agreement in early June 2022.

The situation was further complicated by the factionalism within M23, as the movement was split into rival groups, namely the "Alliance for the Salvation of the People" headed by Jean-Marie Runiga, and the "Revolutionary Army of Congo" of Bertrand Bisimwa respectively. In addition, Makenga's group was de facto separate from the other M23 forces which were still mainly based in Uganda. Later research organized by the United Nations Security Council suggested that Makenga's return to an insurgency had started the gradual rearmament and restoration of M23, with Bisimwa's "Revolutionary Army of Congo" joining these efforts in late 2021 by reorganizing its remaining fighters and recruiting new ones in cooperation with Makenga. The headquarters of the restored M23 is believed to be located at Mount Sabyinyo.

By 2022, M23 was just one of 120 armed groups that operated in the eastern DR Congo. Before March 2022, the Congolese government made attempts to reinforce its position against the resurgent M23 by sending more troops. However, such measures weakened its presence in other areas, such as those affected by the Allied Democratic Forces insurgency.

== Offensive ==
=== Initial actions ===
In the night of 27 March 2022, M23 rebels launched a new offensive in North Kivu, first attacking the villages of Tshanzu and Runyoni in the Rutshuru Territory from their strongholds at the surrounding hills. The two villages had been important strongholds of the M23 Movement during the 2012–13 rebellion. The rebel attack was reportedly led by Sultani Makenga. The DRC government claimed that Rwanda supported the insurgent operation, a claim which was denied by the Rwandan government and the rebels.

On 29 March, the FARDC was able to repel a rebel attack against the border town of Bunagana, but M23 captured several villages, including Mugingo, Gasiza, Chengerero, Rugamba, Kibote, Baseke and Kabindi. Also, a UN helicopter crashed at Tshanzu, killing eight MONUSCO peacekeepers. The FARDC blamed M23 rebels for shooting down the aircraft. At Bunagana, the FARDC received support by the Uganda People's Defence Force (UPDF). UPDF ground forces crossed the border, while Ugandan aircraft bombed the rebels. By 1 April, the clashes at Rutshuru had displaced 46,000 locals according to UNHCR. Meanwhile, the M23 fighters temporarily retreated to their mountain bases, with their first attacks being regarded as a failure. They subsequently proclaimed a unilateral ceasefire. One ex-M23 officer told the newspaper taz that it was entirely unclear what the rebel offensive was trying to achieve, with him speculating that Makenga was possibly hoping for one last battle to die in his homeland.

On 6 April, the FARDC rejected any negotiations with the M23 forces based in the DR Congo, and started a counter-attack. Four days later, M23 announced that it would withdraw its troops from any villages captured during the earlier clashes. However, as the fighting raged on, FARDC increasingly lost ground to the insurgents. Following the failure of initial peace talks, M23 forces, reportedly led by Makenga and including the Bisimwa faction, restarted their offensive in May. This operation was reportedly supported by at least 1,000 Rwandan soldiers. According to a local, M23 overran Kibumba on 18 May. On 19 May, M23 rebels attacked MONUSCO peacekeepers at Shangi, Rutshuru Territory, as the latter joined the FARDC in counter-insurgency operations. The rebel leadership declared that the attack was in response to a previous joint FARDC-FDLR operation. (Note: It has been reported that some FARDC soldiers who operate in North Kivu are former FDLR members. A later report for the United Nations by independent researchers stated that the FDLR had begun to fight alongside the FARDC in May, responding to the M23 offensive.) From 22 May, the rebels attempted to advance on North Kivu's provincial capital, Goma, displacing 70,000 people. From 22 to 23 May, a battle raged at Kibumba, while the insurgents temporarily seized Rumangabo before it was retaken by the FARDC. According to independent researchers, the insurgents were supported by Rwandan soldiers during the battle for Rumangabo.

On 25 May, M23 reached the outskirts of Goma but were repelled by MONUSCO, FARDC, and the FDLR after heavy fighting. The insurgents subsequently retreated, and there was a pause in fighting for the rest of the month. North Kivu's deputy police commander, Francois-Xavier Aba van Ang, released a video urging civilians to organize as militiamen to combat M23 in a "people's war". The FARDC also began arming existing local militias so that they could assist in the campaign against M23.

=== 2022–2024 offensives ===
==== Fall of Bunagana ====
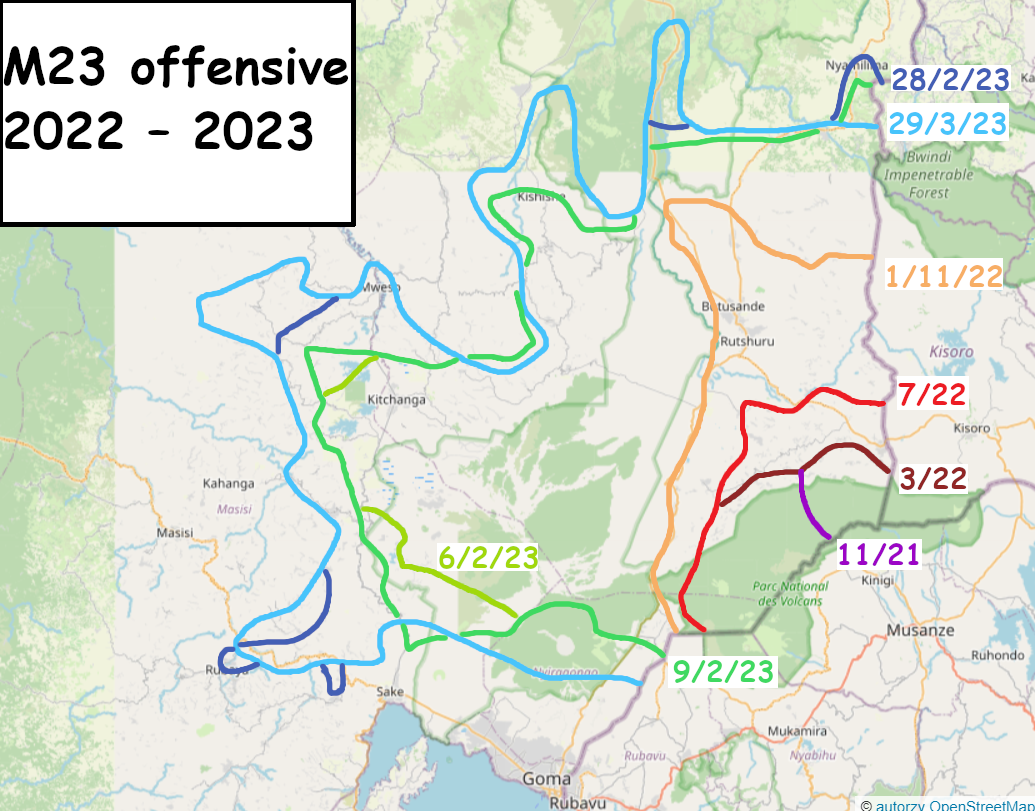
Map of the initial M23 offensive

By early June, M23 reorganized and assaulted a MONUSCO force at Muhati on June 8 before turning toward Bunagana again. Unlike the previous attack on Bunagana, Ugandan security forces did not intervene and instead retreated from the hills overlooking the town. M23 captured Bunagana on the following day, forcing the local garrison of 137 soldiers and 37 police officers to retreat across the border into Uganda. There, they surrendered to the local Ugandan security forces. North Kivu's military governor Constant Ndima Kongba initially denied that the FARDC had lost the town, but the FARDC spokesman Sylvain Ekenge later declared that the fall of Bunagana constituted "no less than an invasion" by Rwanda. In response, the Congolese government suspended "all agreements" with Rwanda. It also accused Uganda of allowing M23 to take over the town and terminated its military cooperation with it. The Ugandan government retaliated by halting Operation Shujaa.

MONUSCO began to prepare its local troops to support the efforts of the Congolese security forces to retake the town, while FARDC troops launched a counterattack from Kabindi on 16 June, and later claimed that they had recaptured Bunagana. However, the city was still in rebel hands on the following day, with heavy fighting taking place to its west. M23 repelled the attack and advanced, capturing the town of Tshengerero and the villages of Bugusa, Kabindi and Rangira. By June 18, the frontline had stabilized along the Rutshuru-Bunagana axis. Combined FARDC-MONUSCO forces still held settlements in the direct vicinity of Tshengerero such as Ntamugenga and Rwanguba, including the latter's bridge over the Rutshuru river. Fighting shifted to the Runyoni-Rumangabo axis, where clashes were reported at the villages of Kavumu and Bikenge. As its offensive moved westward, M23 reopened the Bunagana border post and began developing its own parallel administration in the town.

==== Rutshuru front ====
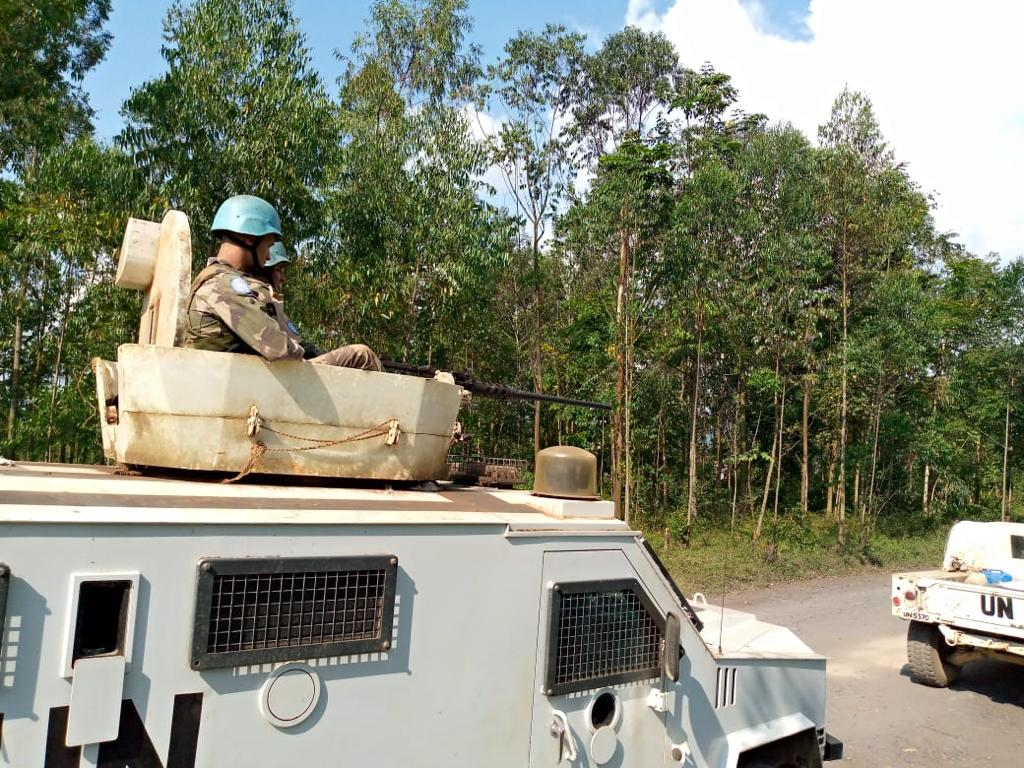
MONUSCO peacekeepers on patrol in Rutshuru Territory, July 2022

From 19 to 22 June, clashes continued as M23 attempted to break through FARDC defense positions. At first, the rebels assaulted villages along the southern axis, but were repelled at Karambi, Kitagoma and Kitovu, Bweza, and Busanza. They subsequently focused on Bikenge, Ruvumu, Shangi, and Bukima, overrunning the villages before the FARDC organized a counterattack, retaking most of these settlements. Human Rights Watch reported that 17 civilians, including two children, had been summarily executed by M23 on 21 June for suspected collaboration with the FARDC. According to the newspaper Eco News, the FARDC reportedly inflicted a defeat on M23 at the Runyoni frontline around this time, wounding Sultani Makenga and killing another rebel commander, Colonel Yusuf Mboneza. Mboneza's death was later disputed by pro-M23 sources. Combat resumed on 28 June as rebels attacked FARDC positions at Bushandaba, Ruseke and the strategic hill of Bikona. Pro-government forces, consisting of the military and police, counter-attacked, and retook the villages of Nkokwe, Ruvumu, Rugarama, Rutakara, Ntamugenga and Rutsiro. On 29 June, the FARDC continued its advance, capturing Kabindi and Chengerero, though M23 militants countered by attacking Rutsiro.

On July 1, the FARDC claimed to have won a major victory over M23 and allied Rwandan troops after heavy fighting at Rutsiro, Ntamugenga and Nyabikona, completely evicting the insurgents from the Bweza groupement in Rutshuru. Clashes continued at Bikenge and Ruseke on 4 July, as the FARDC repelled M23 assaults. On July 6 Rwandan President Paul Kagame and Congolese President Félix Tshisekedi agreed to a ceasefire but M23 refused to adhere to it and attacked Kanyabusoro and Rwanguba the next day. Over the next days, clashes continued at various villages in the Bweza and Jomba groupements, as M23 attempted to retake territory while combat died down along other parts of the frontline.

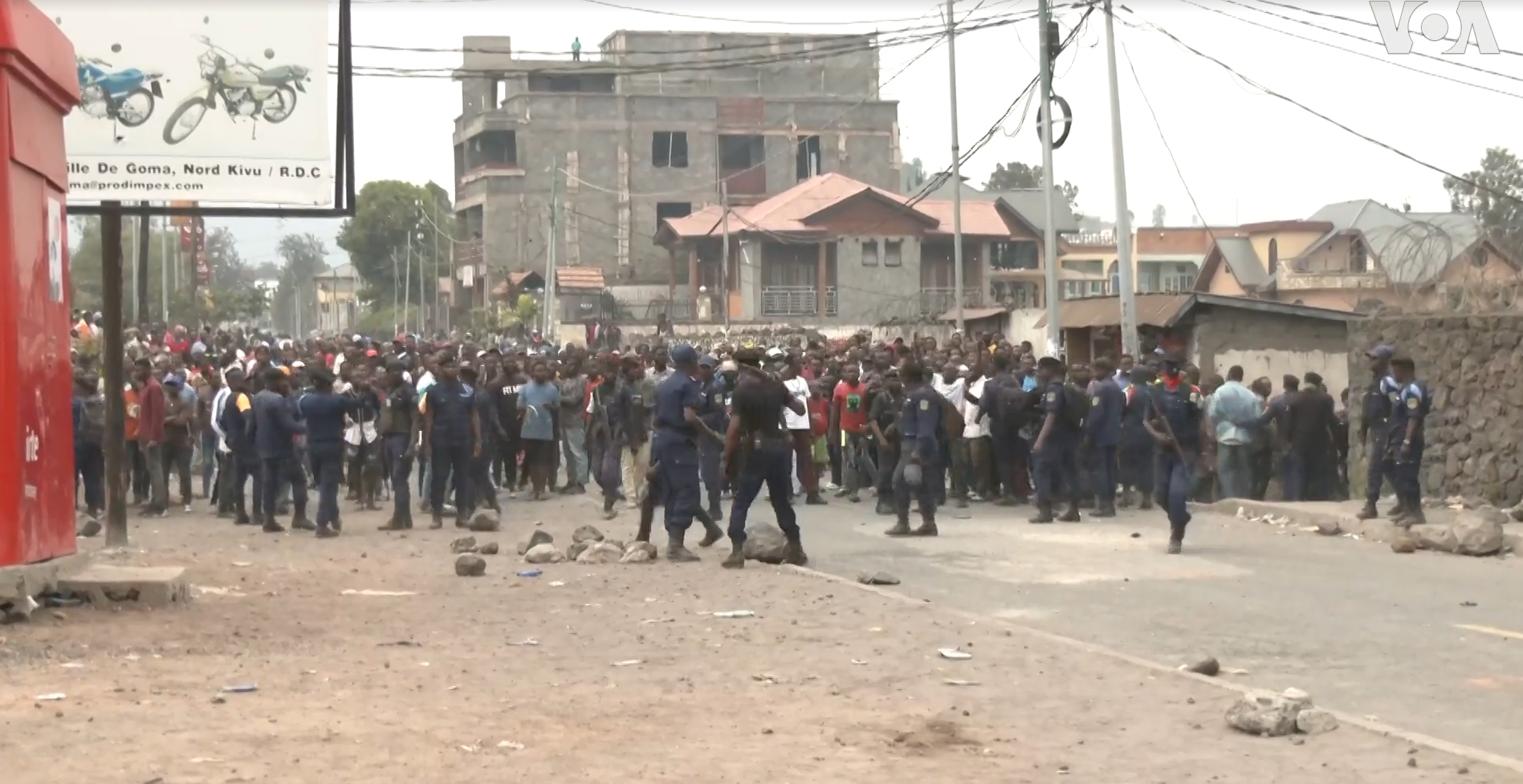
Anti-MONUSCO protests in Goma, July 2022

By the end of July, M23 was installing its own officials in the occupied territories and began raising taxes. In response to M23's advances, violent protests erupted in Goma and other eastern Congolese cities against MONUSCO, killing several people, including peacekeepers. On 27 July, fighting between M23 and FARDC resumed at Kabingo, Rutshuru, as the rebels attempted to harvest the crops planted by locals but were confronted by government forces. On 2 August, the rebels and FARDC fought at five villages in Rutshuru. A truce was later agreed, which was condemned by locals in the area for allowing M23 to keep its territory. On 15 August, the first contingent of East African Community peacekeepers arrived in Kivu. This group, consisting of Burundian soldiers, pledged to assist in the campaign against M23 and other insurgent factions. Sporadic clashes restarted on 16 August, when rebels, allegedly supported by Rwandan troops, attacked Rwanguba, Rangira, and Muhibira in Rutshuru. The M23 leadership claimed that these operations were in response to FARDC aggression, and declared that it wanted a "dialogue" with the government. On 19 August, M23 shelled FARDC positions at Jomba, Bweza and Busanza.

On October 23, M23 captured the town of Ntamugenga as they sought to take the strategic RN2 highway. Four civilians were killed and 40 more were injured in the fighting while more than 23,000 people fled their homes. The offensive continued along the RN2 highway, leading to M23 capturing the towns of Rubare, Kalengera, and Kako. On 29 October M23 rebels took control of the towns of Rutshuru and Kiwanja. Around this time, a Rwandan soldier fighting alongside M23 surrendered to MONUSCO forces.

Riots broke out in Goma against Rwanda and MONUSCO again on October 31. Several MONUSCO vehicles were burned while the United Nations announced a "strategic and tactical withdrawal" from the Rumangabo military base to protect its personnel, allowing M23 to occupy it. Kenya subsequently announced that it would send 900 soldiers to fight against M23. On 7 November, the Congolese military stated they were training 3,000 new recruits to go and fight M23, and soon after began to bomb the rebels with fighter jets. Rwanda protested that a Congolese Air Force Sukhoi Su-25 had violated its airspace. By 15 November 2022, M23 had pushed to the towns of Rugari and Tongo, forcing hundreds of civilians to flee. M23 claimed to have captured the towns of Kibumba, Ruhunda, Buhumba, Kabuhanga, Tongo, and Mulimbi from the FDLR who they accused of working with the Congolese army. By late November, the FARDC had formed a coalition with several local militias, including the FLDR, Mai-Mai groups, and some Nyatura factions.

==== Expansion through North Kivu ====
A MONUSCO investigation documented massacres committed by M23 in November killed at least 171 civilians in the Tongo and Bambo groupements of Bwito Chiefdom. The victims included men, women and children. On 23 December, M23 was forced by heavy international pressure to officially hand over Kibumba to the EAC Regional Force. Despite this, their withdrawal was only partial; the insurgents maintained a presence in the town's outskirts. FARDC declared the alleged handover of Kibumba a "sham", intended to distract from M23's attempts to advance in other areas. On 28 December 2022, South Sudan sent a contingency of 750 troops to join the East African Contingency to be stationed in Goma. Over the next weeks, heavy fighting took place between M23 and a number of rival militias allied to FARDC, including APCLS which declared its aim to capture Bwiza from the rebels. Meanwhile, M23 captured several villages and the town of Nyamilima near the Ugandan border.

In January, clashes continued even as M23 declared its intention to surrender the Rumangabo military base to the EAC Regional Force. On 24 January a Congolese Su-25 was damaged by ground fire from Rwanda after Rwanda said it violated its airspace. On 27 January M23 captured the town of Kitshanga, causing people to flee and take refuge in a nearby UN base. Kitshanga's capture cut off the road linking Butembo, North Kivu's second largest city, to Goma. After two days of heavy fighting, M23 seized the village of Mushaki on 24 February, threatening supply routes to Goma. Three days later M23 briefly took the town of Rubaya and its coltan mines, before being expelled by the FARDC. The next day, the town of Mweso also fell to the rebels. By March, the violence had resulted in 100,000 displaced civilians.

On April 3, Ugandan EAC soldiers entered Bunagana. However, instead of replacing M23, the peacekeepers coexisted with the rebels. Such an arrangement was also observed at Rumangabo, where Kenyans and M23 inhabited the same base, and along the Sake-Mwesso axis, where Burundian and rebel forces operated next to each other. In addition, local sources suggested that M23 had begun to arm and train other militias. In October 2023, the DRC ordered the EAC force in the country to leave by 8 December, due to a "lack of satisfactory results on the ground". On 26 October, the M23 rebels launched an offensive on Bambo, seizing the town, while fighting closed in on Goma. On 4 February 2024, M23 seized the town of Shasha, adjacent settlements, and was in control of the road linking Goma to Minova. The M23 rebels then began advancing on the town of Sake, located at a strategic crossroad linking Goma to the west.

=== 2025 Goma and Bukavu offensives ===
==== Encirclement of Goma ====
On January 4, M23 seized Masisi, a town with a population of 40,000 and the administrative seat of Masisi Territory. Agence France-Presse said that M23 forces had previously captured the Katale area before entering Masisi. The same day, M23 forces began moving west to retake Rubaya, a key area for the extraction of coltan, a mineral vital to global technology supply chains. The FARDC stopped the initial M23 assault on its newly established positions in Ngungu, in the Mupfuni-Shanga groupement. FARDC then conducted airstrikes in Mbingi, a region it was expected to control but failed to maintain for more than a day due to M23 reinforcements. The following day, M23 fighters based in Mulimbi launched an assault on the Wazalendo stronghold within the Tongo groupement of Bwito Chiefdom. During an ambush by Wazalendo near Kiseguro, located in the Binza groupement in Rutshuru Territory, five M23 fighters were killed. Heavy fighting lasted several hours after the ambush, particularly in the localities of Kiseguro and Ngwenda, where Wazalendo forces engaged in combat with M23 troops.

On 19 January, M23 captured the mineral-rich towns of Lumbishi and Changue in Kalehe Territory, marking M23's first incursions into South Kivu province. On 20 January, M23 launched a series of bombings targeting hills overlooking Sake in the Kamuronza groupement of Masisi Territory, which targeted FARDC and Wazalendo positions, primarily affected the locality of Kimoka near the Lushagala refugee camp. Despite the intensity of the attacks, M23 was repelled. However, later that evening, M23 forces captured Minova after intense fighting in Masisi Territory. Minova became the first significant town in South Kivu to fall to M23. Strategic vantage points such as Katale, Kachiazo, and the hills overlooking Minova were occupied. M23 forces then moved toward Kasunyu, a route leading to both Goma and Rwanda, effectively cutting off a critical supply route to Goma. The rebels also advanced toward Kalungu, located 7 kilometers from Minova, with the potential to reach Nyabibwe, another mining hub. The axis also pointed toward Kavumu, home to a regional airport. Bweremana was taken by M23 following an artillery assault against FARDC forces.

By 22 January, M23 had entrenched itself within Minova and Kalungu in the Buzi groupement and expanded its dominion to Makelele and Butale in the Mbinga-Nord groupement. On 23 January, intensified clashes erupted as M23 launched a pre-dawn offensive against FARDC and Wazalendo positions near Sake. Seven South African soldiers of the SADC were killed in the fighting. MONUSCO mobilized reinforcements to fortify defenses around Sake and Goma but remained absent in Minova due to mandate restrictions. Simultaneous attacks by M23 targeted Wazalendo and FARDC positions 20 kilometers north of Goma.

By late January, fighting intensified around Sake as M23 launched several assaults to take it. Multiple MONUSCO peacekeepers were wounded defending the area around the town while Major General Peter Cirimwami Nkuba, the military governor of North Kivu, was injured in the fighting and later died of his wounds. Hundreds of civilians became casualties amid the ensuing battle along with two Malawian Defence Force peacekeepers killed defending to town. Sake was taken by M23 on January 23, rendering Goma encircled. As M23 advanced toward the city, six more United Nations peacekeepers and nine South African soldiers were killed trying to repulse them.

==== Battle of Goma ====
As an M23 assault on Goma became imminent, the FARDC deployed tanks at strategic spots in the city to defend it. At Goma International Airport, Romanian military instructors coordinated with FARDC forces and Wazalendo units to bolster security. M23 issued an ultimatum demanding the surrender of FARDC forces and imposed a 48-hour deadline, which led to some soldiers relinquishing their arms before the deadline expired. Some residents fled the city by using boats to cross Lake Kivu. M23 commenced its attack on the city on January 25, assaulting its northern and western outskirts while Rwandan forces attacked from Rwanda itself. Assisted by MONUSCO, Wazalendo militias, and mercenaries from Romania, the Congolese army put up a stiff resistance fending off M23 in the northern neighborhoods in order to defend the routes leading to Goma's airport. Similar "unexpected resistance" was put up in the west. By the next day, M23 had broken through FARDC defenses in the city's Monigi district and began pushing toward the city center.

With the city breached, FARDC defenses crumbled. M23 quickly captured strategic neighborhoods around the airport as Congolese soldiers began to flee to peacekeeping bases or into Rwanda where they surrendered. On January 27, M23 announced the city's capture but scattered resistance among Wazalendo militias continued in various neighborhoods while remaining FARDC soldiers and MONUSCO peacekeepers held out at the airport which M23 besieged. The next day, the airport was surrendered and M23 took 1,200 FARDC soldiers captive. MONUSCO forces promptly raised a white flag and surrendered afterward. By January 30, fighting had stopped as M23 mopped up any remaining resistance in the city. The United Nations estimated that nearly 3,000 people were killed in the battle.

==== Push into South Kivu ====
The city's fall sparked large-scale riots in Kinshasa. Crowds gathered outside embassies demanding stronger international action and the immediate withdrawal of M23 from the Congo. Congolese President Tshisekedi called for a national mobilization, urging citizens to rally behind FARDC against what he called "Rwanda's barbaric aggression". With Goma captured, M23 turned its attention to South Kivu and its capital Bukavu, launching an offensive into the province's Kalehe Territory and capturing the towns of Kiniezire and Mukwidja after intense skirmishes. The next day, M23 confronted FARDC troops in the village of Kalangala. Strategically positioned between Mukwidja and Nyabibwe, it was the gateway to the territory's administrative town of Kalehe. On January 31, FARDC launched a counterattack, retaking Mukwidja and adjacent localities but clashes persisted in other nearby areas, while FARDC confirmed that clashes had spread beyond Nyabibwe. The United Nations reported that over 700 people died in the fighting within Kalehe Territory thus far.

On February 1, FARDC retook Nyabibwe and forced M23 to retreat toward Minova but its commanding officer Alexis Rugabisha was killed in action. Two days later, M23 announced a unilateral ceasefire but reports indicated that M23 was reinforcing its positions with additional troops and equipment in Kalehe Territory. On February 4, M23 relaunched its offensive, retaking various villages and the town of Mukwija, followed by Nyabibwe. On February 10, M23 launched artillery strikes on FARDC positions, while intense fighting in the area forced about 30,000 people to flee their homes. M23 captured Kalehe two days later and went on to consolidate control over much of Kalehe Territory. M23 forces then entered Kabare Territory on February 13. On 14 February, M23 occupied all of Kalehe and made inroads into Kabare territories, forcing the Congolese army to withdraw toward the town of Kavumu where they made a stand at its local airport. By midday, M23 had successfully overrun the airport, 30 kilometers from Bukavu, despite significant resistance from FARDC. M23 then promptly marched on Bukavu on February 15. Unlike in Goma, M23 faced little resistance taking the city but its capture forced over 10,000 refugees into Burundi.

=== Secondary offensives and ceasefire ===
==== Lubero front ====
Concurrent with M23's offensives on Goma and Bukavu was a minor theater in Lubero Territory, North Kivu, where they attempted to capture the province's second largest city of Butembo. Goma's seizure freed up M23's forces to march north where on February 18, they engaged FARDC forces in an attempt to capture the territory's administrative town of Lubero. M23 captured the town of Kipese on February 20 while flanking FARDC positions along the RN2 highway but was prevented from taking Lubero itself. Unable to break FARDC defenses, M23 moved west and captured the village of Kasugho, located southwest of Lubero, on March 2 while also taking various settlements along the shores of Lake Edward by May 2.

In response to M23's advances, Uganda intervened and sent its military into the Congo to secure areas of North Kivu still under government control and neighboring Ituri Province. Taking up positions south of Lubero, the Ugandan military stopped M23 from progressing any further.

==== Uvira front ====
After securing Bukavu, M23 swiftly marched south along the N5 highway toward the strategic city of Uvira, located near the border with Burundi. FARDC, now suffering from crippling morale, hastily attempted to build new defensive lines but faced resistance from Wazalendo militias who were opposed to abandoning Bukavu. The resulting infighting left 17 people dead on February 19. Marching unopposed through the Ruzizi Plain, M23 captured the towns of Kamanyola and Sange. Residents, fearing potential violence, fled into the mountains. In response, Burundian forces withdrew from the area back into Burundi. By March 12, M23 had reached to within 20 miles (32 km) from Uvira but then withdrew back to Kamanyola after facing international pressure and showing support for a peace conference mediated by Angola. As a de facto ceasefire set in, M23 took Idjwi Territory without a fight and now had a presence in seven out of eight of South Kivu's territories.

In South Kivu's Fizi Territory, two ethnic Banyamulenge militias called Twirwaneho and RED-Tabara aligned themselves with M23 and began attacking Congolese positions, taking the village of Minembwe and its airstrip and Mikenge on February 21. The Congolese military responded by launching an operation to retake them, saying drone strikes killed four Twirwaneho commanders. Fighting quickly spread to neighboring Walungu and Mwenga territories. After heavy fighting, Congolese soldiers retook Mikenge on March 6 while it utilized airstrikes against Twirwaneho positions around Minembwe.

==== Walikale front ====
On March 6, FARDC and Wazalendo militias attempted a surprise assault to retake Masisi from M23, which had been occupied since 2024. The attack failed and M23 responded by launching a counteroffensive west toward Walikale, the administrative capital of Walikale Territory in North Kivu. A mining hub rich in raw materials, it has been a contested area throughout the Kivu conflict. Moving from Masisi, M23 quickly marched west along the R529 highway. M23 captured the village of Kibati on March 13 and then Kibua three days later after fighting off FARDC and Wazalendo assaults. Receiving reinforcements, FARDC counterattacked, pushing M23 back down the R529. Days of fighting for control of the town of Mpofi and surrounding villages ensued, ending in M23 victory. Retreating to Walikale, FARDC set up one last defensive position outside the town but were overwhelmed and dispersed. M23 captured Walikale on March 19, marking their furthest westward advance.

During negotiations in Qatar that same day, Congolese President Tshisekedi and Rwandan President Kagame agreed to a ceasefire. M23 responded by agreeing to withdraw from Walikale, citing it as an effort to "promote conditions for peace initiatives and political dialogue".

==== Peace agreement ====
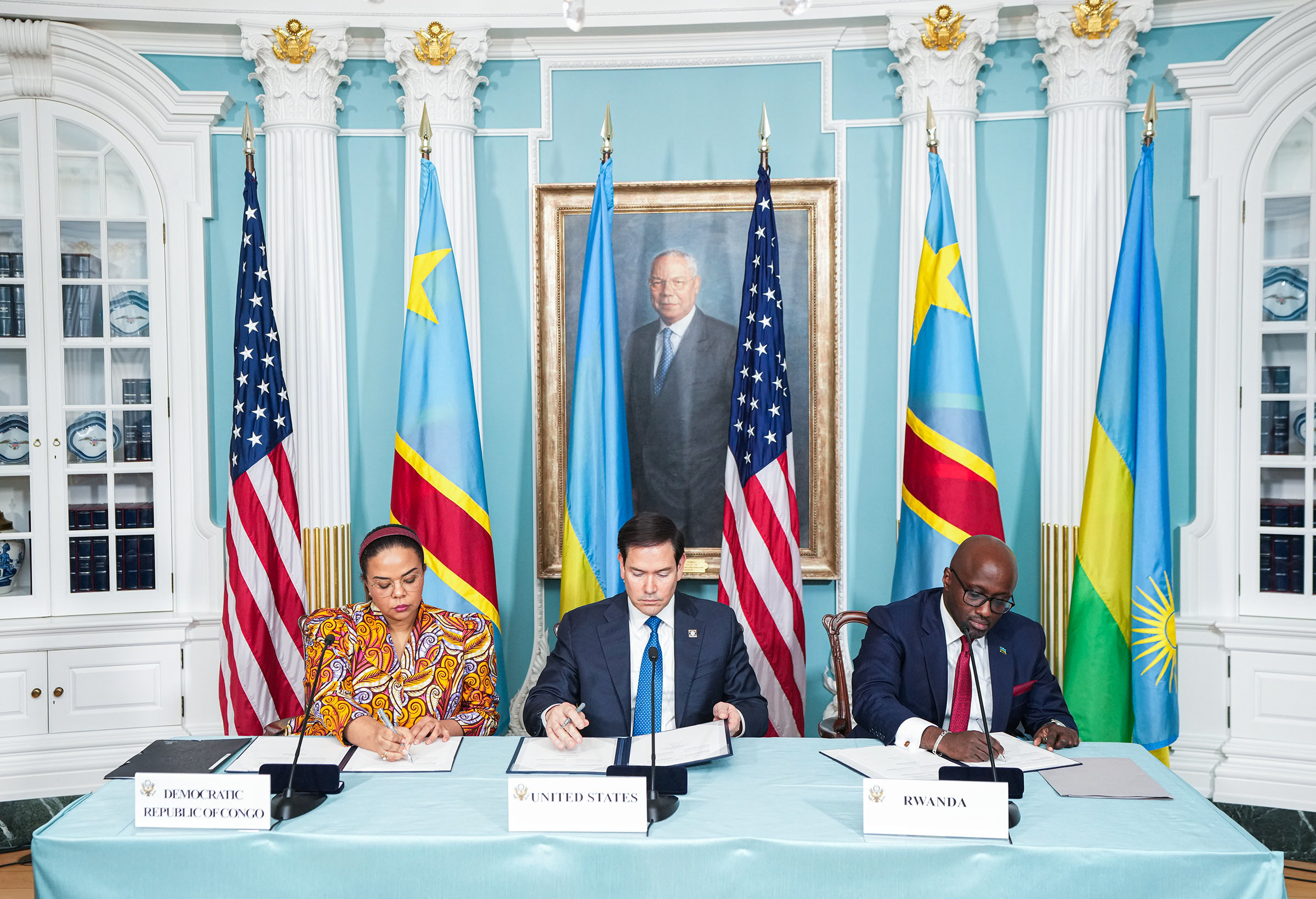
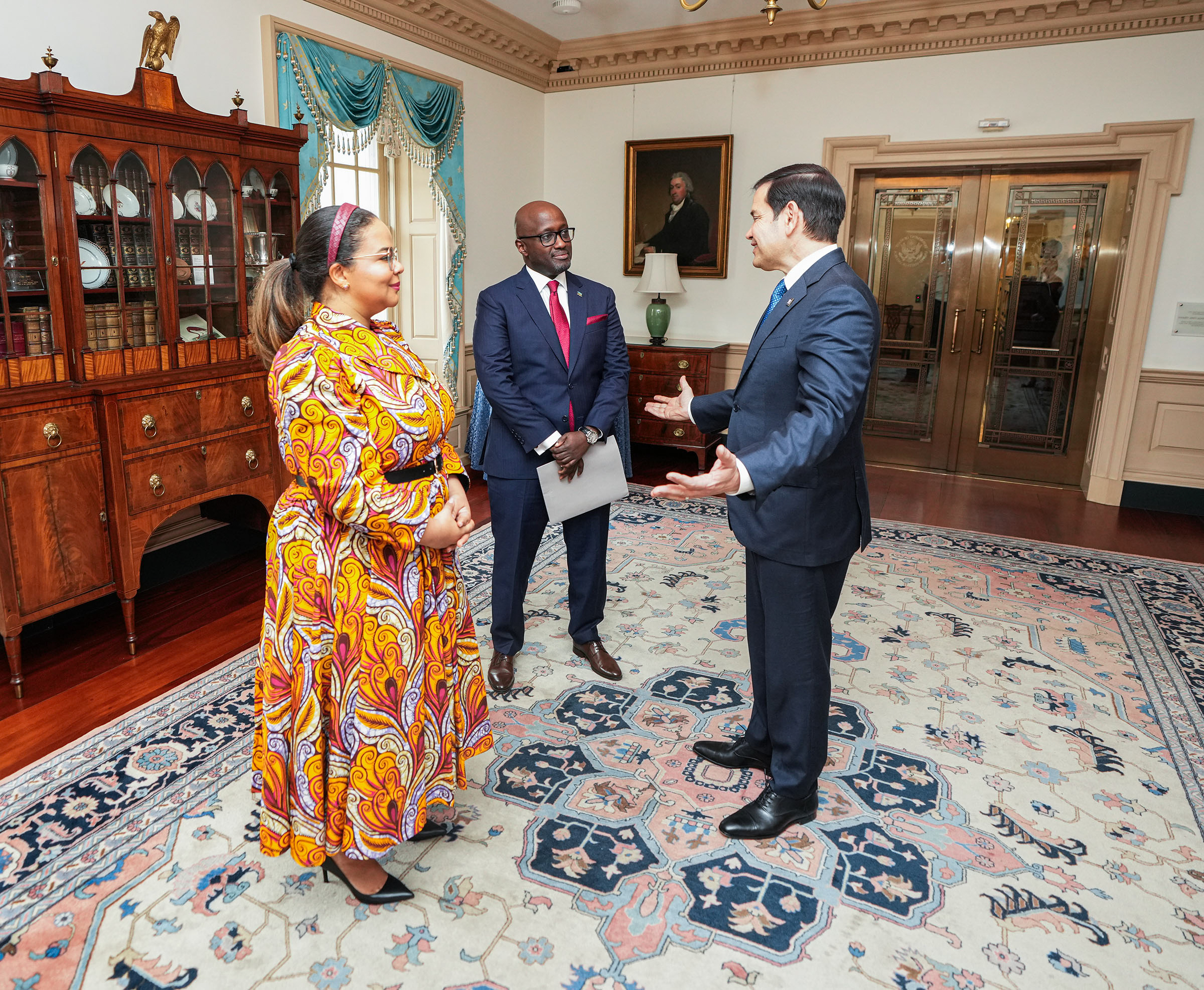
US Secretary of State Marco Rubio presiding over a Declaration of Principles signing ceremony with Congolese Foreign Minister Thérèse Kayikwamba Wagner and Rwandan Foreign Minister Olivier Nduhungirehe at the U.S. Department of State in Washington, D.C., on 25 April 2025

On April 27 in Washington, D.C., the DRC and Rwanda jointly ratified a declaration of principles aimed at establishing a lasting peace, pledging to mutually recognize each other's sovereignty, address security issues, and promote economic integration, the return of displaced people, support for MONUSCO, and drafting a peace agreement. The document was signed by Congolese Foreign Minister Thérèse Kayikwamba Wagner and Rwandan Foreign Minister Olivier Nduhungirehe, with U.S. Secretary of State Marco Rubio in attendance. Rubio stressed the importance of these pledges for achieving peace and economic growth in the region, noting that sustainable peace would be conducive to increased foreign investment. Both parties agreed to submit a preliminary peace agreement by 2 May.

Despite the peace deal, M23 continued to fight Wazalendo militias conducting guerilla attacks. On 29 April, SADC troops began withdrawing from Goma via the Grande Barrière following an M23 ultimatum demanding their exit from rebel-held areas. On 27 June, the DRC and Rwanda signed a U.S.-mediated peace agreement in Washington, attended by Secretary of State Marco Rubio. Foreign Ministers Thérèse Wagner and Olivier Nduhungirehe formalized the accord, concluding months of diplomatic negotiations aimed at reducing tensions and conflict in eastern DRC. However, the accord did not halt M23's military activities. On 28 June, rebel forces captured the center of Kaniola following renewed clashes with Wazalendo. Even after signing the Doha Declaration of Principles, which underscored commitments to peaceful dialogue, recognition of Congolese sovereignty, and respect for international law, M23 persisted in carrying out its campaign. Throughout July, August, and September, M23 operations persisted across North and South Kivu, including forced displacements, civilian killings, and the expansion of rebel control into mining zones and strategic localities. On 5 September, the UN accused the "Rwanda-backed rebels" of slaughtering children and other civilians in Congo.

The front lines largely remained frozen from March to December 2025. M23 may have quadrupled its active troops since early 2025, with an estimate in October putting its force at 22,000 fighters, making it the largest DRC rebellion since the Second Congo War. Burundi, which sees the advance of Rwandan-backed rebels in South Kivu as an existential threat due to the region's proximity to its economic center Bujumbura, deployed additional troops in May and started building up defenses in November. M23 militarized the areas south of Bukavu along National Road 5 with additional troops and equipment in late November. Burundi's foreign minister claimed that Rwanda sent "trucks full of soldiers" from 28 November to reinforce its 8,000 troops in South Kivu.

=== Renewed conflict ===
==== Second Uvira offensive ====
On December 1, M23 relaunched its offensive toward Uvira from its forward position at Kamanyola. The strategic town of Lubarika fell to the group the next day, and separate attacks were launched towards Luvungi, a key FARDC stronghold. Congolese soldiers, assisted by Burundian forces, counterattacked on the same day, pushing M23 back from the town. M23 brought reinforcements from Bukavu and the Lake Kivu area and attacked again, breaking through FARDC defenses to take Luvungi on December 4. FARDC troops retreated south to Luberizi as M23 advanced toward Uvira, which was made the temporary capital of South Kivu after the fall of Bukavu, and the province's last major settlement outside of rebel control. M23 expanded its control of surrounding areas as Congolese and Burundian troops retreated amidst reports of increasing casualties, including the latter's commander. Infighting among FARDC forces and Wazalendo militias in the town of Sange triggered a collapse in government defenses and it was captured by M23 on December 8. As a disorderly withdrawal took place, Burundi ordered all its troops to return to the country and defend its border. FARDC, Wazalendo, and Burundian troops began fleeing "en masse" from Uvira. M23 fighters entered the city on late 9 December and announced it under their total control on the next day. Regional authorities and the United Nations said at least 400 people were killed and 200,000 more were displaced in the fighting.

M23 then continued south from Uvira, taking areas around the Itombwe Mountains and clashing with Congolese militias on the plateaus overlooking Fizi Territory. Making their way down the western shore of Lake Tanganyika, M23 took the town of Makobola, site of the infamous 1998–99 massacre, and surrounding villages.

== Analysis ==
=== Rwandan role ===
As a result of the M23 advances in 2022, Bintou Keita, top UN official for the DRC, described the group as having "conducted itself as a conventional army, rather than an armed group," and warned that the group's capabilities exceeded that of MONUSCO. According to United Nations Security Council researchers, the presence of individuals in Rwandan uniforms among the rebels has been proven through photos and drone footage, partially explaining the M23 forces' increased professionalism. Congolese researcher Josaphat Musamba concurred, arguing that it was "clear that there is support" behind M23's resurgence. Congo Research Group director Jason Stearns stated that, though there was "no certainty" about Rwanda backing the M23 offensive, the rebels' firepower and various frontline reports made Rwandan involvement "very likely". Regardless of Rwanda's possible role in the offensive, analysts cautioned that M23 had never been just a Rwandan pawn, and always maintained its own agenda.

In early August 2022, a report for the UN by independent researchers provided further evidence about Rwandan support for M23, including photos and videos showcasing Rwandan soldiers moving into Congolese territory and M23 troops armed with Rwandan weaponry. In October, a Rwandan soldier surrendered to MONUSCO at Kiwanja; the Congolese government regarded this as a further proof of Rwandan support for the rebel offensive. By January 2023, the United States, several European countries, and UN experts believed that Rwanda was supporting M23.

By 2025 it was estimated that 4000 to 7000 RDF soldiers were fighting in Congo and had suffered significant casualties. Satellite images also showed significant expansion in the Kanombe military cemetery in Kigali, where at least 600 graves have been dug since the beginning of the offensive.

==== Economic and commercial interests ====
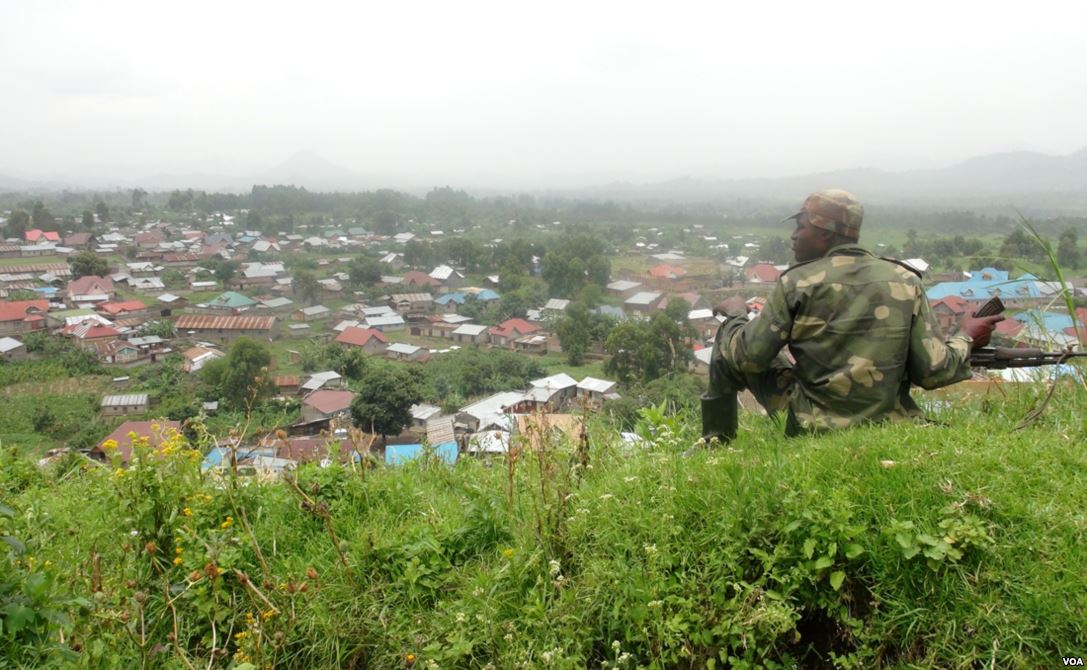
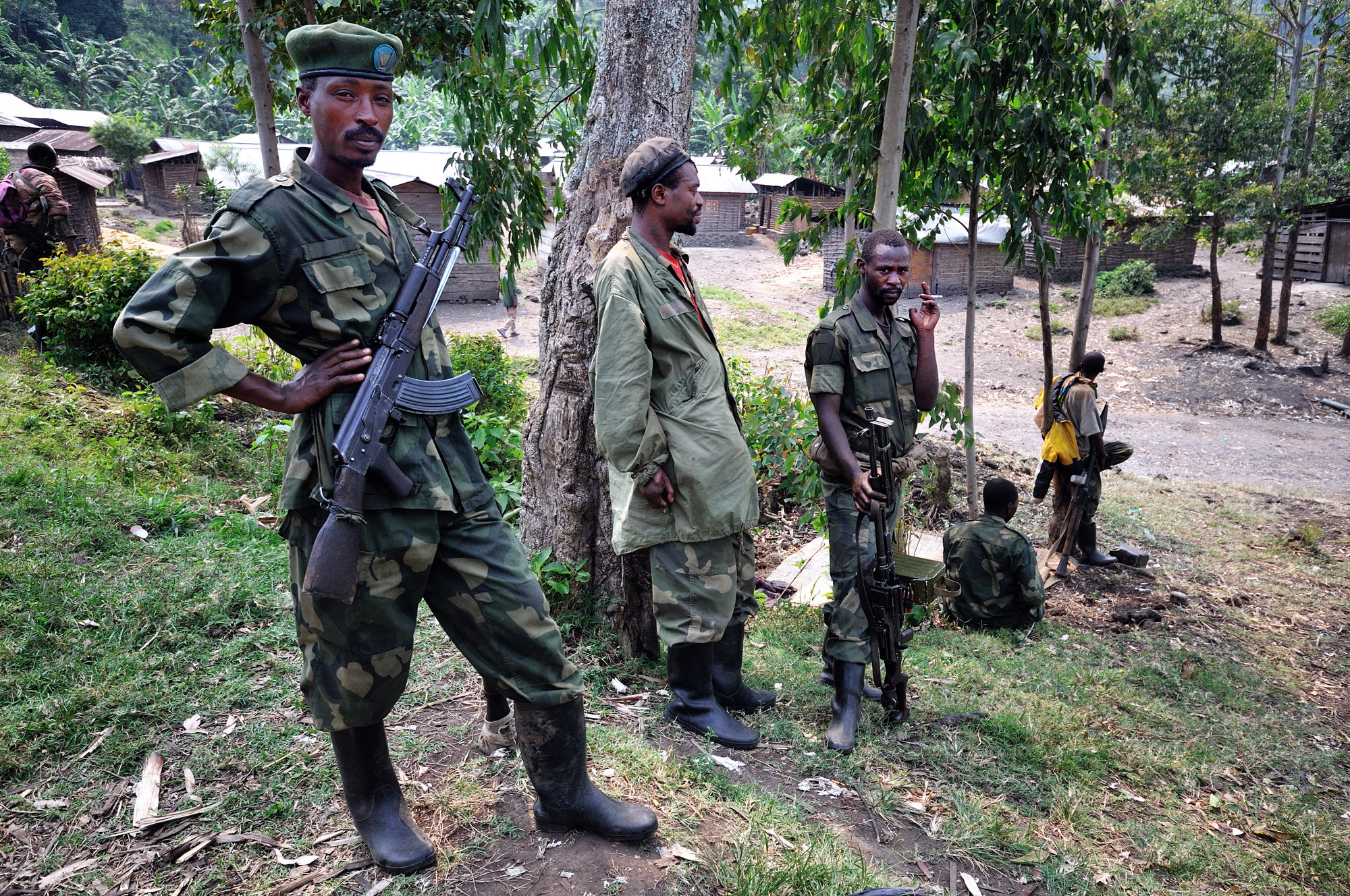
M23 troops in the mining town of Bunagana

Critics argue that both M23 and Rwanda have opportunistically exploited the presence of the FDLR as a pretext for broader political and economic ambitions in eastern DRC, particularly since the FDLR no longer poses a substantial military threat to Rwanda. A December 2023 UNSC-commissioned report revealed that since October 2023, RDF soldiers had been deployed in Nyiragongo, Rutshuru, and Masisi territories, with RDF and M23 receiving support from 250 former FDLR combatants under Rwanda's Defence Intelligence Directorate. There is substantial evidence suggesting that rebel factions backed by Rwanda and Uganda, including M23, control strategic yet informal supply chains that transport valuable minerals from the Kivu region to both countries. The corridor from Bunagana on the Ugandan border, through Kanyabayonga to Goma on the Rwandan border, encompasses a lucrative mining belt containing some of the world's largest deposits of coltan, a mineral essential for the production of electronic devices. The DRC is also the world's largest producer of cobalt, a key component in electric vehicle batteries, which are in high demand globally.

In 2021, U.S. data indicated that Rwanda accounted for 15% of the world's tantalum supply, a derivative of coltan ore, despite producing only modest amounts domestically. In March 2023, Congolese Finance Minister Nicolas Kazadi reported that the country was losing approximately $1 billion annually due to minerals being illicitly smuggled into Rwanda. He noted that Rwanda's 2022 mineral exports, including gold, tin, tantalum, and tungsten, were valued at nearly $1 billion, despite the country having limited known reserves. The U.S. also purchased 36% of its tantalum imports from Rwanda, more than from any other country, while only 7% came from the DRC, a major tantalum producer. Rwanda has utilized an international network of elites to facilitate the smuggling, sale, and monetization of DRC minerals through militarized trade routes. Kigali has received institutional backing to commercialize these minerals via an industry-led compliance framework and companies such as AVX Corporation, KEMET Corporation, and Global Advanced Metals, which manufacture electronic components. These firms have been accused of knowingly purchasing minerals of illicit origin. Due diligence teams from major technology companies, including Apple, Intel, Sony, Motorola, and Lockheed Martin, have also been informed that minerals sourced from Rwanda were likely smuggled from the DRC, often under conditions of violent exploitation. Despite this, these minerals continue to be integrated into global supply chains for products ranging from laptops to aircraft. Rwanda, in turn, has cultivated an image as a stable and efficient trading hub within the mineral sector.

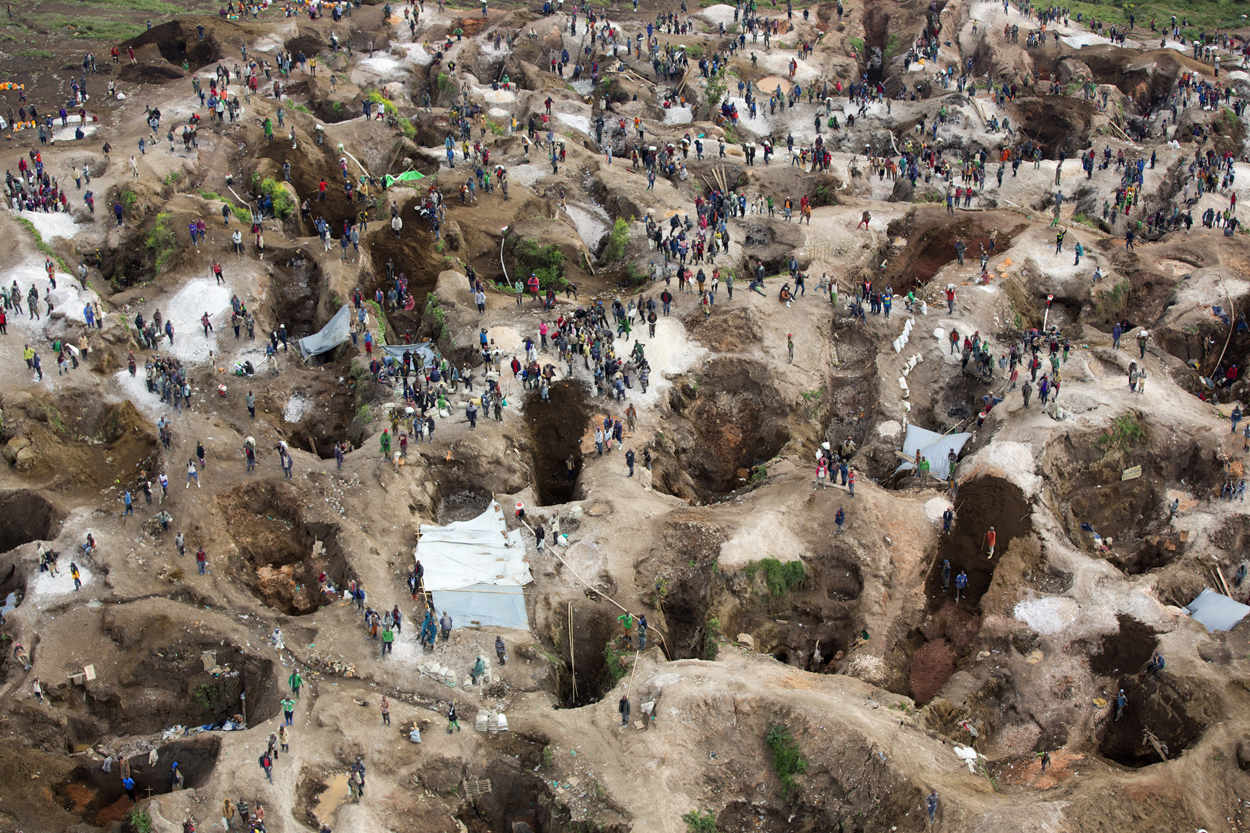
Bibatama Mining Concession, the largest coltan mine in the African Great Lakes region and a major contributor to the country's mining economy, accounting for 15% of global coltan production, has been under M23 control since April 2024.

On 30 April 2024, M23 and RDF forces seized key mining areas in southern Masisi Territory, including Rubaya, one of the world's largest coltan deposits. The group consolidated control over commercial centers in Rubaya and Mushaki and secured key transport routes used to move minerals into Rwanda. This control produced one of the largest recorded infiltrations of ineligible 3T minerals into regional supply chains in the African Great Lakes area in the past decade. M23 established a monopoly over coltan exports from Rubaya to Rwanda as well as prioritized large-scale shipments, and imposed extensive taxation. The group managed every stage of mineral extraction, trade, and transport, and effectively functioned as a parallel governing authority. In Rubaya's commercial zone, it set up a so-called ministry of mineral exploitation that issued permits to miners and traders bearing labels of the "République Démocratique du Congo – Province du Nord Kivu". Annual fees were imposed on miners and traders, while miner wages were doubled to secure continued production. M23 strictly enforced transaction rules and threatened sanctions for violations. Coltan from Rubaya was transported along multiple routes within the DRC, including Bihambwe, Mushaki, Kirolirwe, Kitshanga, Kizimba, Bishusha, Mulimbi, Tongo, Kalengera, and Kibumba. At the Kibumba market in Bwito Chiefdom, loads were frequently transferred to heavy trucks entering from Rwanda, a movement corroborated by satellite imagery. The group also imposed forced labor (salongo) on local populations to build and widen roads used for mineral transport. Reports indicated that convoys operated routinely, shipping several tons of coltan each week, approximately 120 tons per month, while AFC-M23 collected taxes and in-kind payments that generated an estimated $800,000 monthly from Rubaya's coltan trade. Once exported via Rwanda, smuggled coltan entered global supply chains through international traders and refiners. Customs records reviewed by Global Witness show that Traxys, a Luxembourg-based multinational commodities firm, purchased 280 tonnes of coltan from Rwanda and was nearly the sole buyer from Rwandan exporter African Panther Resources Limited. African Panther's coltan exports surged to unprecedented levels in 2024, surpassing the combined total recorded over the previous four years. This spike coincided with the intensification of the conflict in North Kivu and increased smuggling from Rubaya, which indicates that a substantial share of African Panther's 2024 exports likely originated from conflict zones in the DRC. Traxys significantly increased its purchases of Rwandan coltan in 2023 and became one of Rwanda's largest buyers in 2024, despite clear evidence by late 2023 that conflict coltan from Masisi was being systematically smuggled and laundered into supply chains. The laundering of smuggled minerals is facilitated by weaknesses in traceability and certification systems, as multiple investigations have shown that even industry-accepted schemes have at times been used to legitimize minerals of illicit origin. Methods such as blending coltan from different sources or altering its physical appearance have been documented as techniques to obscure provenance.

In a separate but related case, the International Court of Justice (ICJ) ruled in February 2022 that Uganda must pay $325 million to the DRC in reparations for its role in conflicts between 1998 and 2003, which included the deaths of thousands of civilians in Ituri Province, the funding of rebel groups, and the illicit extraction of natural resources such as gold, diamonds, and timber. Since then, gold has become Uganda's leading export, with much of it reportedly originating from DRC mines. Similarly, while the DRC accounted for 40% of the world's coltan output in 2019, substantial amounts are reportedly funneled illicitly into Rwanda, Uganda, and Burundi. UN investigations have found that while most of the DRC's contraband coltan is routed through Rwanda, a notable portion is also transported via Bunagana and Rutshuru into Uganda and through Uvira into Burundi.

==== European Union agreements and controversy ====
In October 2023, the European Union (EU) signed a partnership with the DRC and Zambia to develop raw material supply chains, including infrastructure investment and sustainable resource extraction. The EU stated that securing a stable supply of critical minerals was essential for meeting its green energy and climate goals. In February 2024, the EU announced a similar agreement with Rwanda, aiming to "nurture sustainable and resilient value chains for critical raw materials". The EU's investments in Rwanda's mineral sector between 2021 and 2024 amounted to $260 million. The agreement recognized Rwanda as a key player in global tantalum production, as well as a producer of tin, tungsten, gold, niobium, and potentially lithium and rare earth elements. The EU further praised Rwanda's regulatory environment, stating that it could serve as a hub for mineral processing and value addition. The announcement was met with immediate criticism from the Congolese government and civil society organizations. President Félix Tshisekedi described the deal as a "provocation of very, very bad taste", arguing that it would legitimize mineral smuggling and exploitation. He asserted that the agreement effectively allowed Rwanda to profit from "the blood of our compatriots". DRC Foreign Minister Christophe Lutundula accused the EU of complicity in the "looting and aggression" against the DRC, citing other EU-Rwanda agreements on security and military cooperation. Notably, Rwandan President Paul Kagame himself acknowledged that Rwanda serves as a transit point for smuggled Congolese minerals. He stated that minerals from the DRC pass through Rwanda to destinations including Brussels, Tel Aviv, Russia, and Dubai.

In February 2024, the EU and Rwanda signed a Memorandum of Understanding on Sustainable Raw Materials Value Chains, in which they committed to closer cooperation on integrating and diversifying raw-material value chains, promoting responsible and traceable production aligned with Environmental, Social and Governance (ESG) standards, combating illegal trafficking, mobilizing infrastructure financing, advancing research and innovation, building regulatory and technical capacity, and leveraging the EU's Global Gateway to support investment, skills development, transparency, and structural economic transformation in Rwanda. In February 2025, the European Parliament criticized the EU's insufficient response to the crisis in eastern DRC, while EU foreign ministers declined to impose immediate sanctions on Rwanda over its alleged involvement in the conflict. EU foreign policy chief Kaja Kallas stated that Rwanda had been urged to withdraw its forces and that the raw-materials memorandum would be reviewed. On 17 March 2025, the European Commission imposed restrictive measures on nine individuals and one entity for serious human rights violations and exploitation of the conflict in the DRC, including M23's president Bertrand Bisimwa, recruitment and propaganda chief Désiré Rukomera, Col. John Imani Nzenze, finance deputy Jean-Bosco Nzabonimpa Mupenzi, and North Kivu's M23-appointed governor Joseph Musanga Bahati, as well as on RDF commanders Ruki Karusisi, Major General Eugene Nkubito, and brigadier general Pascal Muhizi for sustaining the conflict, and additionally sanctioned Rwanda Mines, Petroleum and Gas Board (RMB) CEO Francis Kamanzi for illicit conflict-mineral exploitation and the Kigali-based Gasabo Gold Refinery for illegally importing gold from M23-controlled areas of the DRC. It brought together the total EU sanctions related to the DRC to 32 individuals and two entities subject to travel bans, asset freezes, and a prohibition on EU citizens and companies providing them with funds. Luxembourg, where Traxys is headquartered, has reportedly blocked similar sanctions in the past. Despite these actions, a Global Witness investigation concluded that the EU had not established sufficient safeguards to prevent conflict minerals from entering its market. As major donors, the EU and its member states retain significant leverage over Rwanda, and adherence to EU values would necessitate suspending development aid until Rwanda withdraws from the DRC and ceases all backing of M23.

==== Geopolitical and economic rivalry between Rwanda and Uganda ====
In November 2020, the Ugandan construction company Dott Services, a co-financier and developer of road networks linking Uganda and the DRC, entered a joint venture with the Congolese state-owned mining company Société Aurifère du Kivu et du Maniema (Sakima). This agreement granted Dott Services access to strategic mining sites in Maniema Province, an area rich in tin, tantalum, gold, and tungsten. Under the terms of the deal, Dott Services secured a 70% ownership stake, with Sakima retaining 30%. Additionally, Dott Services is committed to establishing a mineral processing facility alongside its infrastructure projects. The company is widely believed to have close ties to Uganda's political elite.

Rwanda has also sought to assert its influence in the region's mining sector. In June 2021, Kagame and Tshisekedi signed an agreement allowing Dither Ltd, a company reportedly linked to the Rwandan military, to refine gold mined by Sakima. The stated objective of the agreement was to curb revenue streams for armed groups operating in the mining sector. However, the DRC suspended the deal in June 2022, citing Rwanda's alleged support for the resurgent M23 rebellion. Ugandan officials have argued that Rwanda's increasing support for M23 was motivated, at least in part, by the disruption of its economic ventures in the DRC. During the M23 offensive in Bunagana on 23 March 2022, Ugandan soldiers intervened to safeguard Dott Services personnel and assets. The incident heightened tensions between Uganda and Rwanda, which accused the other of leveraging M23 for economic gain. In Kampala, officials alleged that Rwandan-backed M23 elements orchestrated the attack to disrupt Uganda's operations in the DRC. Conversely, in Kigali, officials accused Uganda of using M23 affiliates to seize the border town, a crucial transit hub for Dott Services.

=== Motives of M23 ===
Experts argue that M23's motives have neither been consistent over time nor between its members. Some identified motives include, but are not limited to, genuine worries for aggression against Congolese Tutsi, territorial expansion and land rights, profit incentives primarily from mineral extraction, evasion of arrest, and desire for power. Since its 2022 resurgence, the M23 have stated their concern for Tutsi populations and dismay regarding corruption within the Congolese government. Some expert communities argue M23 invoked these worries to both obscure from their other motivations and distract from war crimes which contradict their stated aims; other communities argue that these motivations, rooted in colonial history, remained true for many fighters and, therefore, can not be discounted.

Stearns argued that the new M23 offensive was possibly aimed at enforcing the group's inclusion in a disarmament, demobilisation, and reintegration (DDR) programme. Previous attempts of M23 at becoming part of this process, including after the 2013 agreement, failed due to considerable opposition by the Congolese public. One of the issues hampering any attempts to achieve M23's complete demobilisation is the fact that several members of the rebel group are known to have committed various war crimes over several years of involvement in insurgencies, even before M23 itself had emerged. This makes their integration into the Congolese security forces or rewarding them with amnesties difficult to justify in the DR Congo.

=== War crimes ===
On 6 August 2025, the OHCHR reported that between 9 and 21 July, M23 forces, aided by the RDF, killed at least 319 civilians in North Kivu, including 48 women and 19 children, most of whom were farmers camping in their fields.
