= Miguel Mumbere Masaisai =

Congolese cyclist (2003–2026)

Miguel Mubere Masaisai

Personal information
- Born: 16 August 2003 Goma, Democratic Republic of the Congo
- Died: 18 September 2026 (aged 23) Ouésso, Republic of the Congo

Cycling career
- Sport: Cycling

Miguel Mumbere Masaisai (16 August 2003 – 18 September 2026) was a Congolese cyclist.

Mumbere was known for taking several long-distance treks across Africa, including a route of approximately 7000 kilometers through Rwanda, Tanzania, Zambia, Botswana, and Namibia. On 1 May 2026, he began a new journey called "Pedals for Peace", where he would cycle from Goma to Rabat to promote unity and raise awareness about the Kivu conflict.

On 18 September 2026, Mumbere died after a collision with a car on his journey while in Ouésso, Republic of the Congo. He was 23.
