= Ntamugenga =

- Location within Democratic Republic of the Congo
- Coordinates: 1.260°S 29.433°E
- Country: Democratic Republic of the Congo
- Province: North Kivu
- Territory: Rutshuru Territory
- Time zone: UTC+2 (CAT)

Ntamugenga is a location in North Kivu, Democratic Republic of the Congo. As of July 2012 it is under the control of the March 23 Movement.
