= Anti-MONUSCO protests =

2022 protests in the DR Congo

- Anti-MONUSCO protests in the DR Congo; Part of the Kivu conflict
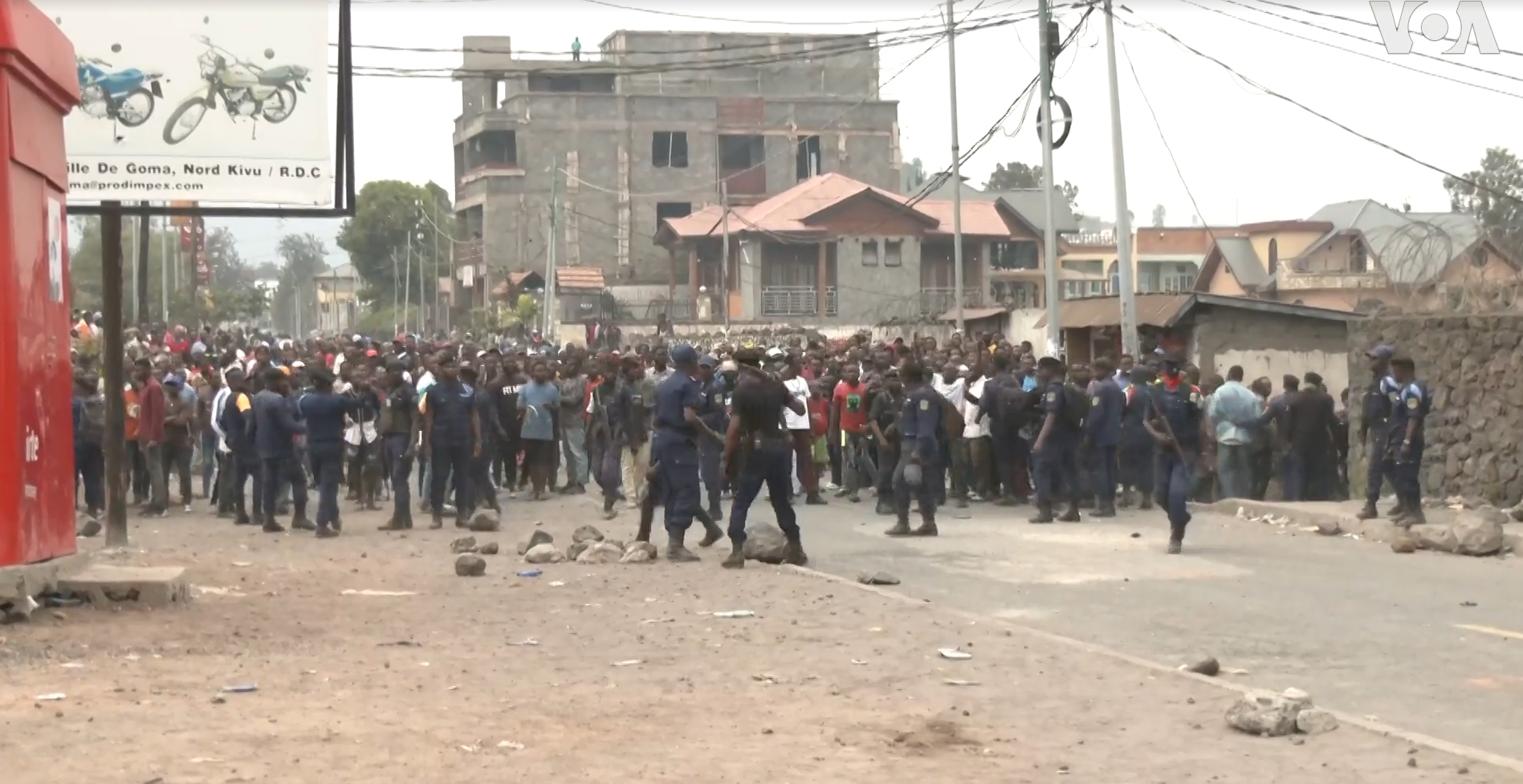
- Anti-MONUSCO protests in Goma in July 2022.
- Date: 25 July – c. 1 August 2022
- Location: Democratic Republic of the Congo
- Goals: Withdrawal of MONUSCO from the Democratic Republic of the Congo
- Methods: Protests; Vandalism; Looting

Parties
| Anti-MONUSCO protestors March 23 Movement (alleged by The North Africa Post) | MONUSCO; Congolese National Police |

Lead figures
| Uncentralized | António Guterres; Constant Ndima Kongba |

Casualties
- Deaths: 36 overall
- Injuries: 170 overall

In late July 2022, anti-MONUSCO protests manifested in the Democratic Republic of the Congo. The protests were against MONUSCO, the United Nations' peacekeeping force in the country, which has been accused by Congolese politicians and civilians of failing to take action to end the decades-old conflict within the country. The protestors demanded that MONUSCO leave the country.

== Protests ==
On 25 July 2022, protests began in the Congolese city of Goma against MONUSCO, which the protestors accused of failing to take action to end the decades-old conflict within the country, and more protests later manifested the following day in Beni and Butembo. According to MONUSCO, protestors stole weapons from the police, and vandalized and looted UN facilities, forcing UN personnel to evacuate the MONUSCO headquarters in Goma via a helicopter airlift. The newspaper The North Africa Post alleged that March 23 Movement rebels had used the unrest as a cover, and been responsible for the attack on a contingent of Moroccan MONUSCO peacekeepers at Nyamilima during the protests.

== Deaths ==
According to Congolese government spokesperson Patrick Muyaya, five people were killed and a further 50 more were injured in Goma. Colonel Paul Ngoma, the police chief of Butembo, stated that seven people were killed in the city, and MONUSCO stated that one peacekeeper and two BSF police officers were also killed in Butembo. On 27 July, four protestors were electrocuted by an electrical cable which was downed by UN soldiers.

On 31 July, two people were killed and fifteen were injured in Beni when UN soldiers opened fire at a Congolese border post, forcing their way into the country from Uganda. A UN representative stated that the soldiers in question were arrested pending an investigation into the incident. By 1 August, two Moroccan peacekeepers, namely Chief Corporal Azzouz Zhenadi and Major Mohammed Rami, and two Indian policemen, Shishupal Singh and Sanwala Ram Vishnoi, had been killed during the protests.

According to an official report by the DR Congo government, 36 people had been killed and 170 wounded during the protests by August.

== Reactions ==
- United Nations: Farhan Haq, a spokesperson for the United Nations, stated: "He [António Guterres] underscores that any attack directed against United Nations peacekeepers may constitute a war crime and calls upon the Congolese authorities to investigate these incidents and swiftly bring those responsible to justice."
- Democratic Republic of the Congo:
  - Congolese President Félix Tshisekedi mainly condemned the shooting of protesters by MONUSCO members.
  - The party Forces for Renewal condemned the attacks and looting during the protests, and urged the Congolese people to not regard MONUSCO as enemies.

== Aftermath ==
In early August, the government of the Democratic Republic of the Congo expelled UN spokesman Mathias Gillmann from the country, stating that he made "indelicate and inappropriate" statements which led to the high tensions between MONUSCO and the country's citizens. Congolese foreign affairs minister Christophe Lutundula stated that the Congolese government intended to speed up the process of MONUSCO's withdrawal from the country, which was originally planned for 2024.
