= 2025 Kinshasa riots =

Civil unrest in capital city of the DRC

- Date: 28 January 2025 – 29 January 2025 (1 day)
- Location: Kinshasa, Democratic Republic of the Congo
- Caused by: March 23 Movement's (M23) advances in Goma; Rwandan involvement in M23 offensives; Alleged international community complicity and involvement in the offensives
- Methods: Demonstrations, vandalism, arson, looting
- Result: Riots suppressed: Protests banned in Kinshasa

Parties
Government of the Democratic Republic of the Congo: Congolese National Police	DRC protestors

Number
Unknown	Dozens – Hundreds

Casualties
- Death: Unknown
- Injuries: Unknown

The 2025 Kinshasa riots were a series of violent demonstrations that occurred on January 28, 2025 in Kinshasa, the capital of the Democratic Republic of the Congo (DRC). Multiple foreign diplomatic missions, including the embassies of the United States, France, Netherlands, Belgium, Rwanda, Kenya, and Uganda, became targets of civil unrest as protesters expressed their opposition to perceived international inaction regarding M23 rebel advances in eastern DRC.

== Protests and riots ==
The advancement of M23 forces into Goma, the capital of North Kivu and a major regional hub with a population of two million, sparked intense public anger in Kinshasa, particularly directed at nations perceived as failing to intervene in the conflict. Protests conducted on highlighted growing tensions over the international community's response to the ongoing conflict in eastern DRC, with demonstrators specifically calling for increased pressure on Rwanda regarding its alleged support of the M23 rebels. Anger was expressed towards European and neighboring African nations' perceived hypocrisy in demanding peace while continuing to diplomatically support Rwanda, with several protesters calling them complicit in the ongoing violence and humanitarian crisis.

During the demonstrations, protesters targeted multiple diplomatic facilities in Kinshasa. The most significant damage occurred at the embassies of France, Rwanda, and Belgium, where demonstrators engaged in acts of vandalism and arson, setting fires to portions of the diplomatic compounds. The Kenyan and Ugandan diplomatic missions were also targeted during the unrest. Protesters burned tires in the streets and engaged in direct confrontations with security forces. In a security alert, the U.S. Embassy in the Democratic Republic of the Congo reported that large crowds were throwing rocks, attacking vehicles, setting up roadblocks, and setting small fires amid the unrest.

In addition, local markets and supermarkets were looted across the city.

== Response ==
Law enforcement responded to the situation by deploying tear gas and firing warning shots to disperse the crowds. The DRC's Minister of Communications Patrick Muyaya Katembwe addressed the situation on national television, calling for peaceful demonstrations and urging protesters to respect diplomatic infrastructure.

The US Embassy issued guidance to its citizens, recommending they shelter in place before seeking safe departure from the country while commercial travel options remained available. The embassy specifically warned about potential roadblocks and protests affecting routes to airports.

== Reactions ==
The European Union issued a formal condemnation of the embassy attacks, with a spokesperson for EU Foreign Affairs Chief Kaja Kallas emphasizing the necessity of protecting diplomatic missions under the Vienna Convention on Diplomatic Relations. Foreign Minister of France Jean-Noël Barrot specifically addressed the attack on France's embassy, declaring the actions "unacceptable" and assuring that measures were being implemented to protect diplomatic personnel and citizens.

Kenya's Prime Cabinet Secretary and Minister of Foreign and Diaspora Affairs Musalia Mudavadi issued a statement expressing deep concern over the attacks on their embassy offices and personnel, characterizing the incidents as grave violations of international law.
