= Willy Ngoma =

Rwandan military spokesman (1974–2026)

Willy Ngoma (1974 – 24 February 2026) was a Congolese military spokesman for the March 23 Movement.

== Life and career ==
Ngoma was born in 1974. He declared himself Congolese, however other sources claim that he also has Rwandan nationality. He worked in several capacities, including commander and military spokesman of the 23 March Movement.

He had been subject to United Nations Security Council sanctions since February 2024, pursuant to the paragraphs of Resolution 2293 (2016), reaffirmed by paragraph 2 of Resolution 2688 (2023).

On 24 February 2026, Ngoma was killed in the vicinity of Rubaya, North Kivu by a Congolese army drone strike. He was 52.
