= Bweremana =

Village in Masisi Territory, North Kivu

Coordinates: 01°40′35″S 29°01′00″E

- Village
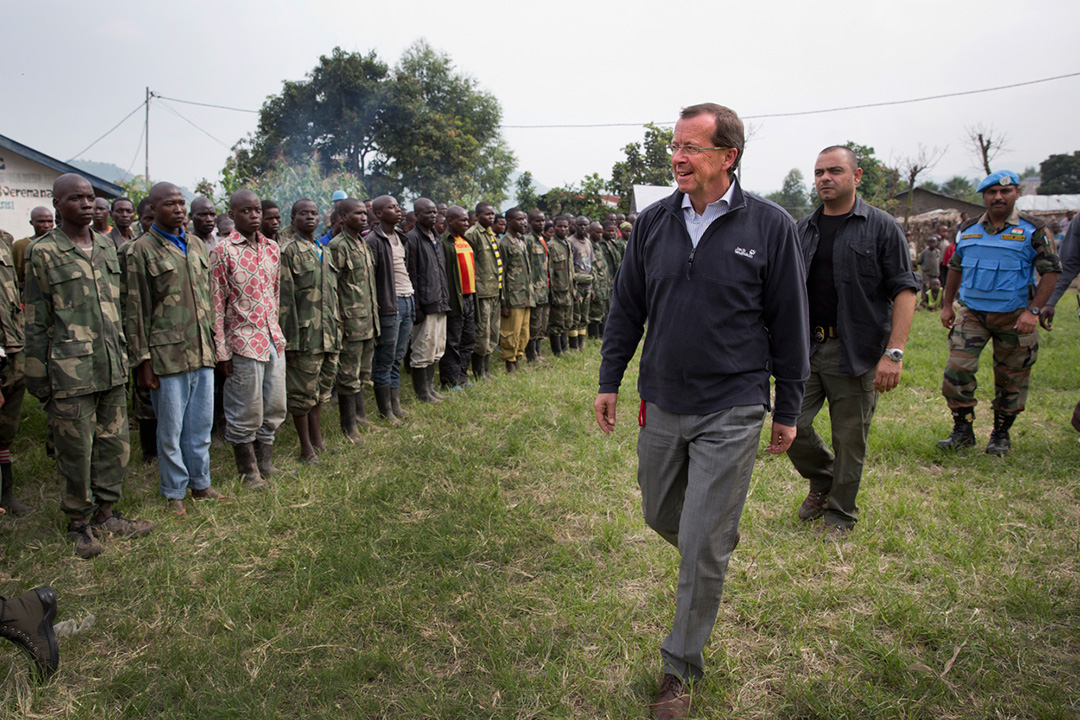
- UN representative Martin Kobler arriving in Bweremana on 18 December 2013, while the town was serving as a transit camp to combatants of armed groups who decided to lay down their arms

- Location within Democratic Republic of the Congo
- Country: Democratic Republic of the Congo
- Province: North Kivu
- Territory: Masisi
- Chiefdom: Bahunde
- Groupement: Mupfuni-Shanga
- Administrative seat: Bweremana Centre

Population (2014 est.)
  - Total: 9,986

Bweremana (also spelled Bweremane) is one of the seven villages that make up the Mupfuni-Shanga groupement, within the Bahunde Chiefdom, in Masisi Territory, North Kivu, Democratic Republic of the Congo. It is bordered to the north by the Kituva village, to the south by Kalehe Territory, to the east by Lake Kivu, and to the west by the villages of Runyana, Kabase, and Kiluku. Bweremana also hosts the administrative headquarters of the Bahunde Chiefdom and had an estimated population of 9,986 as of 2014.

== Geography ==
=== Relief and vegetation ===
The physical landscape of Bweremana consists primarily of mountainous terrain and plains. The mountainous areas include hills and plateaus, while a broad plain extends across the eastern part of the village along the shores of Lake Kivu. Vegetation is largely composed of savanna, although bamboo forests were historically present in the mountainous zones. Much of this bamboo vegetation has declined due to population growth and increasing demand for firewood and building materials.

=== Climate ===
Bweremana experiences two main climatic zones. The first is a high-altitude zone, situated between 2,000 and 3,000 meters above sea level, where temperatures generally range between 15°C and 20°C. The dry season typically occurs from June to August, while the rainy season brings slightly warmer temperatures ranging from 18°C to 25°C.

=== Governance and administration ===
Bweremana is governed by a chef de village (village chief), who is appointed in accordance with customary traditions. The appointment is officially recognized through a decision of the Territory Administrator and the chief is installed by the chef de groupement (group chief) of the Mupfuni-Shanga groupement, in the presence of the mwami (customary chief) of the Bahunde Chiefdom. The chef de village operates under the administrative authority of the chef de groupement.

The village is subdivided into eight sub-villages:

No.	Sub-villages
1.	Bweremana Centre
2.	Nyabibale
3.	Nyamubingwa
4.	Ndumba
5.	Renga
6.	Rueni
7.	Bikenge
8.	Kyabondo

== Demographics ==
=== Population ===
As of 2014, Bweremana's population was estimated at 9,986.

No.	Sub-villages	Men	Women	Boys	Girls	Total
1.	Bweremana Centre	267	405	398	607	1,677
2.	Nyabibale	155	241	230	524	1,150
3.	Nyamubingwa	251	350	301	497	1,399
4.	Ndumba	206	297	246	380	1,129
5.	Renga	147	339	305	391	1,182
6.	Rueni	158	296	213	370	1,037
7.	Bikenge	125	207	291	542	1,165
8.	Kyabondo	235	275	270	467	1,247
Total		1,543	2,410	2,254	3,778	9,986

Source: Report of Bahunde Chiefdom on the demographic statistics of the Congolese population for 2014.

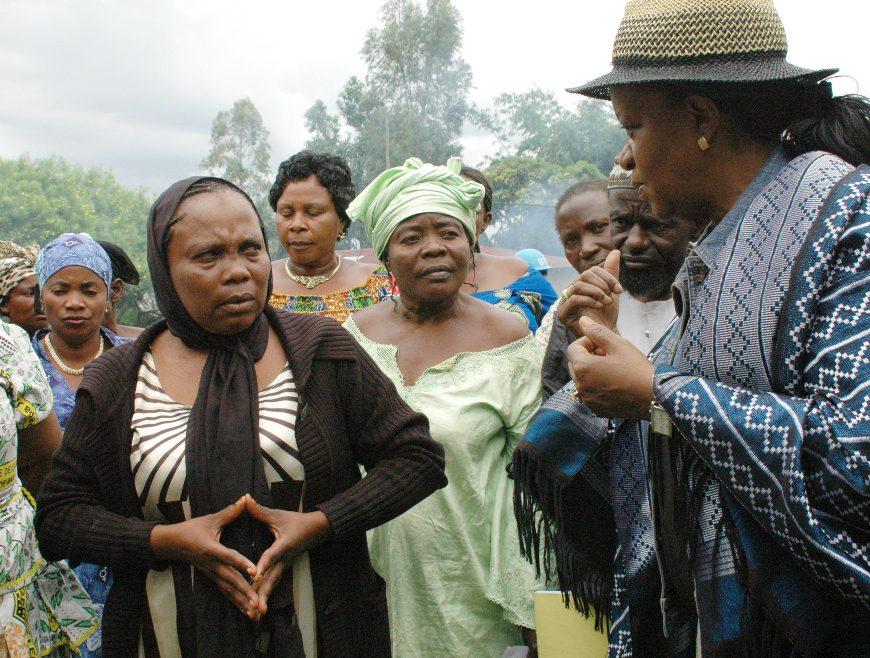
Zainab Bangura (right) engaging with women in Bweremana.

The population mainly consists of two ethnic groups: the Hunde and the Hutu, along with smaller groups such as the Tembo, Havu, and Nande. The Hunde predominantly rely on agriculture, small-scale livestock farming, and, to a lesser degree, artisanal fishing. As landowners, they cultivate crops like bananas (which have nearly disappeared), cassava, and other staple foods. The Hutu, who also depend on agriculture and livestock, settled in the mountainous area, well-suited to their lifestyle, after purchasing land from the Hunde. Other minority groups, such as the Twa and the Tutsi, are also present.

Bweremana also hosts a number of internally displaced persons, though the precise figure is difficult to determine because some residents reportedly register as displaced persons to receive humanitarian assistance. According to the 2004 quarterly report of the civil registry office of the Bahunde Chiefdom, approximately 106 displaced persons were recorded in Bweremana:

Men	Women	Boys	Girls	Total
22	33	17	34	106

These people fled Kamuronza, Ufamandu I, and Ufamandu II groupements, due to worsening insecurity in that area. The displaced population is spread across the eight sub-villages of Bweremana, including Bweremana Centre, Nyamubingwa, Ndumba, Renga, Kyabondo, Rueni, Nyabibale, and Bikenge. Most residents are concentrated in Bweremana Centre, the village's administrative seat, where the majority of political, administrative, and commercial activities happen.

=== Education ===
Bweremana is home to nine primary schools, three secondary schools, and two higher education institutes (instituts supérieurs).

Level of education	Institution
Primary School	Miteetso Primary School
Primary School	Kishongya Primary School
Primary School	Kyabondo Primary School
Primary School	Rweni Primary School
Primary School	Ngerero Primary School
Primary School	Munoza Primary School
Primary School	Mungaza Primary School
Primary School	Kashenda Primary School
Primary School	Renga Primary School
Secondary School	Bweremana Institute
Secondary School	Kashenda Institute
Secondary School	Mupfuni Institute
Higher Institute (instituts supérieurs)	ISEA-Mweso – Bweremana Campus
Higher Institute (instituts supérieurs)	ISP-Matshumbi (which operates as an extension in Bweremana at Lwanga Institute)

=== Health ===
The village has one main health center situated at its administrative headquarters, which oversees four health posts (postes de santé):

- Buyaga Health Post (Poste de santé de Buyaga)
- Renga Health Post (Poste de santé de Renga)
- Kyabondo Health Post (Poste de santé de Kyabondo)
- Kashenda Health Post (Poste de santé Kashenda)

The Bweremana Health Center (Centre de Santé de Bweremana) operates under the Kirotshe Health Zone (Zone de Santé de Kirotshe). Due to the village's large population and ongoing growth, several private clinics and pharmacies have also been established, such as Mbaliphar, Kalamophar, and Kabiphar pharmacies.

=== Religion ===
Christianity is the dominant religion in Bweremana, practiced by about 80% of the population, including Catholics, Protestants, and other denominations. Islam is also practiced, and other new sects continue to appear, often as a result of divisions influenced by personal interests.

== Economy ==
=== Agriculture ===
Agriculture is the primary source of employment, income, food security, and trade. However, rapid population growth and increasing human needs have led to a shortage of arable land, and as a result, soils are often overused and depleted, except in hard-to-reach areas such as rocky and mountainous zones, which remain uncultivated. The main crops include plantains, cassava, beans, sweet potatoes, maize, sorghum, groundnuts, and soybeans.

Food crops	Industrial crops	Livestock	Others
Bananas; Cassava; Beans; Maize; Sweet potatoes; Sorghum; Groundnuts	Arabica coffee	Large and small livestock	Fruits (mangoes, avocados)

Bweremana, along with nearby areas, supplies food and fruit to the cities of Goma and Bukavu. While plantain cultivation was once widespread, it declined sharply after a bacterial wilt outbreak, which allowed cassava to become more dominant.

=== Fishing ===
Fishing is artisanal and practiced by a very small number of fishers. Production is low, even in the communities living along Lake Kivu. Fishing operations are poorly organized, and weakly paid (or unpaid) maritime officials often tolerate corruption as a means of survival.

== Infrastructure ==
=== Roads ===
Road maintenance is managed through provincial government initiatives, which impose taxes on truck drivers to fund maintenance work. These taxes are collected by an organization called PEAGE ROUTE and are used to pay manual laborers working under the supervision of the FEC.

=== Market, transport, and communication ===
Bweremana has a single public market situated on the border between North and South Kivu. Due to overcrowding, several smaller neighborhood markets have emerged. Lake Kivu and the Goma–Bukavu road link communities across the two provinces and facilitate the transport of food to major cities and occasionally to Rwanda. Most traders operate on a small retail scale and rely on the Goma–Bukavu route to obtain manufactured goods. Rural access roads are generally in poor condition, and maintenance often relies on voluntary efforts by local users.

=== Sports and leisure ===
The village has one football field and one basketball court, located near the Bweremana Institute. There are also a few small cinemas, including one operated by Father Wabo, situated close to the main road.
