= Lubero Territory =

Lubero Wilaya ya Lubero (Swahili)
- Territory
- Territoire de Lubero
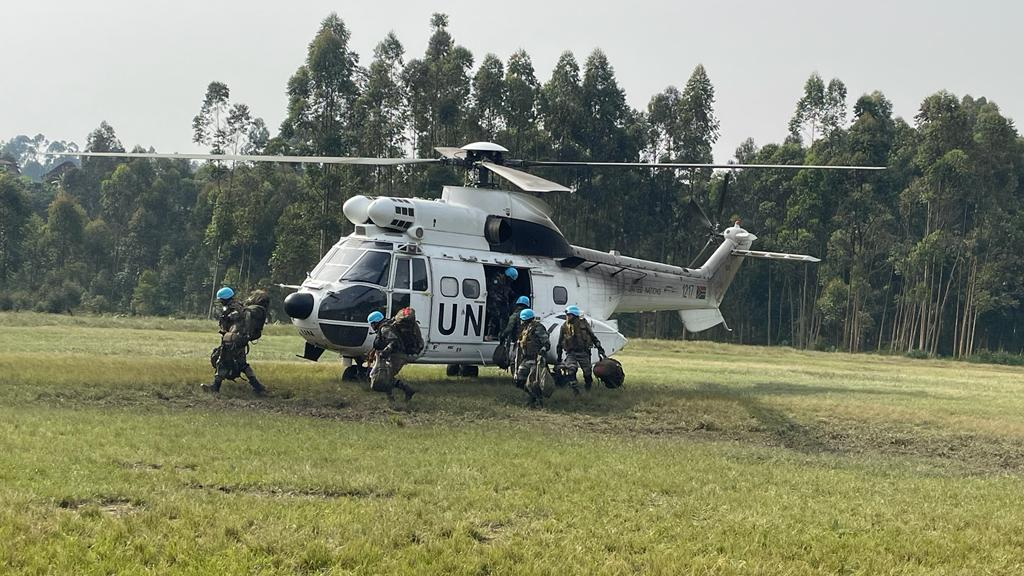
- Lubero on a map of North Kivu Province
- Location in DR Congo
- Coordinates: 0.077°S 28.772°E
- Country: DR Congo
- Province: North Kivu

Area
  - Total: 17,095 km^{2} (6,600 sq mi)

Population (2020)
  - Total: 1,703,102
  - Density: 99.626/km^{2} (258.03/sq mi)
- Time zone: UTC+2 (CAT)

Lubero Territory is a territory in North Kivu, Democratic Republic of the Congo.

== Internally displaced persons ==
On 10 June, 2014, the administrator of Lubero Territory, Joy Bokele, requested assistance for six hundred displaced households who had sought refuge two months prior in the south of the territory. These people come from Walikale where they fled clashes between FDLR militia and Nduma défense of Congo (NDC) Cheka. These internally displaced persons (IDPs) are grouped in several sites, including Kasuho, Bunyantenge and Njiapanda.
