= Timeline of the ADF insurgency (2024) =

Timeline of the ADF insurgency in 2024

This timeline of the Allied Democratic Forces insurgency covers the ADF's militant activity in central and east Africa in 2024.

== Background ==
Following the radicalization of its founding leader, Jamil Mukulu, the ADF was formed as a merger of several rebel groups (initially called ADF/NALU) in 1995. The ADF initially operated in western Uganda but has since, and currently continues to operate solely in the eastern DRC; this includes the North Kivu and Ituri Provinces.

The ADF's leadership shifted after the imprisonment of Mukulu on 30 April 2015. Musa Seka Baluku, Mukulu's second-in-command since the group's formation, stepped forward in his place shortly after. Under Baluku's leadership, the group made contact with the Islamic State (IS) as early as 2017, were formally recognized as a chapter of IS–Central Africa Province (IS-CAP) in 2018, and formally pledged their allegiance to the IS in 2019. By that year, the ADF had split, with one part remaining loyal to Mukulu and the other to Baluku; the latter renewed their allegiance to the IS in April 2022. Since joining IS-CAP, the ADF increasingly targeted civilians into their attacks.

In response to growing causalities at the hands of the ADF, the Congolese and Ugandan armed forces created a joint military force called Operation Shujaa in November 2021. The Operation's already mixed perception, due to views of Uganda's role in the Second Congo War, was further put into question regarding its effectiveness in actually preventing ADF attacks.

== Timeline ==
=== May ===
On 18 May 2024, Operation Shujaa troops captured Commander Anywari Al Iraq, an IED expert from Uganda. In the operation, joint forces seized an SMG, 45 rounds of ammunition, three walkie-talkies, an RPG charger, and various IED materials.

Targeting of Seka Musa Baluku's Madina headquarters by Operation Shujaa forces forced its relocation around May, speculated to be deeper into Mambasa Territory in Ituri Province. Camps led by Commanders Mzee Mayor, Mzee Wa Kazi, and others holding dependents and hostages merged with Madina in May as well. The Madina camp also moved, being reportedly sighted north of Lolwa, Mambasa Territory.

=== June ===
June was the deadliest month of 2024, attributed particularly to Commander Abwakasi's attacks between 3 June and 12 June, during which over 150 civilians were killed. On 3 June, the group crossed the RN44 road to attack Ngwaba village, killing two civilians. The group moved southwest that same day to Masau village, where they killing 18 more civilians. On 5 June, eight civilians from Kabwiki and Keme villages were killed in attacks by the group. Days later, on 7 June, the group attacked Masala and two nearby settlements. In this attack, the group set up roadblocks along main roads connecting the three settlements, posed as Wazalendo forces to gain local trust, before massacring civilians trapped between the roadblocks. 41 bodies were recovered in the aftermath, found between the villages of Masala and neighboring Mahihi and Keme.

=== July ===
On 7 July, Madina camp resupplier, Toyo Adallah, surrendered to Operation Shujaa troops on a resupply trip in Bahaha, Mambasa Territory. Adallah was supposedly facing a death sentence by the ADF for adultery. He was promptly taken to Uganda. (Note: Toyo Adallah was still being held in Uganda as late as of the publishing of the UN Group of Experts' 27 December 2024 report.)

ADF camps led by commanders Tabani, Defender, and Braida merged into one at some point in July.

=== August ===
On 11 August, the ADF attempted a drone-born IED attack on a FARDC position in Malyajama, 30 kilometers from Beni. The device failed to detonate and recovered by security forces.

High-profile commander Braida died by friendly fire on 14 August, alongside one of his two wives. He reportedly died near Biakato, Ituri Province, while he, his group, and other dependents were travelling towards Musa Baluku's Madina camp. His dependents continued to Madina on Baluku's orders. Another high-profile commander, Amigo, died days later, reportedly from a fatal head injury inflicted by an explosive launched by Operation Shujaa forces while escorting a group of Braida's relatives and dependents. One of Braida's wives, which Amigo had abducted years prior, confirmed his death. The two groups would then merge, but were again attacked by Operation Shujaa forces, which scattered the group, allowing some dependents, including several of Braida's wives, to escape.

Abwakasi's group, considered "the most active and deadly ADF cell" by UN officials, was seen operating near Manguredjipa, Lubero Territory in August. Operation Shujaa troops pursued, and the group was slowed by clashes with local militias.

=== September ===
On 28 September, joint Operation Shujaa forces announced having neutralized more than fifty ADF rebels in Beni, Mambasa, and Lubero Territories.

=== October ===
In October, Operation Shujaa's Major General Richard Otto said that business and schools were resuming along the Kasindi border.

=== December ===
The night between 21 and 22 December, between six and 18 civilians were killed in the village of Robinet in the Bapere Sector, with ADF rebels looting and burning down homes. The following day, six civilians were killed by the same rebels in the neighboring village of Kodjo. On 25 December, three bodies were found four kilometers from Makele, likely killed by the same ADF attackers.

Before the last week of 2024, Ugandan Minister of Security, RTD (Note: Return-to-duty: abbreviated RTD.) Major General Jim Muhwezi, assured Ugandan civilians that the government was equipped to deal with any ADF threats. More than 50 people were killed between 22 December and 31 December's festivities, particularly in attacks on villages in the Babika and Baredje groups, Bapere sector and in the Manzia and Mwenye groups in the Baswagha chiefdom. Bapere civil society President, Samuel Kagheni, reported that ADF rebels burned homes in most attacks, contributing to why many residents were forced to move to Manguredjipa and Nziapanda, where FARDC-UPDF joint forces were present. Local sources witnessed ADF fighters splitting into smaller groups to circumvent military positions, come in from the Bandulu region, and return into the Beni Territory.

On 29 December, administrator of the Lubero territory, Colonel Alain Kiwewa, denounced the killings in Robinet and Kodjo nearly a week prior. Between the night of 29 and 30 December, rebels killed seven people in the town of Matombo. The following night, between 30 and 31 December, the same rebels attacked the town of Kekelibo and a different group of ADF rebels, armed with knives and light arms, attacked the village of Kily in the Bulengya group, killing eight civilians, and the village of Mongoya in the Manzya group, killing four civilians. Two ADF rebels were caught by locals, who handed them over to Nziapanda's security services. On 31 December, Chief of Bapakombe Bakondo village, Mwami Atsu Taibo, reported that ADF rebels attacked the FARDC's Mikua position, but were repelled and pursued.

== Analysis ==
Operations Shujaa's relative success was primarily attributed to the killing of numerous high-profile commanders. However, FARDC-UPDF joint forces' attacks pushed ADF militants into areas without security presence, causing many civilian deaths.

=== Total killings and impact ===
An estimated that 1,322 people died due to ADF attacks in 2024. By the start of 2025, 103 victims remained missing. At least 300 security violations and human rights abuses had occurred in 2024. It stated that "the ADF is one of the most active armed groups in eastern DRC" and concluded that:

The ADF remain a real and imminent threat, both locally for the people of Beni, as well as nationally and even internationally. Continuously instrumentalised for economic and ideological reasons, they wage guerrilla warfare and sow terror for material or hidden, immaterial interests. They base their survival on their own isolated informal networks, on the media coverage of their methods of action (repertoires of action), and above all on the Congolese security services' ineffectiveness in ensuring territorial control and internal administrative networking. These armed conflicts perpetrated by the ADF contribute to the creation and/or implantation (conflicts with transversal consequences within society) of other conflicts of a similar nature, i.e. identity-based ones.

=== Experts and human rights groups ===
A UN report released in December 2024 found that Operation Shujaa found "relative" success, with most attacks carried out along the RN4 road. Furthermore, later attacks destroyed strongholds, depleted combatants and leaders, and released hundreds of hostages.

The deaths of ADF commanders Braida and Amiga were confirmed. Braida's 14 August death was confirmed by eight former hostages and his two former wives. The arrest of ADF operatives Yakut Musana and Abdul Rashid Kyoto was provided to the Group in a 1 November communication from the Ugandan government. The Group, however, could not confirm Uganda's claim to have "put out of action" notable ADF rebels including Muraaro Segujja, Feza, Musa Kamusi, Boaz, Rubangakene, Abu Yassin, Bagdad, Fazul, and Mzee Mubindio in the same communication. Furthermore, the government's claim to have killed high-profile ADF Commanders Meddie Nkalubo and Mulalo was disproven as they were found active in ADF activities in 2024; the government confirmed this truth in the same communication.

Intensified attacks on the ADF, however, have forced the group to move to more remote locations and in smaller groups. This movement increased attacks on civilians, revenge killings, kidnapping, looting, and attacks on medical personnel and humanitarian volunteers. The Group concludes that this is caused by Operation Shujaa operations pushing ADF rebels into areas that have no security presence, particularly in Ituri and North Kivu. Technology is becoming increasingly pervasive in ADF arsenals. Detained ADF collaborators, combatants, and former hostages confirmed that drones were used in most camps for surveillance and scouting. (Note: Drones were found in Baluku, Tabani, Braida, Abwakasi, and Defender camps, with Baluku and Braida having at least four each. Eight of these drones were supplied from Kampala routes, with help from ISIL.)

According to the Group, between 1 June and 5 November, 124 ADF attacks resulted in a documented 650 civilian deaths. June was the deadliest month with over 200 deaths reported in Beni, Lubero, and southern Ituri Territories. Attacks in the Cantine locality and Manguredjipa suffered the most attack, causing heavy civilian displacement. Notable ADF factions of Commanders Tabani, Defender, and Braida were the most active, particularly in villages around Mamove, Biakato, and Beu Manyama.

It was believed that the Alliance Fleuve Congo-M23 (AFC-M23) coalition attempted to establish an alliance with the ADF, with talks beginning in February 2024.

=== Military ===
Territorial administrator of Lubero Territory, Colonel Alain Kikewa, said on 3 January 2025 that FARDC forces were instrumental in maintaining control and calm in the core of Lubero but expressed regret over individuals displaced or in distress due to conflict in the region.

=== Independent associations ===
The Taximen en Danger association reported the same day that 31 motorcycle taxi drivers were killed and 48 motorcycles were burned or stolen by both ADF rebels and nonidentifiable attackers throughout 2024. Coordinator Jérôme Malule lamented the deaths and losses of taxi drivers, claimed armed groups use barriers to levy hefty taxes, noted the importance of drivers in the local economy, and called for justice where no public hearing against attackers has been held.

The CRDH reflected on Operation Shujaa on the same day. It noted a relative peace in the Irumu Territory, particularly in the Banyali and Bahema Mitego chiefdoms, underscored the existence of the group's stronghold in the Walese Vonkutu chiefdom, found movements towards Mambasa Territory, and praised the release of several hostages. CRDH coordinator for Ituri, Christophe Muyanderu, found that many operations were, however, "poorly planned," forcing rebels into unsecured areas where populations remained vulnerable, noting the group's movement into the Mambasa Territory.

The Safeguarding Health in Conflict Coalition (SHCC) reported than in 2024, there were "84 incidents of violence against or obstruction of health care," down from 118 in 2023 and 136 in 2022. In 2024, eight heath personnel were killed, nine kidnapped, and many supplies looted. The ADF were one of many rebel groups in the region which contributed to these figures.
