= August 2022 North Kivu massacres =

Killings in Democratic Republic of the Congo

August 2022 North Kivu attacks
- Part of Kivu conflict
- Location: North Kivu, Democratic Republic of the Congo
- Date: August 25-30, 2022
- Deaths: 54+ (per International Crisis Group); 40+ (per local groups); 76 kidnapped
- Perpetrator: ISCAP

Between August 25 and 30, 2022, fighters of the Islamic State – Central Africa Province (ISCAP) attacked six villages in North Kivu, Democratic Republic of the Congo, killing over fifty-four people.

== Background ==
Following the radicalization of its founding leader, Jamil Mukulu, the ADF was formed as a merger of several rebel groups (initially called ADF/NALU) in 1995. The ADF initially operated in western Uganda but has since, and currently continues to operate solely in the eastern DRC; this includes the North Kivu and Ituri Provinces.

The ADF's leadership shifted after the imprisonment of Mukulu on 30 April 2015. Musa Seka Baluku, Mukulu's second-in-command since the group's formation, stepped forward in his place shortly after. Under Baluku's leadership, the group made contact with the Islamic State (IS) as early as 2017, were formally recognized as a chapter of IS–Central Africa Province (IS-CAP) in 2018, and formally pledged their allegiance to the IS in 2019. By that year, the ADF had split, with one part remaining loyal to Mukulu and the other to Baluku; the latter renewed their allegiance to the IS in April 2022. Since joining IS-CAP, the ADF increasingly targeted civilians into their attacks.

In response to growing causalities at the hands of the ADF, the Congolese and Ugandan armed forces created a joint military force called Operation Shujaa in November 2021. The Operation's already mixed perception, due to views of Uganda's role in the Second Congo War, was further put into question regarding its effectiveness in actually preventing ADF attacks.

== Prelude ==
In the summer of 2022, the ADF ramped up attacks in North Kivu, with attacks in Otomabere and Kandoyi killing dozens. with On August 11-12, the ADF freed 800 inmates at a prison in Butembo, killing two policemen in the process.

== Attack ==
Villagers from Nord-Kivu claimed that ISCAP had crossed over from neighboring Ituri province in search of arable land, and attacked six villages in North Kivu around the night of August 25. On August 27, three civilians were killed by ISCAP in a locality of Bashu chiefdom, according to a local chief. At 5 am that same day in Kavasewa, a nearby village, ISCAP attacked a military outpost before assaulting the village, burning down dozens of houses and bludgeoning multiple women to death. On August 29, an ISCAP attack west of Oicha killed two.

Attacks ramped up again on August 30, with ISCAP pillaging the villages of Alima and Laliya. Fourteen villagers were killed in these attacks. The Congolese army also claimed to have secured control over the area after the militants left. On the same day, ISCAP fighters assaulted the hamlet of Beu-Manyama, killing five villagers. International crisis groups, local hospitals, and local human rights groups assessed that the total death toll was over fifty people killed by ISCAP in six days.
