= Masambo massacre =

2022 terror attack in the DRC

- Part of Kivu conflict
- Location: Masambo, North Kivu, Democratic Republic of the Congo
- Date: April 3–4, 2022
- Deaths: 29 killed
- Perpetrator: ISCAP

Between the night of April 3–4, 2022, the Allied Democratic Forces (ADF) attacked the village of Masambo, North Kivu, Democratic Republic of the Congo, killing 29 people.

== Background ==
Following the radicalization of its founding leader, Jamil Mukulu, the ADF was formed as a merger of several rebel groups (initially called ADF/NALU) in 1995. The ADF initially operated in western Uganda but has since, and currently continues to operate solely in the eastern DRC; this includes the North Kivu and Ituri Provinces.

The ADF's leadership shifted after the imprisonment of Mukulu on 30 April 2015. Musa Seka Baluku, Mukulu's second-in-command since the group's formation, stepped forward in his place shortly after. Under Baluku's leadership, the group made contact with the Islamic State (IS) as early as 2017, were formally recognized as a chapter of IS–Central Africa Province (IS-CAP) in 2018, and formally pledged their allegiance to the IS in 2019. By that year, the ADF had split, with one part remaining loyal to Mukulu and the other to Baluku. Since joining IS-CAP, the ADF increasingly targeted civilians into their attacks.

In response to growing causalities at the hands of the ADF, the Congolese and Ugandan armed forces created a joint military force called Operation Shujaa in November 2021. The Operation's already mixed perception, due to views of Uganda's role in the Second Congo War, was further put into question regarding its effectiveness in actually preventing ADF attacks.

In March 2022, two weeks before the Masambo attack, over sixty civilians were killed by ISCAP in four villages in Kivu. The road linking much of the region was a hotbed for violence, with dozens of deadly attacks by insurgents, including ISCAP.

== Attack ==
The attack began on the night of April 3–4, in the village of Masambo. ISCAP militants attacked with knives and firearms, and residents fled the town in the middle of the night, many heading toward Kasindi. While some civilians were killed in their homes, many were shot as they fled. Winye wa Benga, the head of Masambo, initially reported 11 people killed and two kidnapped, but this was later revised to 28 civilians and one soldier killed, following the discovery of more bodies later that week. Three other villages were attacked later that night, but Masambo was the epicenter of the violence.

== Aftermath ==
Initially, the Congolese army stated it would release a statement on the attack after increasing security in the area. Ugandan Major Peter Mugisa, a commander in Operation Shujaa, a joint Ugandan-Congolese offensive against ISCAP that began in November 2021, claimed that after the attack more soldiers were deployed to Masambo and surrounding villages.
