= Timeline of the ADF insurgency (2020) =

Timeline of the ADF insurgency in 2020

This timeline of the Allied Democratic Forces insurgency covers the ADF's militant activity in central and east Africa 2020.

== Background ==
Following the radicalization of its founding leader, Jamil Mukulu, the ADF was formed as a merger of several rebel groups (initially called ADF/NALU) in 1995. The ADF initially operated in western Uganda but has since, and currently continues to operate solely in the eastern DRC; this includes the North Kivu and Ituri Provinces.

The ADF's leadership shifted after the imprisonment of Mukulu on 30 April 2015. Musa Seka Baluku, Mukulu's second-in-command since the group's formation, stepped forward in his place shortly after. Under Baluku's leadership, the group made contact with the Islamic State (IS) as early as 2017, were formally recognized as a chapter of IS–Central Africa Province (IS-CAP) in 2018, and formally pledged their allegiance to the IS in 2019. By that year, the ADF had split, with one part remaining loyal to Mukulu and the other to Baluku. Since joining IS-CAP, the ADF increasingly targeted civilians into their attacks.

== Timeline ==
=== January ===
On 13 January 2020, 30 Congolese soldiers were killed and 70 were wounded in an intense battle at the ADF's headquarters camp "Madina" near Beni. 40 ADF insurgents are reported killed, including five top commanders. The Congolese army nevertheless captured the camp, but failed to apprehend the target of the raid, Baluku. On 28 January, ADF militants hacked 38 civilians to death in Oicha. On the 30th, ADF militants killed 21 civilians in three separate attacks on Oicha, Ache, and Mandumbi.

=== February ===
On 8 February, ADF militants killed eight civilians and abducted 20 others near Beni. The militants retreated after being confronted by police. On 9 February, 60 ADF fighters attack the village of Makeke, DRC, and kill seven civilians. Congolese soldiers and UN peacekeepers pursued the fleeing militants into the woods. After being cornered, 40 ADF fighters surrendered to the Congolese army. On the 17th, an ADF attack in Beni killed at least nine civilians and a Congolese soldier. On the 18th, ADF militants killed 12 civilians and burned down several houses in a village east of Beni. On the 19th, five civilians taken hostage by the ADF were found murdered near Virunga National Park. Between the 24th and 25th, Congolese soldiers and ADF insurgents clashed on two occasions in the Kadohu village in Beni after government forces intercepted an ADF raiding party. Seven ADF fighters and two Congolese soldiers were killed, and one ADF fighter was captured. On the 28th, the Congolese army released a statement that claimed they pushed the ADF out of their last stronghold in Beni Territory.

=== March ===
On 1 March, ADF fighters allegedly killed 24 civilians and twelve others in an attack on a village in Ituri Province. Between 9 and 25 March, various clashes in eastern Congo killed fourteen Congolese soldiers and 62 ADF insurgents. Between the 20th and 24th, heavy fighting outside Beni killed 12 Congolese soldiers and 37 ADF insurgents. Congolese military officers reported that the ADF's influence in North Kivu had been reduced by 80%. On the 30th, the ADF released 38 hostages following a skirmish that left two civilians and one Congolese soldier dead.

=== April ===
On 6 April, an ADF attack on the town of Halungpa, 18 miles from Beni, killed six civilians. On 14 April, a civilian was killed in an ADF attack on Beni. The Congolese army repelled the assault in a skirmish that left two soldiers and five insurgents dead.

=== May ===
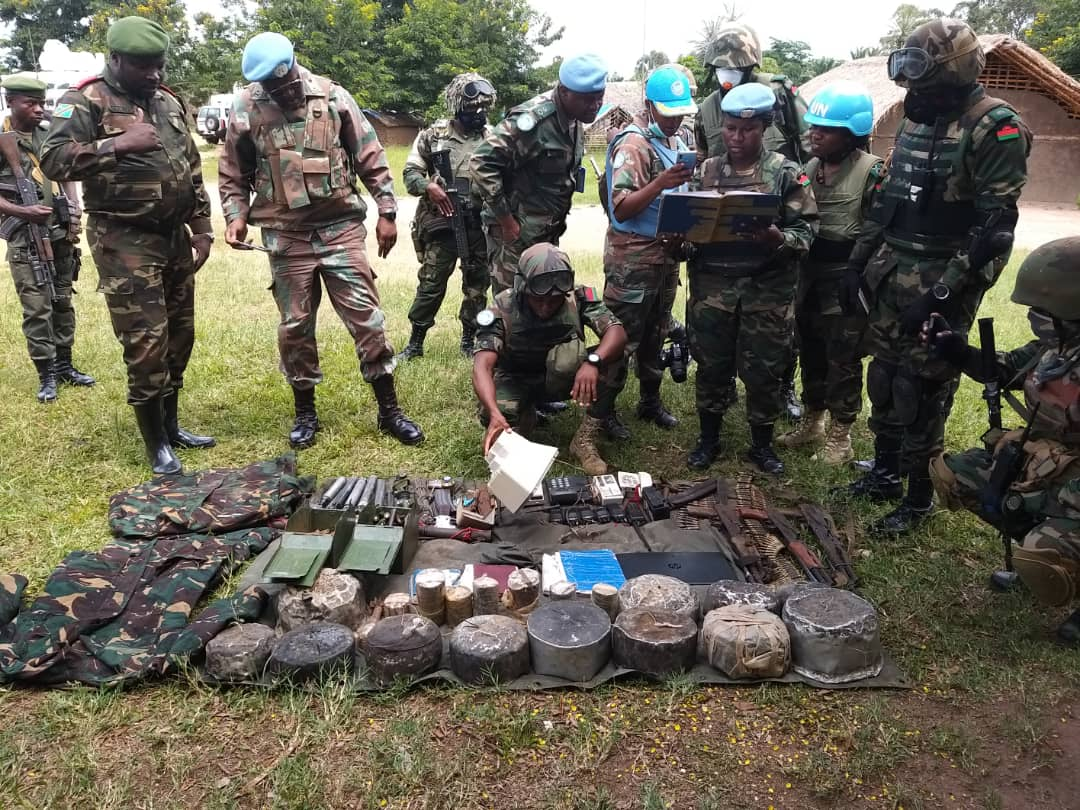
Congolese soldiers and MONUSCO peacekeepers inspecting equipment seized from ADF rebels, May 2020

On 24 May, nine civilians were killed in an ADF attack on Beni. The ADF burned several houses to the ground as well. The army claimed they killed 17 of the attackers. On 25 May, 17 civilians were killed in an ADF on the village of Makutano. On the 26th, at least forty civilians were killed by the ADF at a village in Ituri province. The ADF also looted food and other goods.

=== June ===
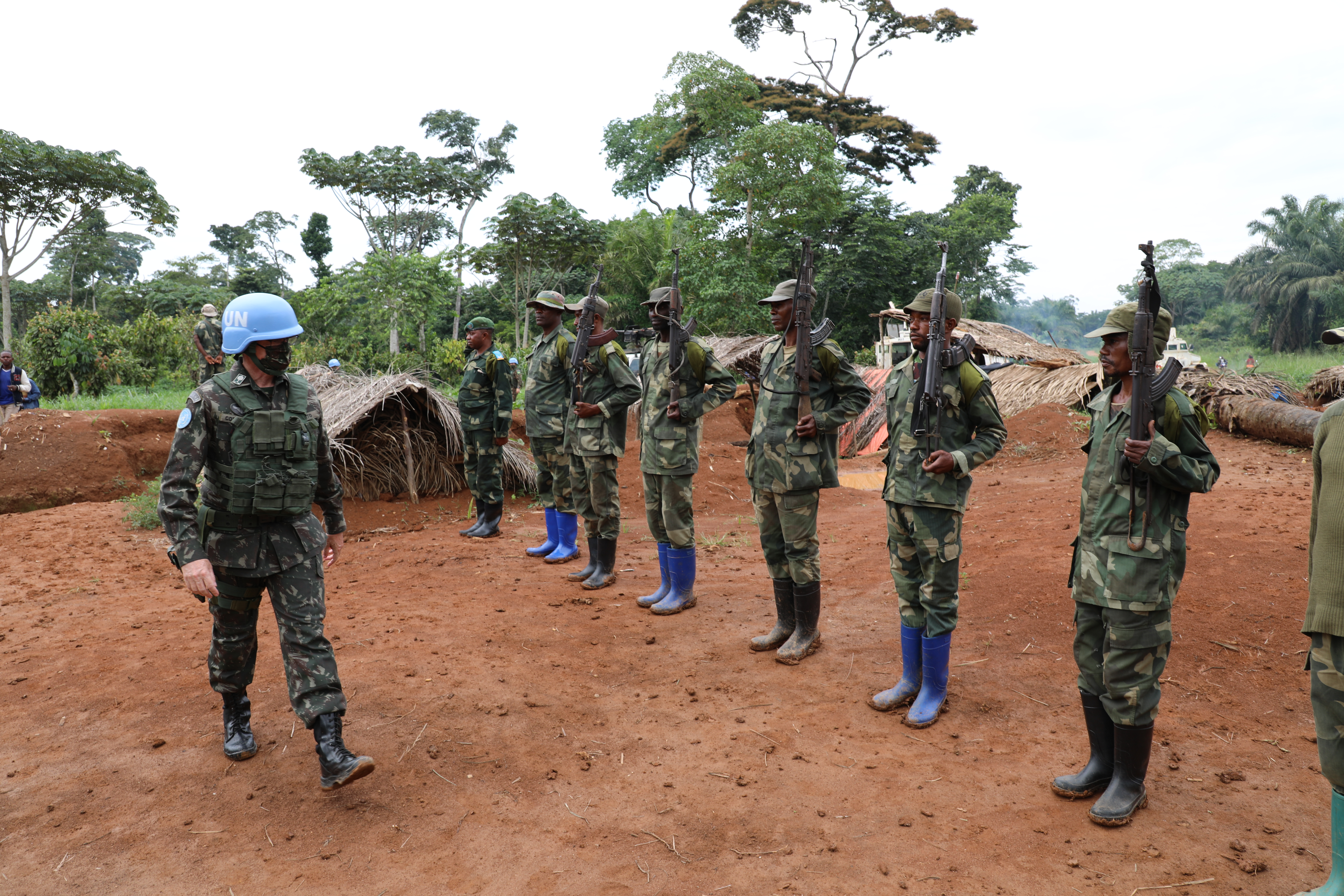
MONUSCO Force Commander, General Ricardo Neves, visits Congolese troops during operations against the ADF, June 2020

On 16 June, six civilians were killed and six went missing in an ADF attack along in North Kivu. More than sixty homes were also burned by the ADF. On 19 June, nine civilians were kidnapped, then killed by the ADF. On the 20th, ten civilians were killed by the ADF in the village of Bukaka, and another ten civilians were killed by the ADF in the village of Biangolo. On the 21st, ten civilians were killed by the ADF in the village of Vukaka. On the 22nd, UN Indonesian peacekeeper was killed and another injured in an attack on their patrol. The attack took place in the town of Makisabo near the city of Beni in the North Kivu province.

=== August ===
On 22 August, the ADF killed thirteen civilians during raids on the villages of Kinziki-Matiba and Wikeno.

=== September ===
On 8 September, ADF militants, fleeing military pressure in Beni, stormed the village of Tshabi, killing 23 people. On 10 September, ADF militants once again attacked Tshabi, killing 35 people, and then destroyed the villages. On the 20th, ADF rebels killed ten civilians in the town of Mbau. On the 25th, eleven bodies were found in the town of Mutuanga after an ADF attack at night.

=== October ===
On 5 October, six were killed by the ADF in Beni. The ADF, together with the Mai-Mai Kyandenga, also attack FARDC troops in the town of Mamove, killing ten civilians. On 20 October, 1,335 prisoners were freed when the ADF attacked Kangbayi central prison and a military camp that provided security to it in Beni. Two inmates were killed in the attack. Between the 28th and 30th, forty people were killed in ADF attacks in the villages of Baeti and Lisasa. People were also kidnapped and churches set on fire. On the 30th, 21 civilians were killed during ADF raids on the villages of Kamwiri, Kitsimba, and Lisasa. Twenty civilians were also abducted and many buildings were set on fire.

=== November ===
On 17 November, 29 bodies were found in Virunga National Park after being killed by the ADF.

=== December ===
On 22 December, four civilians and one soldier were killed in an attack on Bulongo. On 30 December, the ADF captured Loselose village. On the 31st, 25 civilians were massacred by the ADF in the village of Tingwe.
