= 2024 East Congo attacks =

Terrorist incidents in the Democratic Republic of the Congo

- Location: Beni Territory and Mambasa Territory
- Date: February 19, 2024 February 20, 2024
- Deaths: 24
- Perpetrator: Allied Democratic Forces

The 2024 East Congo attacks were terrorist attacks perpetrated by the Allied Democratic Forces (ADF) against civilians in both the North Kivu province and the Ituri province on February 19-20, 2024.

== Background ==
Following the radicalization of its founding leader, Jamil Mukulu, the ADF was formed as a merger of several rebel groups (initially called ADF/NALU) in 1995. The ADF initially operated in western Uganda but has since, and currently continues to operate solely in the eastern DRC; this includes the North Kivu and Ituri Provinces.

The ADF's leadership shifted after the imprisonment of Mukulu on 30 April 2015. Musa Seka Baluku, Mukulu's second-in-command since the group's formation, stepped forward in his place shortly after. Under Baluku's leadership, the group made contact with the Islamic State (IS) as early as 2017, were formally recognized as a chapter of IS–Central Africa Province (IS-CAP) in 2018, and formally pledged their allegiance to the IS in 2019. By that year, the ADF had split, with one part remaining loyal to Mukulu and the other to Baluku; the latter renewed their allegiance to the IS in April 2022. Since joining IS-CAP, the ADF increasingly targeted civilians into their attacks.

In response to growing causalities at the hands of the ADF, the Congolese and Ugandan armed forces created a joint military force called Operation Shujaa in November 2021. The Operation's already mixed perception, due to views of Uganda's role in the Second Congo War, was further put into question regarding its effectiveness in actually preventing ADF attacks.

== Attack ==
On February 20, the Allied Democratic Forces militants stormed a town in Beni territory in North Kivu province using guns and machetes killing 11 civilians. The next day On February 19, rebels associated with the Allied Democratic Forces stormed a town in Mambasa territory, Ituri province killing 13 civilians, most of whom were in their homes. At least a few dozen civilians have been killed in total, though the total number could be higher because there were bodies stolen.
