= Ntoyo massacre =

2025 attack in North Kivu province, DRC

- Part of the Kivu conflict and the ADF insurgency
- Ntoyo (Democratic Republic of the Congo) Location of Ntoyo within the North Kivu Province, Democratic Republic of the Congo
- Native name: Massacre de Ntoyo, Mauaji ya Ntoyo
- Location: 0°21′36.8″N 28°45′24.57″E; Ntoyo, North Kivu, Democratic Republic of the Congo
- Date: 8 September 2025; 9:00 p.m. CAT (UTC+02:00)
- Target: Funeral wake
- Attack type: Mass murder, mass shooting, massacre
- Weapons: Light arms, machetes, hammers
- Deaths: 71 (Note: Per revised death toll reported by authorities following the attack.)–100 civilians: (Note: Per ADF statemet following the attack.): 71+ civilians (Ntoyo); 18 civilians (Beni village)
- Victim: ~2,500 civilians displaced
- Perpetrators: Islamic State; IS-CAP; ADF-Baluku

The Ntoyo massacre (French: Massacre de Ntoyo, Swahili: Mauaji ya Ntoyo) occurred on 8 September 2025, when ISIL-affiliated Allied Democratic Force (ADF-Buluku) rebels attacked a funeral wake in Ntoyo, Bapere sector, Lubero Territory in the North Kivu Province, Democratic Republic of the Congo (DRC). The attack occurred late at night, during which ADF rebels targeted primarily Catholic and Protestant Christians funeral wake. Initial reporting the day of the attack estimated over 60-64 civilian deaths, (Note: The initial death toll varied among sources, including 60, 61, and 64 deaths.) which authorities later revised up to 71 total deaths. An attack in a neighboring town in Beni Territory, in which ADF militants killed 18 more civilians, brought the total up to 89. The attacks were considered some of the most deadly killings in the region in years.

== Background ==
Following the radicalization of its founding leader, Jamil Mukulu, the ADF was formed as a merger of several rebel groups (initially called ADF/NALU) in 1995. The ADF initially operated in western Uganda but has since, and currently continues to operate solely in the eastern DRC; this includes the North Kivu and Ituri Provinces.

The ADF's leadership shifted after the imprisonment of Mukulu on 30 April 2015. Musa Seka Baluku, Mukulu's second-in-command since the group's formation, stepped forward in his place shortly after. Under Baluku's leadership, the group made contact with the Islamic State (IS) as early as 2017, were formally recognized as a chapter of IS–Central Africa Province (IS-CAP) in 2018, and formally pledged their allegiance to the IS in 2019. By that year, the ADF had split, with one part remaining loyal to Mukulu and the other to Baluku; the latter renewed their allegiance to the IS in April 2022. Since joining IS-CAP, the ADF increasingly targeted civilians into their attacks.

In response to growing causalities at the hands of the ADF, the Congolese and Ugandan armed forces created a joint military force called Operation Shujaa in November 2021. The Operation's already mixed perception, due to views of Uganda's role in the Second Congo War, was further put into question regarding its effectiveness in actually preventing ADF attacks. According to BBC Monitoring, 90% of the IS' operations were carried out in Africa by September 2025, of which the ADF committed the second-highest number of civilian killings by a non-state actors globally in 2025, according to Armed Conflict Location and Event Data (ACLED).

=== Motives ===
The motive for the attack is ultimately unclear, but is believed to stem from retaliatory efforts in response to the escalated bombing campaign led by Armed Forces of the Democratic Republic of the Congo (FARDC) and Uganda People's Defense Force (UPDF) troops belonging to Operation Shujaa.

=== Context ===
Ntoyo was home to approximately 2,500 people at the time of the attack. Although no precise record was provided, many civilians were gathered in attendance on a funeral in the town of Ntoyo. Four Congolese soldiers were reportedly stationed in Ntoyo due to previous killings in the region.

== Massacres ==
Between 10 to 70 ADF attackers stormed the funeral wake on the night of 8 September around 9:00 a.m. CAT (UTC+2), catching attendees off guard. Testimonies recounted the militants wearing what seemed like military uniforms and speaking a language which villages could not understand. Additionally, some militants knew the names of residents, which Justin Muhindo Masinda of Missionary Families Without Border said "suggest[ed] they had watched the village beforehand to learn the layout without people realizing." They rounded up civilians and summarily executed them with machetes, hammers, and light arms. After the primary attack, rebels burned down approximately 30 homes and vehicles, which burned some civilians inside them alive. The Aid to the Church in Need (ACN) reported that ADF attackers set buildings alight selectively, corroborating Muhindo's suggestion that the attack was premeditated.

Residents in the periphery of the wake were forced to flee the massacre, hiding in the nearby forest. Stray bullets fired in the course of the killings injured those running for shelter. FARDC spokesperson Lieutenant Marc Elongo stated that the ADF militant perpetrators had fled the scene before the FARDC could intervene.

The day of the attack on Ntoyo, a separate group of ADF troops had conducted an attack in an adjacent town, killing 18. Following both attacks, the ADF claimed responsibility and that they had killed nearly 100 Christians.

== Aftermath and reactions ==
Most of Ntoyo's residents were seen leaving Ntoyo as early as the morning of 9 September, fleeing 7 km away to the nearby mining settlement of Maguredjipa where Operation Shujaa troops were present. Ntoyo was mostly deserted by 10 September. Some bodies of victims were either put in caskets or covered in shrouds in preparation for their burial during heavy rainfall. 25 were subsequently buried on 10 September, with volunteers helping to dig graves.

Residents blamed authorities' inaction for the killings, saying they did not respond to alerts.

=== Military, governments, and intergovernmental organizations ===
France's Foreign Ministry condemned the attack on 11 September 2025, sent condolences, and called for peace in the Great Lakes region.

Humanitarian Coordinator in the DRC for the United Nations (UN) Office for the Coordination of Humanitarian Affairs (OCHA), Bruno Lemarquis, stated in a press release on 10 January that he was "deeply shocked by the brutality of these attacks against civilians," reminded that "civilians are not targets," and urged that protections of civilians under international humanitarian law (IHL) was an "absolute [obligation]."

The African Union's (AU) Chairperson, H.E. Mahmoud Ali Youssouf, published a press release (Note: The African Union's press release was headed as an "Information & Communication Directorate." It was, however, not assigned a formal press release number identifier. It was published from Addis Ababa, Ethiopia, where its headquarters are located.) expressing a "deep shock" upon learning of the attack. He "strongly condemn[ed] this heinous [terrorist] attack, as well as the recurrent violence that continues to target civilians in eastern DRC." Youssouf mentioned that the attack violated IHL and called for the attackers to be found and held accountable "in order to put an end to the prevailing climate of impunity that fuels the recurrence of these atrocities. The text concludes by reaffirming the AU's commitment to "restoring peace, security and stability in the Great Lakes region."
