= Kandoyi and Bandiboli massacres =

2022 terrorist attack

Kandoyi and Bandiboli attacks
- Part of Ituri conflict
- Location: Kandoyi and Bandiboli, Ituri Province, Democratic Republic of the Congo
- Date: August 5–7, 2022
- Deaths: 15-20 total
- Perpetrator: ISCAP (alleged by DRC)

Between August 5 and 7, 2022, suspected Allied Democratic Forces (ADF) militants attacked the villages of Kandoyi and Bandiboli, in Ituri Province, Democratic Republic of the Congo. During the attacks, ADF militiamen burned down houses and attacked residents, killing 10 people in Kandoyi and 5 others in Bandiboli. Fighting between Congolese forces, Mai-Mai, and other rebel groups occurred in the area at the time.

== Background ==
Following the radicalization of its founding leader, Jamil Mukulu, the ADF was formed as a merger of several rebel groups (initially called ADF/NALU) in 1995. The ADF initially operated in western Uganda but has since, and currently continues to operate solely in the eastern DRC; this includes the North Kivu and Ituri Provinces.

The ADF's leadership shifted after the imprisonment of Mukulu on 30 April 2015. Musa Seka Baluku, Mukulu's second-in-command since the group's formation, stepped forward in his place shortly after. Under Baluku's leadership, the group made contact with the Islamic State (IS) as early as 2017, were formally recognized as a chapter of IS–Central Africa Province (IS-CAP) in 2018, and formally pledged their allegiance to the IS in 2019. By that year, the ADF had split, with one part remaining loyal to Mukulu and the other to Baluku; the latter renewed their allegiance to the IS in April 2022. Since joining IS-CAP, the ADF increasingly targeted civilians into their attacks.

In response to growing causalities at the hands of the ADF, the Congolese and Ugandan armed forces created a joint military force called Operation Shujaa in November 2021. The Operation's already mixed perception, due to views of Uganda's role in the Second Congo War, was further put into question regarding its effectiveness in actually preventing ADF attacks.

In recent months, fighting in Ituri province, where Kandoyi and Bandiboli are located, has intensified. ISCAP attacks have killed over 370 civilians since April 2022. Just a day before the Kandoyi and Bandiboli attacks, rebels of the Zaire militia attacked a funeral in the ethnically-Musaba village of Damas, killing 22 people and injuring 16 others.

== Attack timeline ==
On the night of Friday, August 5, alleged ISCAP rebels attacked the village of Kandoyi, killing between nine and ten people in the village, while also burning houses down. One civilian was also killed in Bandiboli. On Saturday morning, rebels attacked Bandiboli, killing five civilians. Fighting between the Congolese army and rebels also began in Bandiboli on Saturday morning. A Congolese army captain was also killed in the clashes, although it is unknown which village.
