= Timeline of the ADF insurgency (2019) =

Timeline of the ADF insurgency in 2019

This timeline of the Allied Democratic Forces insurgency covers the ADF's militant activity in central and east Africa 2019.

== Background ==
Following the radicalization of its founding leader, Jamil Mukulu, the ADF was formed as a merger of several rebel groups (initially called ADF/NALU) in 1995. The ADF initially operated in western Uganda but has since, and currently continues to operate solely in the eastern DRC; this includes the North Kivu and Ituri Provinces.

The ADF's leadership shifted after the imprisonment of Mukulu on 30 April 2015. Musa Seka Baluku, Mukulu's second-in-command since the group's formation, stepped forward in his place shortly after. Under Baluku's leadership, the group made contact with the Islamic State (IS) as early as 2017, were formally recognized as a chapter of IS–Central Africa Province (IS-CAP) in 2018, and formally pledged their allegiance to the IS in 2019. By that year, the ADF had split, with one part remaining loyal to Mukulu and the other to Baluku. Since joining IS-CAP, the ADF increasingly targeted civilians into their attacks.

== Timeline ==
=== January ===
On 7 January 2019, the ADF launched an attack on a market in the village of Mavivi, just north of Beni. Nine civilians (five of them children) were killed. Dozens of homes and farms are looted. On 9 January, ADF insurgents attacked a Congolese army outpost in Beni. Three Congolese soldiers and seven civilians were killed in the resulting gun battle. Two Congolese soldiers were wounded. On the 21st, the ADF attacked Congolese soldiers in the village of Mapou, just outside Oicha. On the 24th, three people were killed and two others were wounded in an ambush, presumably by the ADF, in North Kivu, on a highway that led to Beni.

=== February ===
On 12 February, Congolese soldiers attacked an ADF camp in Mamove, about 50 kilometers outside of Beni. Four insurgents were killed in the resulting firefight, and four hostages were rescued. Congolese soldiers also recovered medicine that had been previously looted by the ADF.

=== March ===
On 8 March, a park ranger was shot dead by unknown assailants in Virunga National Park. Congolese authorities blamed the ADF. On 19 March, ADF fighters disguised as security officers infiltrated and attacked Kalau, a majority-Christian village near Beni. The resulting four-hour assault killed six Christian civilians, including a toddler, and forced nearly five hundred others to flee their homes.

=== April ===
On 2 April, Ugandan authorities reported that the ADF had begun establishing bases in Mozambique's Cabo Delgado Province. On 5 April, American tourist Kimberly Sue Endicott and her native guide were kidnapped by armed gunmen in Queen Elizabeth National Park, near the Uganda-DRC border. They were released two days later, after authorities reached a settlement with the kidnappers. The assailants were not identified, but Uganda and the U.S. strongly suspected the ADF.

=== May ===
On 29 May, alleged ADF fighters launched a massive assault on Congolese army barracks and UN peacekeeping forces in the village of Ngite, near Mavivi. After the militants briefly captured the barracks, a joint UN-Congolese army counterattack inflicted heavy losses, forcing the ADF to withdraw. At least 26 insurgents were killed. One South African UN peacekeeper was wounded. Dozens of weapons, including AK-47s, machetes, grenades, mortars, and PKMs, were recovered. The Islamic State claimed responsibility for the attack.

=== June ===
On 4 June, ADF fighters attacked a village in northeastern Beni, DRC. Thirteen civilians and two Congolese soldiers were killed, and a girl abducted. Congolese soldiers repelled the assault, killing one attacker. Clashes resumed in the area later that day. IS again claimed responsibility. On June 7, officials from Rwanda, Uganda, Tanzania, and the DRC met in Kinshasa to discuss a joint response to the ADF insurgency in North Kivu.

=== July ===
On 22 July, ADF militants attacked the cities of Eringeti and Oicha, killing a total of 12 civilians (nine in Eringeti and three in Oicha). 10 civilians, including children, were abducted. That same day, the ADF clashes with Congolese soldiers in the towns of Mangboko and Masulukwed, resulting in 11 fatalities. ISIL claimed responsibility for the attacks.

=== August ===
On 27 August, a major ADF attack on Boga in Ituri Province resulted in the abduction of 100–200 civilians and the looting of livestock, medicine, and food. Congolese soldiers engaged in combat with the attackers, but no casualties were reported and there were conflicting reports of the effectiveness of the military's response. The attack lasted for about three hours.

=== September ===
On 5 September, Tanzanian soldiers detained a truck full of cows destined for the DRC, alleging the shipment was arranged by ADF supporters to feed insurgents in the Congo. On 14 September, Congolese soldiers repelled a suspected ADF attack on the town of Kitchanga. IS claimed responsibility for the assault.

=== October ===
On 31 October, the Congolese army launched a large scale offensive against the ADF in the Beni Territory, North Kivu. According to spokesman General Leon Richard Kasonga: "the DRC armed forces launched large-scale operations overnight Wednesday to eradicate all domestic and foreign armed groups that plague the east of the country and destabilize the Great Lakes region." The operation was being carried out by the FARDC without foreign support. The focus was primarily on the ADF but other armed groups were also targeted.

=== November ===
On 13 November, Mil Mi-24 helicopters from Ukraine, operated by MONUSCO, conducted airstrikes on an ADF insurgent group attacking an army base near the Semuliki River. The militants retreat into the surrounding woods following the airstrikes. No peacekeepers were reported injured. On the night of November 14–15, ADF insurgents attacked a neighborhood in Beni, looting shops and homes. At least 15 civilians were killed, many by machete. It was believed the ADF carried out the attack in response to the renewed Congolese army offensive. According to Congolese authorities, more than 40 civilians had been killed in such attacks since the offensive began in early November. On the 30th, Congolese soldiers killed high-ranking ADF commander Mouhamed Islam Mukubwa during an assault in North Kivu. Another senior ADF leader, Nasser Abdullayi Kikuku, was also killed earlier in the month.

=== December ===
On 6 December, two ADF attacks in the villages of Mantumbi and Kolokoko killed 17 civilians. On 10 December, the U.S. imposed sanctions on ADF leader Musa Baluku, and five other Congolese Islamist rebels.
