= Timeline of the ADF insurgency (2013) =

Timeline of the ADF insurgency in 2013

This timeline of the Allied Democratic Forces insurgency covers the ADF's militant activity in central and east Africa 2013.

== Background ==
Following the radicalization of its founding leader, Jamil Mukulu, the ADF was formed as a merger of several rebel groups (initially called ADF/NALU) in 1995. The ADF initially operated in western Uganda but has since, and currently continues to operate solely in the eastern DRC; this includes the North Kivu and Ituri Provinces.

== Timeline ==
=== January ===
On 24 January 2013, insurgents tortured and later executed thirteen people abducted from the city of Oicha, North Kivu.

=== April ===
In April, it was reported that ADF started a recruitment campaign in Kampala and other parts of the country. Citing a defector from ADF, "allAfrica" reported that some ten new recruits joined ADF forces every day.

=== July ===
In July, the ADF renewed its fighting in the Congolese district of Beni. The ADF, together with the NALU, fought a pitched battle with the FARD, briefly taking the towns of Mamundioma and Totolito. On 11 July, the ADF attacked the town of Kamango, triggering the flight of over 60,000 refugees across the border into the Ugandan district of Bundibugyo.

=== September ===
Early in September, regional leaders under the International Conference of the Great Lakes Region (ICGLR) asked the recently formed combative Intervention Brigade under MONUSCO to attack positions of foreign forces operating in DRC, including the ADF. On 23 September, three people were killed during an ADF attack in the Watalinga Sector, North Kivu, DRC. On the 27th, ADF militants killed five and abducted 30 people in an attack on a health center in the village of Maleki, DRC.

=== October ===
On 23 October, ADF guerrillas abducted 26 people from the village of Upira, North Kivu, later transferring them to the rebel strongholds of Makembi and Chuchubo.

=== December ===
On 14 December, thirteen people were killed, in the aftermath of an ADF attack on the Musuku village, Uganda. On 15 December, ADF killed eight people in the Biangolo village, Uganda. On the 25th, ADF rebels attacked the city of Kamango, DRC. Over fifty civilians were killed and many buildings were burnt down. The city was retaken by the Congolese army the following day. On the 29th, ADF launched another attack on the city of Kamango. The ADF militants beheaded 21 civilians and urged the residents of the city to flee to Uganda.
