= Mwalika valley =

Mwalika
- Location within Democratic Republic of the Congo
- Floor elevation: 700 m (2,300 ft)

Geography
- Location: Democratic Republic of the Congo
- Coordinates: 0°14′33″N 29°35′32″E
- Interactive map of Mwalika

Mwalika is a valley located around the Semliki River in the northern part of Virunga National Park in the Democratic Republic of the Congo.

== History ==
Since the early 2000s the valley had served as a camp of the Allied Democratic Forces (ADF) rebel group. Since at least 2009 it has been used as a training camp for new recruits coming from Uganda and other countries before being transferred to Madina. It also was sued for growing food for the group. The camp was regularly moved, including twice in 2012 and once in 2014. In early 2020 parts of the valley were overrun by FARDC, but insurgents later returned there.

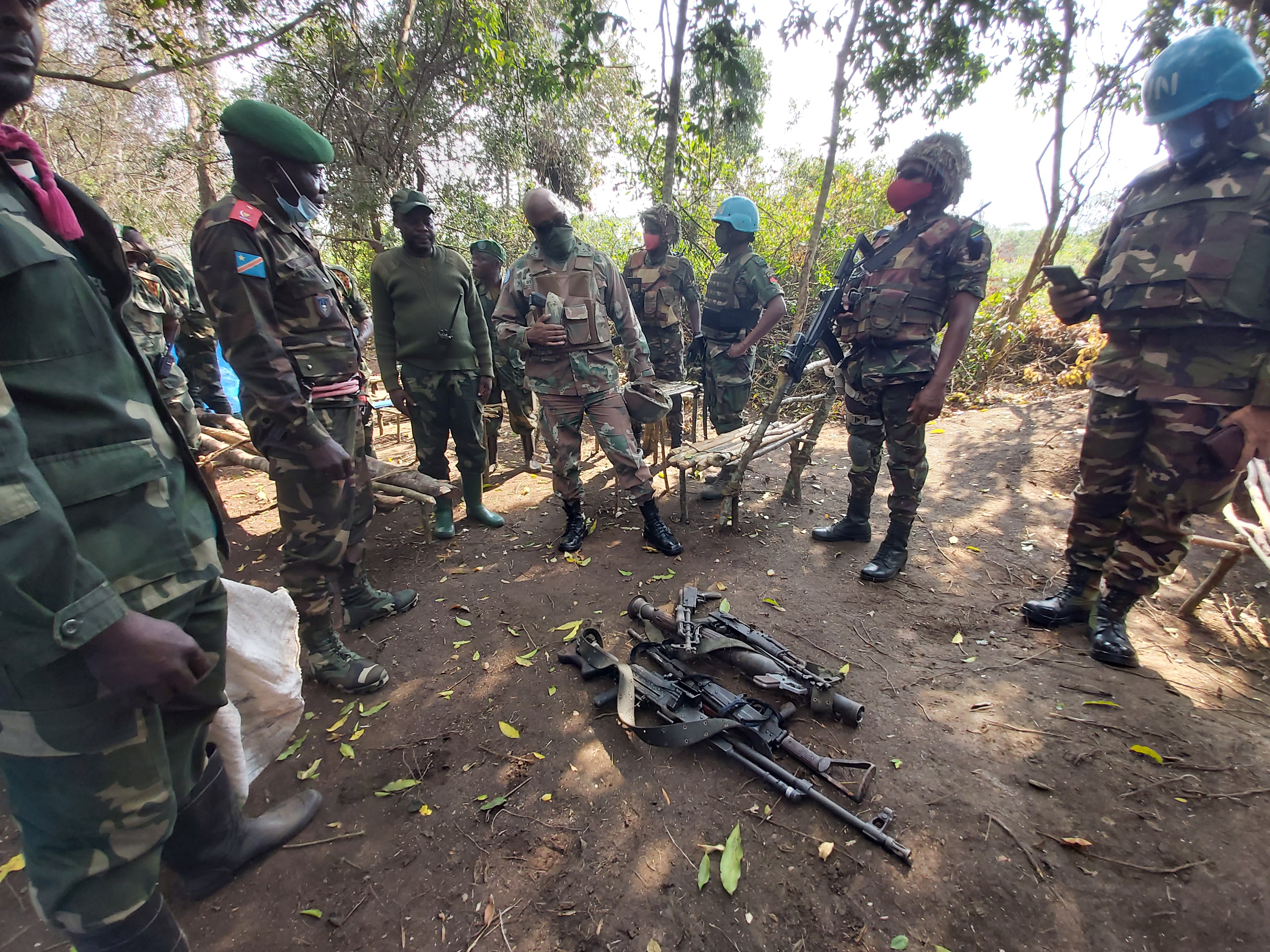
Senior officers of MONUSCO and FARDC Forces visit Mwalika valley on August 31, 2021

In July 2023 during the Operation Shujaa Ugandan forces rescued 14 women from the valley who were in the ADF captivity. On 25 August ADF commander Fazul was reportedly killed there. By the end of the year, the rebels had reportedly been dislodged from the Mwalika valley.
