= Richard Otto =

Richard Otto may refer to:

- Richard Otto (physician) (1872–1952), German physician and bacteriologist
- Richard Otto (military officer) (active from 1986), Ugandan general

== See also ==
- Richard Otto Maack (1825–1886), Russian naturalist, geographer, and anthropologist
- Richard Otto Zöpffel (1843–1891), Baltic German church historian and theologian
