= 2021 Uganda bombings =

October 2021 terrorist attacks in Uganda

- Part of the Allied Democratic Forces insurgency
- Location: Kampala (first and fourth attacks); Mpigi District (second attack); Nakaseke District (third attack)
- Date: 23 October; 25 October; 29 October; 16 November
- Target: Civilians, security forces
- Attack type: Bombings, suicide bombings
- Weapons: IED, Explosive belt
- Deaths: 11 (including four perpetrators)
- Injuries: 39
- Perpetrators: Allied Democratic Forces; Islamic State – Central Africa Province; Al-Shabaab
- Motive: Islamic extremism

From late October to mid November 2021, the Islamic State organization carried out four bombing attacks across Uganda.

== Background ==
The Allied Democratic Forces (ADF) is an Islamist group originated in Uganda but is based in the nearby Democratic Republic of the Congo. The group's insurgency began in 1996; it kills hundreds of civilians every year, mainly by attacking villages. The most deadly ADF attack in Uganda was on 8 June 1998, when the group attacked the Uganda Technical College, Kichwamba in Kabarole District, killing 80 students and abducting about 100. In 1997, another major attack was carried out, when the group threw bombs into taxis and public buildings, killing more than 50 people and wounding about 160 others.

On 11 July 2010, suicide bombings were carried out against crowds watching a screening of 2010 FIFA World Cup Final match during the World Cup at two locations in Kampala. The attacks killed 74 people and wounded 70 more. Al-Shabaab, a jihadist Somali terrorist group, claimed responsibility for the attacks as retaliation for Ugandan support for AMISOM.

== Attacks in 2021 ==
After 11 years of relative calm, the ADF targeted Uganda in 2021 with the help of Islamic State-linked terrorists.

On 1 June, General Katumba Wamala was travelling in a vehicle when four gunmen appeared and opened fire, wounding Wamala and killing his driver and his daughter. A month later, the authorities revealed that the attackers were Islamists who were trained in a jihadist camp in North Kivu, Congo, and had links with the ADF and the Islamic State.

On 27 August, the authorities arrested an ADF member for planning a suicide bombing attack at the funeral of a police commander, who was a major figure in the arrest of group's members. Between July and August, at least 25 civilians were killed in Lwengo and Masaka. The victims were killed in their houses and in the streets by knifemen during the night. While the motive behind the killings and the identities of the perpetrators is not confirmed so far, authorities suspected that ADF terrorists were behind the murders.

=== October ===
On 8 October, Islamic State militants bombed a police post in Kawempe. Nobody was injured in the attack. It was the first time that the Islamic State claimed responsibility for an attack in Uganda.

On 14 October, the United Kingdom issued a warning of an imminent terrorist attack, calling on their nationals to be extremely vigilant about their security "especially in crowded and public places like hotels, transport hubs, restaurants and bars, and during major gatherings like sporting or religious events." The Uganda Police Force issued a statement urging the public to keep calm as they "continue to review our security posture across the country which continues to be maintained as normal." The attacks are believed to be a retaliation for the recent round-up by the Ugandan police against persons believed to have links with Islamic State – Central Africa Province (IS-CAP). Uganda has also openly offered to help Congo fight the group and has maintained that all that is required is greenlight from Kinshasa to deploy to Beni.

At 9 p.m. on 23 October, a bomb exploded in a bar in Komamboga, a suburb in Kawempe North, Kampala, killing a waitress and injuring three other people. Three men, pretending to be customers, brought the bomb into the restaurant in a polythene bag and left it under a table, leaving before it exploded. On 24 October, the Islamic State claimed responsibility, saying they targeted the establishment because it is frequented by government employees.

At 5 p.m. on 25 October, a suicide bomber blew himself up on a bus in Lungala, Mpigi District, carrying 52 passengers. Three people were wounded in the attack. The bus was travelling between Masaka and Kampala. The attacker was the only one who died in the incident. A day later, authorities identified him as a member of the ADF.

On 29 October, two children were killed during a bomb explosion at a village in Nakaseke District. The device looked like an exotic "jackfruit" and was given to the children while they were playing. The victims were a 14-year-old and a disabled child.

=== November ===
On 16 November, at around 10:03 a.m., three suicide bombers attacked two targets in Kampala within three minutes of each other. The first bomber blew himself up at checkpoint of the Central Police Station (CPS) just opposite Kooki Towers building along Buganda Road, killing two people and injuring several others, including police officers at the entrance of the police station. The explosion shattered glass windows on the CPS building and the Kooki Tower building. Two other bombers then exploded at Jubilee House along Parliamentary Avenue about 100 meters from the entrance of the Parliament, killing two more people and injuring many others. The people killed were three civilians and one policeman. Thirty-three more were injured, including five in critical conditions. More bombs have been found in other parts of the city. The Islamic State claimed responsibility for the attacks. Security forces killed seven suspects and arrested 106 more in connection to the attack days later.

== See also ==
- 2010 Kampala bombings
- Assassination attempt on Katumba Wamala
