= Dick Olum =

Ugandan general (born 1970)

Major General Dick Olum
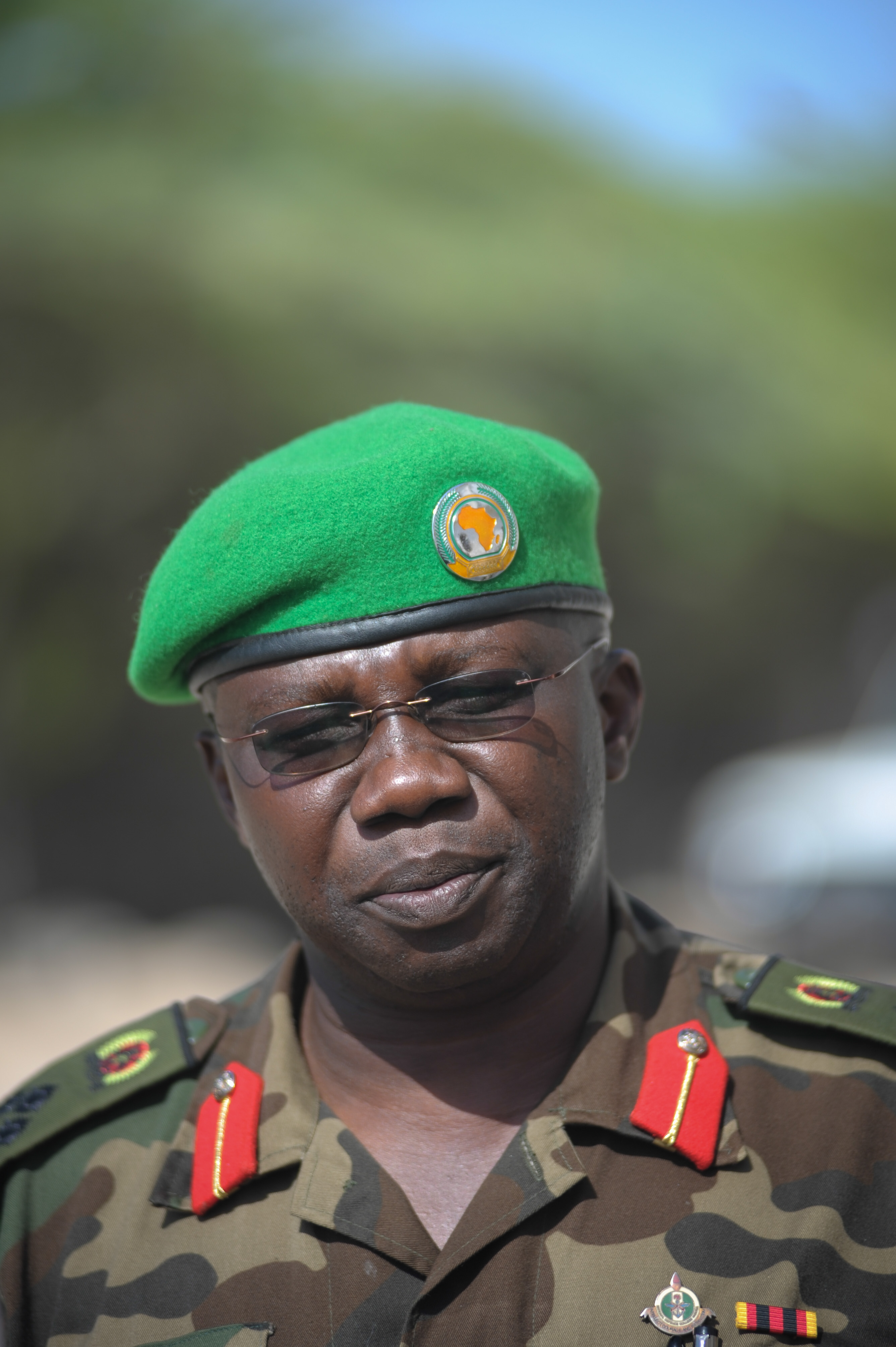
- Born: Richard Prit Olum; 1970 (age 55–56); Zombo, Uganda
- Military career
- Allegiance: Uganda
- Branch: Ugandan Land Forces
- Service years: 1990–present
- Rank: Major general

Major General Richard Prit Olum, commonly known as Dick Olum, is a military officer in the Uganda People's Defence Force (UPDF). Effective 13 May 2024, he serves as commander of the "South Sudan Stabilization Mechanism", an observer force to ensure adherence to the peace agreements. Before that, he served as the Ugandan commander of the UPDF forces in the Democratic Republic of the Congo under the joint Uganda/DRC mission code named Operation Shujaa. He simultaneously served as the commander of the UPDF Mountain Division, based in Fort Portal, Kabarole District at the base of the Rwenzori Mountains. His appointment was made on 12 October 2022.

Before that, from October 2017 until October 2022, he was Uganda's military attaché at the Ugandan embassy in the Democratic Republic of the Congo, based in Kinshasa.

Immediately prior to that assignment, from April 2015 until October 2017, he was the commanding officer of the third army division of the UPDF, based in Moroto. Before that, he served as the commander of the UPDF contingent in Somalia as part of the African Union Mission to Somalia (AMISOM). He was appointed to that position in June 2013. He took his position in Mogadishu Somalia, in September 2013. His mission to Somalia ended in November 2014 when he was replaced by Sam Kavuma.

== Background ==
Olum was born in Zombo District, West Nile sub-region, Northern Region of Uganda in 1970.

== Military career ==
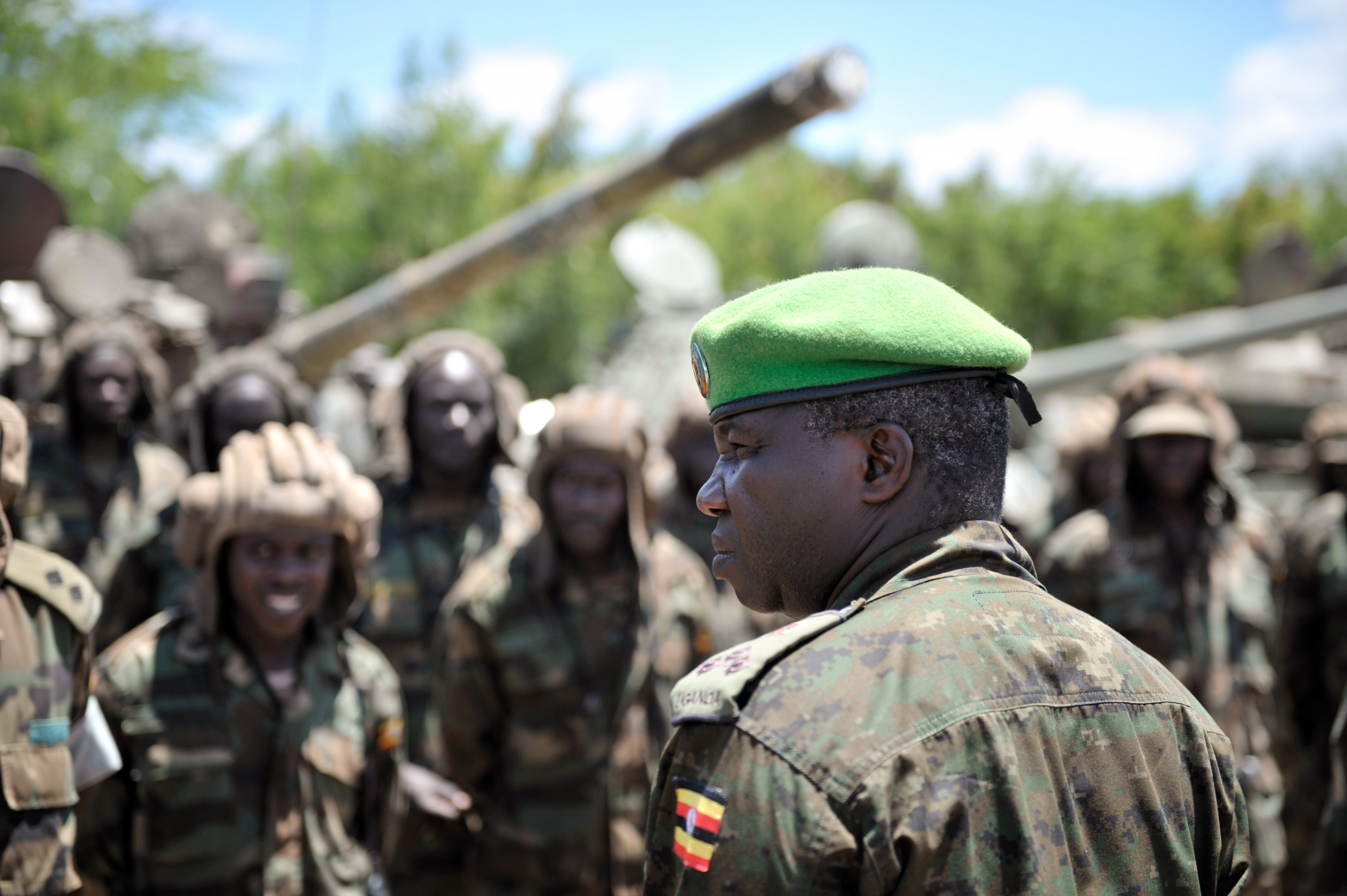
Olum addresses UPDF soldiers during Operation Indian Ocean (2014).

In 2006, when the Uganda Junior Staff College, based in Jinja, was founded, Lieutenant Colonel Olum was selected to be its commandant. In 2010, at the rank of colonel, he was transferred to the Uganda Military Academy in Kabamba as chief instructor. In 2012, the African Union (AU) established a 5,000-strong military force, based in Nzara, South Sudan, with the objective of hunting down fugitive warlord Joseph Kony. The force was composed of troops from the African countries affected by the Lord's Resistance Army insurgency, namely Uganda, South Sudan, the Democratic Republic of the Congo, and the Central African Republic. Colonel Olum was selected as the first commander of the AU force against Kony. In June 2013, he was assigned to lead the UPDF contingent to AMISOM and was appointed acting brigadier. He assumed his post in Somalia in September 2013. In November 2013, Olum was promoted to full brigadier in the UPDF. In April 2015, he was appointed commanding officer of the UPDF third division, based in Moroto.

As commander of the UPDF Mountain Division and as commander of Operation Shuja, General Olum replaced Lieutenant General Kayanja Muhanga who was promoted to Commander of the UPDF Land Forces, based in Bombo, Uganda.

== Family ==
Olum is a married father of two children.
