= Richard Otto (military officer) =

Ugandan general

Richard Otto Major General
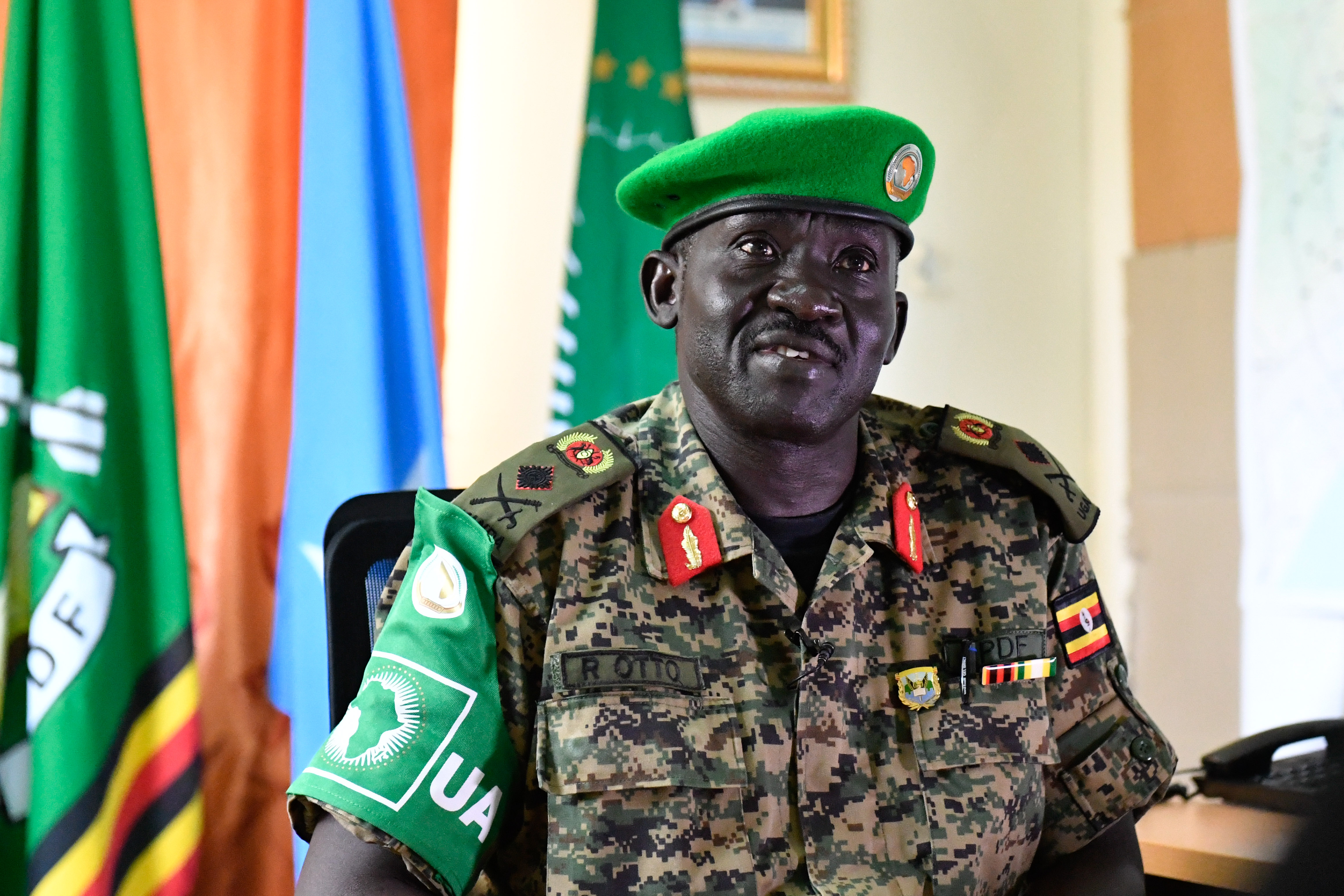
- Born: January 1, 1968 (age 58); Uganda
- Military career
- Allegiance: Uganda
- Branch: UPDF Land Forces
- Service years: 1986 – Present
- Rank: Major General
- Commands: *Chief of Defence Intelligence and Security; Commanding Officer of UPDF Mountain Division; *Commander of Operation Shujaa; *Commanding Officer UPDF Third Division; *Commander of UPDF AMISOM Contingent; *Commanding Officer UPDF Contingent in Central African Republic

Major General Richard Otto is a senior military officer in the Uganda People's Defence Forces (UPDF). Since 16 April 2025, he was appointed Chief of Defence Intelligence and Security from commander of the UPDF Mountain Division and also Commander of "Operation Shujaa", a joint undertaking by the UPDF and the Armed Forces of the Democratic Republic of the Congo (FARDC) to neutralize the Allied Democratic Front (ADF) terrorist organization in the Eastern DR Congo. Prior to his UPDF mountain division assignment, Richard Otto was the chairman of the "South Sudan Peace Mechanism", an IGAD-sponsored observer mechanism, to ensure adherence to the peace treaties by the protagonists.

Before that, he was the commanding officer of the third army division of the UPDF, based in Moroto. He was appointed to that position in May 2017.

Prior to that, he served as the commander of the UPDF contingent in the Central African Republic, as part of the African Union Regional Task Force (AU-RTF), the regional counter-offensive against the Lord's Resistance Army (LRA).

== Background ==
He was born in the Northern Region of Uganda in the 1960s.

== Career ==
The regional task force to neutralise (kill or capture) the Ugandan fugitive Joseph Kony was established in 2012. The force was supposed to be 5,000 troops strong, with units from the African countries terrorized by Kony and his guerilla force, the LRA. Major General Dick Olum, at the rank of colonel, was selected as the first commander of the force.

However, the force turned out to be composed entirely of Ugandan soldiers. The other countries, South Sudan, Democratic Republic of the Congo and Central African Republic, beset by domestic instability and in some cases outright civil war, were unable to send troops or quickly withdrew the ones assigned to the mission. The mission failed to secure donor funding and Uganda ended up funding the entire mission on its own.

Later, Richard Otto, at the rank of colonel took command of the anti-LRA troops. They were joined by a 100-strong contingent from the United States military in non-combat roles. In April 2017, the mission was closed and the Ugandan and American troops relocated to other missions.

Richard Otto, at the rank of brigadier, also served as commander of the 6,000 military personnel comprising the UPDF AMISOM contingent in Somalia. He replaced Brigadier Michael Kabango, whose tour of duty had come to an end.

In October 2017, the president of Uganda and commander-in-chief sent Richard Otto, now at the rank of Brigadier to replace Dick Prit Olum as the head of the UPDF third division, in Moroto. Olum was dispatched to Kinshasa, as Uganda's Defence Attache to DR Congo.

In May 2024, Richard Otto now at the rank of major general, replaced Major General Dick Olum, as commander of the UPDF Mountain Division. Dick Olum was selected to lead the "South Sudanese Stabilization Mission".

== See also ==
- List of military schools in Uganda
