= Madina, Democratic Republic of the Congo =

Mobile ADF headquarters in the Democratic Republic of the Congo

Madina is the name used to refer to mobile headquarters of the Allied Democratic Forces in the Democratic Republic of the Congo which at various points in time has been located either in the North Kivu or Ituri territories.

== History ==
=== Madina I (2008–2014) ===
0.758333°N 29.7°E
The camp was first established in 2008 and called "Nadui" before being renamed to Madina. In June 2010 it was overran by Congolese army, but insurgents regained it in 2011 after the army pulled out.

The camp used to house between 500 and 700 people including ADF leader Jamil Mukulu. Inside the compound, soldiers found S8 rockets and anti-tank mines. The base included a mosque, air raid bunkers, several gardens, a cemetery, men's and women's prison and a school. It was overran by the DR Congo army during the Operation Sukula I in March 2014.

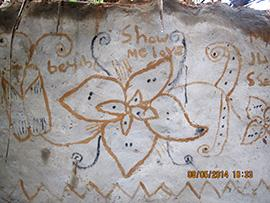
Artwork was found inside and outside many structures at the Madina camp. This photo includes the words “Show me love”

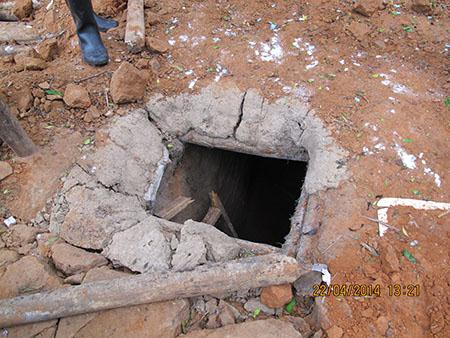
View of the entrance to the underground “men’s prison” at Madina camp

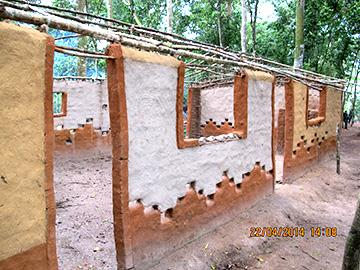
Building identified as a mosque by FARDC, at Madina camp

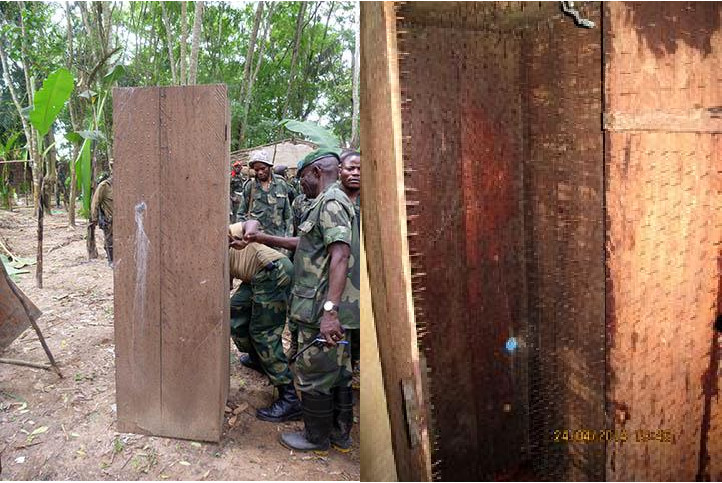
Congolese soldiers inspecting an "Iron Maiden" torture device following the capture of ADF headquarters at the Madina camp

=== Madina II (2015–2020) ===
The second camp was set up by Musa Baluku early in 2015, after escaping the first Madina camp, south of Kainama. Congolese army overran it temporarily on the 13th of May, and then again on 15/6 September 2016. Baluku's group returned there in October 2016 following the army's withdrawal. The base consisted of three camps, Whisper, Headquarters, and Bayt al-Mal including underground bunkers for protection against air attacks, housing between 200 and 300 people including women and children.

=== Madina III (2016–2020) ===
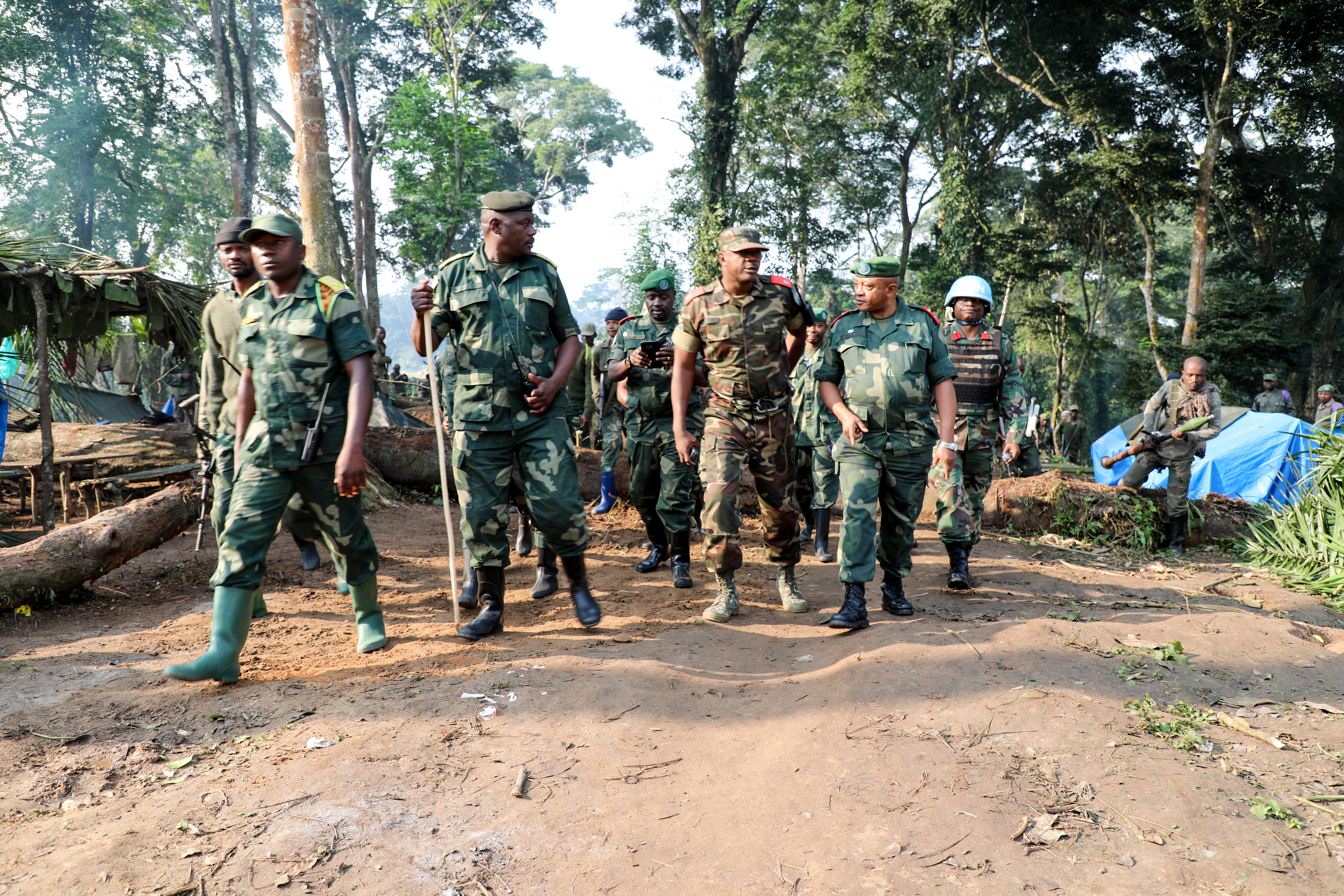
A joint FARDC-MONUSCO mission at Madina, January 2020

0.7916554°N 29.66421°E
In 2019 the Madina base was divided into Madina 3.1 and 3.2, Madina 3.2 reportedly consisted of four camps, Kajaju, Bango, Whisper and Richard each housing between 150 and 200 ADF combattants. The camp was used to train child soldiers.

On 13 January 2020, the Congolese army raided the Madina camp. 30 Congolese soldiers were killed and 70 were wounded in the intense battle with the ADF. 40 ADF insurgents were also reported killed, including five top commanders. The Congolese army nevertheless captured the camp, but failed to apprehend the target of the raid, ADF leader Musa Baluku.

=== Madina IV (2020–2021) ===
0.82008554°N 29.82782759°E
Also known as Kambi ya Yua, the camp existed between 2020 and 24 December 2021, when it was overran by the Ugandan army. Jihadis fled the area before the arrival of Ugandan army, with soldiers only managing to captured a laptop, propaganda papers, three solar panels and some ammunition there.

=== Madina V (2021–2023) ===
0.8914445°N 29.642808°E
The Madina V camp as of 2021 reportedly housed around 200 people and was divided into four subcamps: Kajaju, Whisper, Bango and “HQ” on the border of Beni and Irumu territories between Bango and Lese. The life at the base was reprotedly extremely harsh with inhabitants forced to loot food for survival.

=== Madina VI (2023-2024) ===
1.16113°N 29.37892°E
At the end of 2023 Baluku again relocated the camp to the Ituri territory between RN44 and RN4, to the west of RN4 and the Ituri river. Near the camp a landing strip was reportedly located though it was unclear if it was used.

=== Madina VII (2024–2025) ===
1.415590162°N 29.4944285756°E
In early 2024 in responde to the increased pressure from the Operation Shujaa, the Baluku's group decided to move the camp further north. In July 2024 the camp reportedly housed more than 1,000 people including 200 fighters. By the end of August-early September 2024, Baluku's camp was reported some 30 km north of Lolwa

=== Madina VIII “Centrale” (2025-2026) ===
1.59993487°N 29.23937238°E
On 10 July 2025, Ugandan forces reportedly took control of the camp forcing the group to relocate further west in an area referred to as “Centrale,” situated between the Epulu and Ituri rivers, in an area of the Ituri Rainforest which hosts the Okapi Wildlife Reserve.

=== Madina IX (2026-) ===
On 23 February 2026 Ugandan forces seized the Madina VIII camp. While important materiel was recovered, including over 200 kg of explosive materials, over 100 improvised explosive devices and several AK-type assault rifles, the operations failed to neutralize senior ADF leaders. ADF subsequently relocated further north. As of March 2026 the HQ is reported to be located around the Epulu river.

== Interactive map ==
ADF camps in North Kivu and Ituri (click on the map to see detailed descriptions)
