= Kayanja Muhanga =

Ugandan army officer (born 1965)

Lieutenant General Kayanja Muhanga
- Muhanga in 2022
- Born: 1965 (age 60–61); Uganda
- Citizenship: Uganda
- Occupation: Military officer
- Years active: 1985–present
- Relatives: Andrew Mwenda, Margaret Muhanga, Baguma Muhanga

Lieutenant General Kayanja Muhanga (born 1965) is a Ugandan army officer, who currently serves as Commander of Land Forces in UPDF. He was appointed to that position in October 2022 by the President of Uganda and Commander in chief of the UPDF, Yoweri Museveni. He previously served as commander of the Uganda People's Defence Force contingent in Eastern DRC under Operation Shujaa. He was appointed to that position in January 2021 by Yoweri Museveni, the Commander in Chief of the UPDF and the President of Uganda. Prior to that, Maj. General Muhanga served as the commandant of the military police within the UPDF.

== History ==
Kayanja Muhanga was born in Fort Portal, Kabarole District, Western Uganda, circa 1964. He is an older brother to journalist Andrew Mwenda, the publisher and editor of the Ugandan newsmagazine The Independent. He also has a sister, Margaret Muhanga, a politician. His father is Mzee Phillip Muhanga of Fort Portal.

== Formal education ==
Muhanga attended Eden Secondary School in Hoima district, and later Mpanga Day School in Fort Portal.

In 1985, while still in S5, he joined Museveni's National Resistance Army (NRA).

== Military education ==
Muhanga attended the Cadet Officers Course at the Uganda Military Academy in 1988. At that time, the school was located at Quaddafi Barracks in Jinja, Eastern Uganda, before it was relocated to Kabamba, in Mubende District.

== Military career ==
He joined the NRA at the rank of private, serving in that position until NRA captured power in 1986. He served in the military police unit based in Kasese. He served in the Presidential Protection Unit at the rank of private from 1986 until 1988. Following the Junior Cadet Officer Course, he served in the office of the Chief of Combat Operations, at the rank of second lieutenant. He was transferred to the Directorate of Military Intelligence in 1990, serving there until 1993. From 1993 until 1997, he served as the intelligence officer, attached to the UPDF barracks in Mubende. He was assigned to the Joint Anti-Terrorism Taskforce, at the rank of captain. He was promoted through major, lieutenant colonel and colonel, and was posted to Mogadishu, Somalia, as part of the UPDF contingent to AMISOM. While there, he commanded Uganda’s "Battle Group Eight" and concurrently served as the deputy commander for the Ugandan contingent in Somalia.

After his tour of duty, he served as the chief of the Military Police in the UPDF, until January 2014. In January 2014, Colonel Kayanja Muhanga was appointed Commander of the UPDF Operations in South Sudan. In February 2014, he was promoted to the rank of brigadier.
