= Operation Shujaa =

Ongoing military offensive in the Congo that began in 2021

- Part of the Allied Democratic Forces insurgency and war against the Islamic State
Date	30 November 2021–present
Location	Eastern Congo (mainly Kivu and Ituri)

Belligerents
Uganda; DR Congo (United Nations) MONUSCO	Islamic State; Allied Democratic Forces (partially aligned with IS) FPIC; CODECO

Commanders and leaders
(Uganda) Muhoozi Kainerugaba (Uganda) Kayanja Muhanga (Uganda) Dick Olum (Uganda) Richard Otto (Democratic Republic of the Congo) Bombele Lohola Camille (Democratic Republic of the Congo) Kayanja Muhanga	(Islamic State) Musa Baluku (Islamic State) Bongela Chuma (Islamic State) Meddie Nkalubo (allegedly killed) (Islamic State) Elias Segujja (allegedly killed); Hassan Nyanzi (surrendered) "Muzaaya"; Benjamin Kisokeranio (POW)

Units involved
Uganda People's Defence Force (UPDF): Mountain Division; Armed Forces of the Democratic Republic of the Congo (FARDC); Some Mai-Mai militias	Islamic State's Central Africa Province: ADF-Baluku; ADF-Mukulu / PULI (until Jan. 2023)

Strength
Thousands	Thousands (Ugandan claim)

Casualties and losses
Unknown	Heavy

Operation Shujaa (loosely translated "operation of the brave") is an ongoing military offensive conducted by the Democratic Republic of the Congo and Uganda against insurgent forces in Kivu and Ituri, mainly Islamic State (IS) affiliates and the Allied Democratic Forces (ADF). Launched in November 2021, it has resulted in significant losses for the targeted rebel forces and substantially reduced their activity. At times, the government forces engaged in Operation Shujaa have also fought non-ADF/IS rebel groups.

== Background ==
The Allied Democratic Forces were founded in 1996 as a unification of various Ugandan rebel groups. From this point onwards, the ADF waged an insurgency against the Ugandan government mainly from bases in the eastern Congo whose governments provided it with support during the 1990s. Even after the Congolese leadership terminated its support for the ADF, the latter maintained a large presence in the eastern Congo which was repeatedly ravaged by wars as well as rebellions, becoming a haven for many different insurgent groups.

Over time, the ADF became aligned with a radical Islamism. The group also became more extreme in its methods, and increasingly targeted civilians. As a result of this ideological development, the ADF began to forge connections to international Jihadism; this trend culminated in 2019, when most of the ADF under Musa Baluku pledged loyalty to the Islamic State (IS). After violent disagreements and purges in response to this move, a small faction of the ADF broke off under an individual called "Muzaaya", declaring its continued loyalty to former commander Jamil Mukulu. This splinter subsequently adopted the name "Pan-Ugandan Liberation Initiative" (PULI).

Baluku's ADF faction subsequently became the core of the Islamic State's Central Africa Province (IS-CAP). Profiting from aid by IS-Central, IS-CAP quickly grew in prominence and expanded its activities, launching several high-profile attacks in the DR Congo and Uganda. IS-CAP thus rose to "poster child for the Islamic State's efforts to maintain a constant and lingering threat across the globe". The growth of IS-CAP eventually made the group a "top counter-terrorism priority" for regional states. In late 2021, the ADF/IS-CAP carried out a series of bombing attacks across Uganda, whereupon Ugandan President Yoweri Museveni declared that the responsible militants would be hunted down. Museveni subsequently met with President of the Democratic Republic of the Congo Félix Tshisekedi, and the two agreed to organize a joint operation against ADF/IS-CAP.

== Opposing forces ==
=== Government forces ===
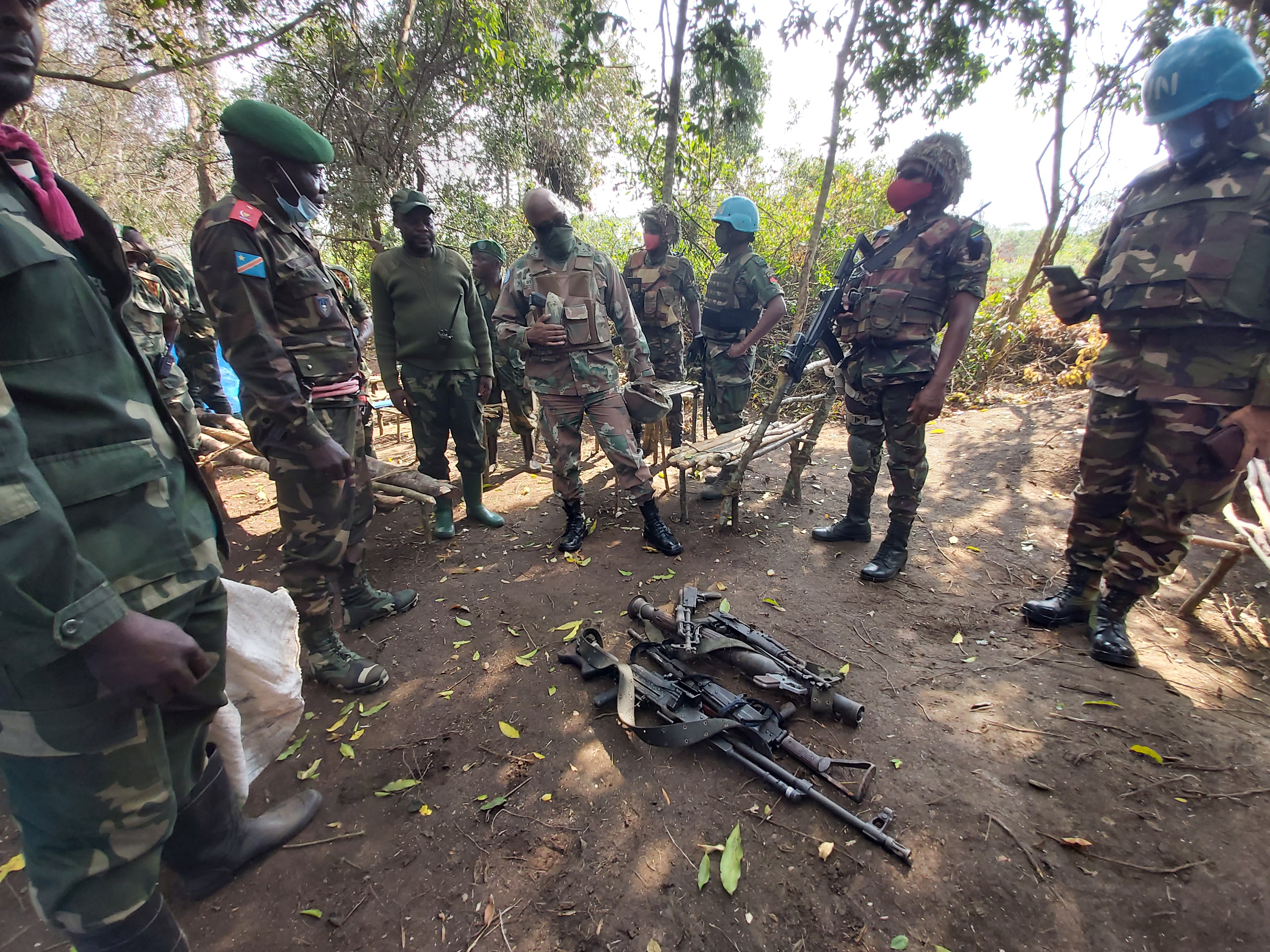
FARDC and MONUSCO soldiers with captured ADF weaponry in Mwalika valley in 2021

Operation Shujaa is carried out by the joint forces of Uganda's national military, the Uganda People's Defence Force (UPDF), and the Armed Forces of the Democratic Republic of the Congo (FARDC). The Ugandan forces initially involved in the offensive numbered "hundreds" or between 2,000 and 4,000 soldiers. By early 2025, the Ugandan force had been reinforced to include about 4,000 to 5,000 soldiers. The operation is mainly carried out by the UPDF Mountain Division. Smaller involved units include the French-trained Mountain Brigade, the 3rd Mountain Battalion, and the 83rd Battalion. The Ugandan forces are under the chief command of Muhoozi Kainerugaba. Under him, Kayanja Muhanga was the first Ugandan frontline commander for the operation, followed by Dick Olum in October 2022, and Richard Otto in May 2024.

FARDC Maj.-Gen. Bombele Lohola Camille acts as the Coordinator of the joint FARDC-UPDF military operations with Maj.-Gen. Kayanja Muhanga as his assistant. The DR Congo committed at least one French-trained battalion to the operation. Though Congolese officials praised the cooperation between FARDC and UPDF during the offensive, several FARDC officers were reportedly "uncomfortable" over the presence of Ugandan soldiers in their country due to previous conflicts between the two states. In addition, the government forces are backed by some Mai-Mai militias. The United Nations peacekeeping force in the DR Congo, MONUSCO, reportedly aided the operation as well.

=== Rebels ===
The ADF, and by extension IS-CAP, is traditionally centered in North Kivu and Ituri. Uganda has alleged that ADF/IS-CAP has thousands of members. IS-CAP's most important commander is Musa Baluku, though Bongela Chuma has also been identified as "alleged" leader of the IS branch. Below these chief commanders served a number of important IS-CAP officers during the offensive: These included Meddie Nkalubo, reportedly second-in-command, and Elias Segujja (alias Mulalo" / "Fezza"), head of the group's "political wing" and the "Southern Sector/Rwenzori-Mwalika". IS-Central has supported IS-CAP with money and other aid.

Compared to IS-CAP, the ADF-Mukulu faction or "PULI" was rather small; at its peak, it numbered 150-200 members. However, it attracted some prominent ADF members besides "Muzaaya", including Benjamin Kisokeranio and one of Mukulu's sons, Hassan Nyanzi. The three together commanded the splinter faction. PULI saw little combat, and spent much of its time hiding from IS-CAP and the UPDF. At times, Operation Shujaa has also targeted rebel groups unrelated to IS and ADF, such as the Force Patriotique et Intégrationniste du Congo (FPIC) and CODECO.

== Operation ==
=== Focus on the "triangle of death" ===
Operation Shujaa was launched on 30 November 2021 by the UPDF. At first, the Ugandan Air Force bombed known ADF/IS-CAP camps, followed by Ugandan ground troops crossing the border and attacking rebel forces inside the DR Congo. From the start, the operation was supported by the FARDC. Fighting was reported around Beni and in the Virunga National Park. According to researcher Jacob Zenn, it was the "most coordinated effort to target ISCAP cells in the DRC to date". The initial aim of the operation was the destruction of the ADF/IS-CAP center at Kambi ya Yua in northern Beni.

In January 2022, leading IS-CAP member Salim Mohammed and PULI commander Benjamin Kisokeranio were captured by security forces in the eastern DR Congo. In the next month, the joint government forces started the operation's second phase by trying to clear and land route from Burasi to Boga. This was supposed to create an interconnected corridor covering Mbau, Ouicha, Eringeti, Kainama, Tchabi, Olamoyo, the Semuliki Bridge, and Mukakati. In this way, substantial rebel forces would be encircled in the zone dubbed "triangle of death" by the Congolese. During the following month, government forces involved in Operation Shujaa clashed with the FPIC rebel group due to attempts by the latter to steal cattle from local civilians. In March, the UPDF and FARDC reportedly killed ADF/IS-CAP commander Abu Aden (a Somali) during a battle at Malulu, north-west of Boga. In contrast to the government's claims by good advances and heavy enemy losses, the Ebuteli Institute and Center on International Cooperation's Congo Research Group cautioned that the UPDF and FARDC claims were not substantiated by third parties, with ADF/IS-CAP seemingly succeeding in retreating in good order toward the Mambasa Territory.

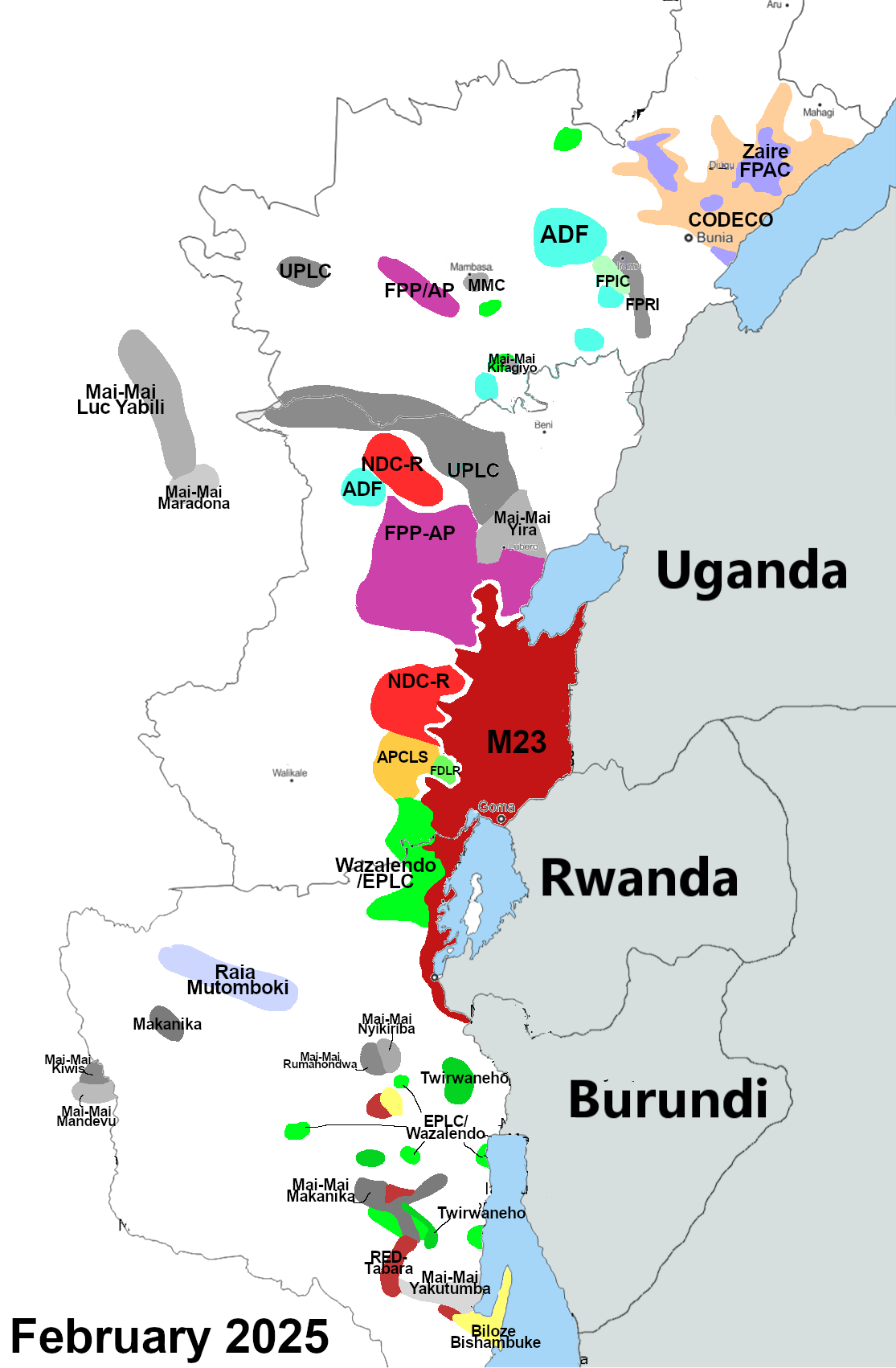
Presence of various rebel groups in Kivu and Ituri, with ADF/IS-CAP marked in turquoise.

By April, the joint government forces were clearing the Beni-Kasindi road and attacking the insurgent strongholds in the Mwalika valley. By May, UPDF and FARDC had concluded the operation's second phase, securing the Beni-Kamango highway and clearing the so-called "triangle of death" of ADF/IS-CAP contingents. The rebels were reportedly retreating across the Ituri River into the Irumu Territory, and still had a significant presence in the Mwalika valley and the Rwenzori Mountains. UPDF head Kainerugaba also claimed that the rebel presence at Semuliki Bridge, Kambi ya Yua, Belu I, II et III, Tondoli, Kainama, and Boga et Tshabi had been eliminated. In June, Operation Shujaa was renewed for another year. By fall, Operation Shujaa's scope was expanded, with three UPDF battalions deployed west of the Semliki River. In November, Uganda announced that it would send an additional 1,000 troops into eastern Congo to help counter another rebel group, the March 23 Movement, and also bombed a major IS-CAP camp under Segujja. The latter attack forced the rebels to relocate their camp southwards. In December 2022, ADF rebels reportedly tried to infiltrate Uganda in Ntoroko District, but were repelled by the UPDF.

=== Collapse of PULI and capture of Mwalika valley ===
By 2023, Operation Shujaa was already described as a success by Uganda and the DR Congo, though IS-CAP continued to operate and launch attacks. According to the United Nations, the group even sought to expand its activities in the region. In January 2023, the UPDF attacked the PULI main camp near Lake Edward; the group survived, but was weakened and relocated its camp. However, this situation was exploited by a large IS-CAP contingent under Segujja which tracked the relocated PULI base and destroyed it. Aside of a few PULI members who fled and surrendered to government forces, the splinter group was eliminated by Segujja's raid; the survivors (including Nyanzi) yielded and joined IS-CAP. In the next month, government aircraft reportedly bombed IS-CAP targets and killed Segujja during clashes in the Mwalika valley, though his death could not be confirmed.

In June 2023, rebels carried out the Mpondwe school massacre in western Uganda. The attack was attributed to ADF militants linked to IS-CAP. On 10 August, an IS-CAP party of 80 militants launched a raid from their bases in Mwalika valley, crossing the Bashu Chiefdom and raiding the city of Butembo. There, the insurgents freed 800 inmates from the Kakwangura prison, although 250 prisoners were reportedly recaptured soon after, including a prominent IS member known as "Kizito". The raiders subsequently retreated back through the Bashu Chiefdom in largely good order, while losing a few fighters to clashes with the FARDC, police, and village militias. In August, the UPDF claimed that it had killed a mid-level ADF/IS-CAP officer named "Fazul" at Alungupa in North Kivu. By September, President Museveni claimed that 560 ADF/IS-CAP members had been killed so far during Operation Shujaa, and urged the DR Congo to mobilize local militias to prevent the rebels from reentering secured areas. At this point, most ADF/IS-CAP insurgents had allegedly fallen back to the Mambasa Territory in Ituri. In the same month, ADF/IS-CAP second-in-command Meddie Nkalubo was allegedly killed by an UPDF airstrike. By the end of the year, the rebels had reportedly been dislodged from the Mwalika valley.

By early 2024, the joint UPDF-FARDC forces had expelled IS-CAP from most of its strongholds. In April 2024, the UPDF declared that its troops and FARDC soldiers had killed two ranking ADF/IS-CAP members: One, known as "Baghdad", was a commander and had been ambushed in Ambusire area, northwest of Tingwe in Ituri; the other, "Dr. Musa", had managed medical logistics and been killed at Mugulumugulu near Tokomeka. By the end of 2024, the area around Beni had become markedly more secure, allowing local curfews to be lifted. ADF/IS-CAP forces had been pushed out of the Rwenzori Mountains and the "triangle of death". The insurgents had split into small groups to stay mobile and hidden, no longer able to concentrate into large camps. Conversely, ADF/IS-CAP continued to demonstrate substantial fighting power, having mostly relocated westward to Irumu and Mambasa in Ituri as well as southward into Tshopo, where it continued to raid and attack civilians. In February 2025, Uganda further reinforced its contingents in the DR Congo, possibly in response to the escalating M23 campaign to the south.

=== Resurgence of ADF/IS-CAP ===
In the second half of 2025, International Crisis Group researcher Onesphore Sematumba assessed that the focus of Operation Shujaa had shifted from weakening the ADF and IS-CAP in general to the protection of areas which were of strategic interest to the Ugandan government. For instance, the UPDF was increasingly deployed in gold-mining areas where ADF/IS-CAP did not operate. In general, the pro-government forces in the region had become stretched, with insurgent attacks on civilians growing in frequency and severity. Major ADF/IS-CAP attacks included the Komanda massacre of July and the Ntoyo massacre of September.

In February 2026, a joint UPDF-FARDC offensive resulted in the capture of an ADF/IS-CAP camp west of Epulu River, with the rebels reportedly losing several fighters as well as a substantial amount of equipment; 12 captives were freed at the camp.

== Reactions ==
No to arsonists/firefighters, the same errors will produce the same tragic effects. Stand up Congolese, Nation in danger!

— Tweet by Denis Mukwege

In the DR Congo, reactions to the start of Operation Shujaa were negative or mixed. Many Congolese expressed opposition to the foreign intervention due to Uganda's destructive role in the Second Congo War, with Nobel Peace Prize winner Denis Mukwege and activist group Lutte pour le changement expressing criticism. In contrast, MONUSCO welcomed Operation Shujaa. By June 2022, the local reception to the operation had grown more positive, with one civil society group, Mamove, expressing the view that the FARDC and UPDF should further expand their operations against ADF/IS-CAP. Local support for Operation Shujaa lessened in late 2025, as the UPDF began to focus more on purely Ugandan interests in the Congo, while ADF/IS-CAP attacks rose once more in frequency.

== Analysis and impact ==
In 2022, the Ebuteli Institute and Center on International Cooperation's Congo Research Group reported that outside observers were critical of Operation Shujaa, with one diplomat likening it to "trying to kill a mosquito with a hammer" and an analyst describing it as merely "a lot of dust and noise". At this point, no substantial impact of the offensive on rebel strength could be identified. Furthermore, the Ebuteli Institute and Congo Research Group argued that the location and scope of the operation possibly hinted at ulterior Ugandan motives connected to economic interests in the wider area.

By 2024, however, Operation Shujaa had a major impact on IS-CAP's propaganda output. For instance, the branch released 280 photos and four videos in 2021, but only 92 photos in 2023. Researchers Caleb Weiss and Ryan O'Farrell stated that IS-CAP's media had been reduced to a "shadow of its former self". ADF/IS-CAP partially rebuilt its strength over the course of 2025, as the local pro-government forces were drawn into other conflicts and increasingly struggled to contain various regional insurgencies.
