= Musa Baluku =

Ugandan militant leader (born c.1977)

- Born: c. 1977 (age 48–49); Kasese District, Uganda
- Other names: Seka Baluku, Abu Abdul-Rahman al-Ugandi, "PC"
- Organization(s): Islamic State (IS), Allied Democratic Forces
- Spouse: 2+ wives

Musa Seka Baluku (born c. 1977) is a Ugandan militant and current leader of the Allied Democratic Forces, a rebel insurgent group in Uganda and the Democratic Republic of the Congo, now largely a part of Islamic State – Central Africa Province. He took over as commander of the ADF following the 2015 arrest of its former leader, Jamil Mukulu, in Tanzania.

Baluku is under sanction by the United Nations and the United States for militant activities.

== Biography ==
Very little is known about Baluku's early life; however, it is known that he was born in the Kasese District of Uganda. The United Nations believes Baluku was born around 1977. Unlike most ADF commanders, who hail from the Baganda and Soga tribes, Baluku is part of the Mukonjo tribe.

Baluku became a Salafi jihadist at an early age, and formerly served as an Imam at the Malakaz mosque in Kampala, Uganda. He was one of the earliest members of the Allied Democratic Forces, and served as one of Jamil Mukulu's chief lieutenants.

After the ADF relocated to the Democratic Republic of the Congo, Mukulu appointed Baluku to numerous positions within the ADF, and he served as the group's chief Islamic judge and handed down punishments to those who violated the group's interpretation of Sharia law. Baluku also served as the ADF's "political commissar", and was in charge of teaching the ADF's ideology to new recruits.

When Jamil Mukulu was arrested in Tanzania in 2015, Musa Baluku took his place as commander of the ADF and appointed himself "Sheikh". Unlike his predecessor, Baluku has expanded his outreach into social media in order to recruit more followers, and has publicly aligned the ADF with better-known jihadist groups such as the Islamic State and Al-Shabaab.

Baluku is a polygamist, and has taken several wives from both the Congo and Uganda, two of them daughters of Jamil Mukulu. He resided in the ADF's main camp, nicknamed "Camp Medina", until the camp was overrun by the Congolese army in January 2020. As of February 2020 he was believed to have relocated to "Camp Kajuju" in "Madina II", another ADF camp complex.

ADF defectors and ex-combatants have described Baluku as notoriously violent and short-tempered. Baluku has ordered the abduction of children to serve as child soldiers and has presided over mass killings of civilians by firing squad. Baluku has also been known to consolidate his power within the ADF through brutal intimidation tactics, and has executed suspected dissidents by beheading or crucifixion.

Baluku is believed to have been wounded during a Ugandan military attack on an ADF camp on 22 December 2017.

In December 2019, the United States government imposed sanctions on Baluku and five other ADF leaders.
