= Jamil Mukulu =

Ugandan militant leader (born 1964)

- Born: Alirabaki Kyagulanyi; 17 April 1964 (age 62); Kayunga District, Uganda
- Other names: Jamil Alirabaki, Mazengo David Amos, Lwanga Thomas Musisi, Nicholas Lumu, Philipp Nyanzi, Yafesi, Abdullah Jjungu, Petanguli Kalemire, Denis Kityo Musoke
- Organization: Allied Democratic Forces
- Criminal charges: Murder, crimes against humanity DRC: Murder, terrorism (in absentia)
- Criminal penalty: DRC: Death (in absentia); Awaiting trial
- Criminal status: In custody, awaiting trial

Jamil Mukulu (born Alirabaki Kyagulanyi) is a Ugandan militant leader and suspected war criminal who was the principal founder and former leader of the Allied Democratic Forces, an armed Islamist rebel group in Uganda and the Democratic Republic of the Congo. Mukulu was arrested in Tanzania in 2015 and is currently awaiting trial in Uganda for charges such as murder and crimes against humanity.

== Biography ==
Jamil Mukulu was born Alirabaki Kyagulanyi in the village of Ntoke in the Kayunga District of Uganda on 17 April 1964, to Lutakome Sserwada and Aisha Nakiyemba. Little is known about his early life, except for the fact that he earned a degree in business management in Nairobi, Kenya.

Although born into a Christian family, Kyagulanyi officially converted to Islam on May 17, 1984, changed his name to "Jamil Mukulu", and studied abroad in Saudi Arabia, where he was introduced to fundamentalist Islamic ideologies, such as Salafism, and became radicalized. Prior to his leadership in the ADF, Mukulu received training in Afghanistan and Pakistan, later becoming an associate of Osama bin Laden. When he returned to Africa, Mukulu, now well connected with numerous global jihadist movements, became involved in the conflict between the Ugandan Muslim Supreme Council and the Tabliq sect, the latter of which Mukulu belonged to.

Mukulu soon began formulating the idea of establishing an Islamic state in Uganda, and, in 1991, he and a group of Tabliq militants attacked the Uganda Muslim Supreme Council (UMSC) headquarters in Old Kampala. Mukulu went to prison for the attack, but was released around 1995.

When Mukulu was released, he joined the National Army for the Liberation of Uganda, a rebel group opposed to the Ugandan government. When the NALU's leader, Amon Bazira, was killed in 1995, Mukulu helped unify numerous separate militant groups into one unit and formed the Allied Democratic Forces, appointing himself as the group's supreme commander. Unable to hold ground in Uganda, Mukulu led his group to the Democratic Republic of the Congo, and set up camp in North Kivu.

Between 1996 and 2001, Mukulu's forces carried out numerous bombings, massacres, and other terror attacks in the Congo, killing an estimated 1,000 civilians and displacing over 150,000 others, according to a UN study published in 2002. Mukulu also gained notoriety for ordering his forces to abduct hundreds of children to train as child soldiers. Even though it is one of the longest-surviving terror groups, ADF-NALU is also the only Islamic militant entity in DRCongo. Uganda’s spy agency, the Chieftaincy of Military Intelligence (CMI) has on several occasions linked ADF-NALU to al-Shabaab. Though linked to other groups in the global jihadi firmament, ADF-NALU has not attracted as much attention as Al Qaeda in the Maghreb (AQIM), Movement for Oneness and Jihad in West Africa (MUJAO), Ansar Dine, al-Shabaab or Boko Haram.

In 2011, Mukulu was placed under sanction by the United Nations for terrorist activities in the Congo.

In 2014, a court in the Democratic Republic of the Congo convicted Mukulu of terrorism and murder, and sentenced him to death in absentia.

In 2015, Mukulu was arrested by police in Tanzania and repatriated to the custody Uganda, where he was charged with murder, war crimes, and crimes against humanity. He is currently awaiting trial.

Despite being under sentence of death in the Congo, Uganda has refused to turn Mukulu over to Congolese authorities.

Since Mukulu's capture, the ADF has been led by one of his lieutenants, Musa Baluku.
