= Allied Democratic Forces =

Ugandan rebel group

- Vikosi vya Muungano wa Kidemokrasia (Swahili); Forces Démocratiques Alliées (French)
- Flag of the ADF
- Leaders: Jamil Mukulu (POW) (leader until 2015); Musa Baluku (leader 2015–2019; commander of pro-IS faction from 2019) "Muzaaya" (commander of Mukulu loyalists from 2019); Dusman Sabuni †
- Dates active: 1996–2019 (unified group); 2019–present (factionalised)
- Headquarters: Madina
- Ideology: Islamism; Baluku faction: Islamic Statism (since 2017); Salafi jihadism; Global caliphate
- Size: 500 (in 2018)
- Part of: Islamic State's Central Africa Province (Baluku faction)
- Wars: Allied Democratic Forces insurgency and Kivu conflict

The Allied Democratic Forces (French: Forces démocratiques alliées; abbreviated ADF) is a Ugandan Islamic extremist rebel group formerly based in western Uganda and currently operating in eastern Democratic Republic of the Congo (DRC). Some refer to the group as IS-DRC as a chapter of IS-CAP, but this term is broader and tends to include non-ADF rebels. It is considered a terrorist organization by the Ugandan government and the United States. The group is sanctioned by the United States and the United Nations Security Council. Originally based in western Uganda, the ADF has expanded into eastern DRC where nearly all of its fighting has occurred. Most ADF fighters are Ugandan Muslims from the Baganda and Basoga ethnic groups. The ADF was the second-deadliest non-state actor against civilians in 2025.

Since the late 1990s, the ADF has operated in the Congo's North Kivu province near the border with Uganda. While repeated military offensives against the ADF have severely affected it, the ADF has been able to regenerate because its recruitment and financial networks have remained intact. Some of the attacks it has been blamed for also appear to have been committed by other rebel groups as well as the Armed Forces of the DRC (FARDC).

The ADF's leadership shifted after the imprisonment of its leader Jamil Mukulu on April 30, 2015. Musa Seka Baluku, Mukulu's second-in-command since 1995, stepped forward in his place shortly after. Under Baluku's leadership, the group began connecting with IS as early as 2017, were formally recognized as a chapter of IS-CAP in 2018, and formally pledged their allegiance to the group in 2019. By 2019, the ADF had split, with one part remaining loyal to Mukulu, while the other had merged into the Islamic State's Central Africa Province under Baluku. The anti-IS splinter group was largely destroyed in 2023.

== Background ==
They initially established their base of operations in the Rwenzori Mountains of western Uganda The ADF chose western Uganda apparently for three reasons: terrain that is ideal for a rural insurgency, proximity to the DRC where the rebels could set up bases and recruit fighters, and the presence of some Ugandan ethnic groups unfriendly to the government that could offer assistance. It received support from the government of Sudan, which was engaged in disputes with the government of Uganda.

== History ==
=== Jamil Mukulu's conversion to Islam ===
Former leader Jamil Mukulu was born into a Christian family but converted to Islam following his adoption of the doctrine of Salafism while completing his studies in Saudi Arabia. Prior to moving back to Africa, he briefly spent time in Afghanistan and Pakistan where he received military training and became an associate of Osama bin Laden. According to a news report by the Uganda Daily Monitor on August 3, 2015, Hajj Nsereko Mutumba, the spokesman of the Uganda Muslim Supreme Council (UMSC) at the time, believed that "when the young Muslims, many of who had travelled and studied in Saudi Arabia, came back to Uganda, they came back with a lot of vigour and sought [to] fight [for] many of these [Salafi] practices." Emphasizing the impacts of universities on this revitalization, Mutumba specifically recounts that "thus was the case with Jamil Mukulu. He studied Islam and immersed himself with the religion['s] doctrines to an extent that he even started passing Fatwas."

=== Pre-ADF aggression ===
==== Mufti election dispute and March 1991 Old Kampala Mosque attack ====
Mukulu was located in the neighborhood of Nakasero during a tight and disputed election of the Old Kampala Mosque's Mufti in 1982. The election was headed by Sheikh Obedi Kamulegeya and Sheikh Kassim Mulumba, promoting Sheikh Saad Luwemba and Sheikh Rajab Kakooza respectively. Luwemba was believed to be pro-Museveni and held religious views promoting last rites and Duwas, which were asymmetrical with those of Muslims in Nakasero. The disputed election was brought to court, during which Kakooza led an interim leadership.

On March 22, 1991, the day the court planned to release the verdict of Luwemba's election, Mukulu led around 1,000 of his followers to attack the UMSC's offices in Old Kampala. Four police officers were killed while Mukulu and between 431 and 434 of his Tablighi followers were jailed in the violent attack.

==== Mukulu's release and creation of the Salaf Foundation ====
It is believed that during his time in Luzira prison, Mukulu and his close colleagues would plan the establishment of a resistance movement and possibly an Islamic State. Upon begin released in 1993 after being acquitted of murder, Mukulu and most of the jailed rebels formed the Salaf Foundation alongside associates in the Salafi and Tablighi movements. Mukulu would go on to found the Uganda Muslim Freedom Fighters (UMFF), the military wing of the Salafi Foundation, shortly after, aimed specifically at rebellion against Museveni's government. The UMFF established its base of operations in Buseruka in western Uganda.

The Uganda People's Defense Force (UPDF) attacked the UMFF's camp in Hoima on February 25, 1995. 98 UMFF members were killed in the attack. Mukulu and the remaining fighters fled into eastern DRC which at the time was under Mobutu Sese Seko's presidency.

=== Formation of the ADF ===
The ADF was formally formed in 1995 as a merger of several rebel factions, including the Allied Democratic Movement, the National Army for the Liberation of Uganda (NALU), and militant members of the Tablighi Jamaat movement. The new coagulate called itself ADF/NALU. The members were largely from central Uganda, in particular Iganga, Masaka, and Kampala, and portray themselves as religious crusaders.

== Territorial control ==
The ADF is known to currently control a number of hidden camps which are home to about 2,000 people; in these camps, the ADF operates as a proto-state with "an internal security service, a prison, health clinics, and an orphanage" as well as schools for boys and girls.

== Operations ==
=== Post-establishment attacks in the late 1990s ===
The ADF launched its first notable attack in November 1996 in Uganda. They used the Rwenzori Mountains in western Uganda as their primary theater. Between 1997 and 2000, rebels destabilized numerous Ugandan districts including Kasese Bundibugyo, Kabarole, and Kyenjojo, displacing large swaths of the population.

=== Low-level operations in the early 2000s ===
Since the 2000s, the ADF has shown no commitment to its original goal of creating an Islamic state except to use it as a narrative to unite its members. By the late 2000s, its leaders had ceased making public proclamations, avoided media and harshly punished runaways. With their methods, the leadership managed to minimize any interactions that might reveal its objectives and activities. This worked to their advantage, allowing them to survive despite repeated military attacks.

While in-depth research explores the group's early years in Uganda, there has been hardly any in-depth academic analysis on its activities since it resurfaced in the Congo in 2010. Per Kristof Titeca, the lack of knowledge has also been exploited by some political players to craft the narratives for their own objectives. In general, the group increasingly intermingled with the local population during this time, with many fighters marrying locals.

=== 2013 resurgence and radicalisation ===
From 2011 to 2013, several hundreds of people were kidnapped in Beni, some by ADF and some by other armed groups. In April 2013, it was reported that ADF started a recruitment campaign in Kampala and other parts of the country. Citing a defector from ADF, AllAfrica.com reported that approximately ten new recruits joined ADF forces every day. In July 2013, the ADF renewed its fighting in the Congolese district of Beni. According to the UN Radio Okapi, the ADF together with the NALU fought a pitched battle with the Military of the Democratic Republic of the Congo (FARDC), briefly taking the towns of Mamundioma and Totolito. On 11 July, the ADF attacked the town of Kamango, triggering the flight of over 60,000 refugees across the border into the Ugandan district of Bundibugyo.

Early in September 2013, regional leaders under the International Conference on the Great Lakes Region (ICGLR) asked the recently formed combative United Nations Force Intervention Brigade under the United Nations Organization Stabilization Mission in the Democratic Republic of the Congo to attack positions of foreign negative forces operating in the DRC, including the ADF. In late September 2013, 3 people were killed and 30 abducted during an ADF attack in the Watalinga Sector, North Kivu, DRC.

In January 2014, the FARDC launched a major offensive against ADF forces in Beni. By April, Mukulu and other senior leaders of the group fled their headquarters camp from approaching FARDC forces. The remaining ADF fighters– alongside women and children – retreated into the forest, where their numbers were significantly reduced in the following months as a result of starvation, desertion, and continued FARDC attacks. Mukulu and others moved into exile. From this point onwards, the ADF fell under the control of the old second-in-command Musa Baluku. Under his leadership, the ADF became increasingly radical and brutal in its operations, launching more attacks on civilians.

From October to December 2014, 250 people were killed for which ADF was solely blamed by the DRC government and MONUSCO. The Congo Research Group however stated that FARDC soldiers, former members of RCD–K/ML as well as members of communal militias were also involved. From December 2014 to January 2015, three Muslim clerics were killed by unknown assailants. Six alleged ADF members were arrested. However, the government did not show any evidence for ADF links. On 30 March 2015, an Ugandan government spokesman had initially blamed ADF and then al-Shabaab for assassination of government prosecutor Joan Kagezi, without offering evidence in either case. In late April 2015, the ADF's leader, Jamil Mukulu, was arrested in Tanzania. In July 2015, he was extradited to Uganda. Despite Mukulu's attempts to keep influencing the ADF from prison, Musa Baluku consequently cemented his power and moved the ADF closer to international jihadism.

As of November 2015, the number of attacks on Congolese forces continued, with weekly attacks of varying size taking place and killing more than 400 people in 2015, especially in the territories of Beni (North Kivu) and Irumu (Ituri). The ADF have been blamed for the 2016 Beni massacre and also for an attack in North Kivu on 7 December 2017, which killed 15 UN peacekeepers, all Tanzanians, as well as 5 Congolese soldiers.

=== Split and Baluku's allegiance to IS ===
From 2017, ADF elements began to forge connections to the Islamic State (IS). In June 2019, an IS propaganda video showed Musa Baluku pledging allegiance to IS. A "major faction" of the ADF joined Baluku, but a group of Mukulu loyalists opposed to this course consequently split off. The splinter faction was believed to be small, counting 10 to 30 fighters as well as their followers, and to be led by a man known as "Muzaaya". Muzaaya had previously served as a commander for ADF's southern division, the "Mwalika camp"; his splinter was believed to be based along the Semliki River in the Virunga National Park. Muzaaya's group included at least one senior commander, Benjamin Kisokeranio, and was rumoured to enjoy support from Mukulu's son Hassan Nyanzi who is based in South Africa. The ADF's international support network was also affected by the split; several supporters attempted to stay neutral and declare no allegiance to either the Mukulu loyalists or Baluku's followers.

The Armed Forces of the Democratic Republic of the Congo (FARDC) conducted large-scale operations from late 2019 to late 2020 that greatly weakened the ADF, killing hundreds of its fighters. According to the International Crisis Group, the ADF completely splintered during these operations, and the rival factions also distanced themselves from each other geographically. Some ADF elements moved to the Rwenzori Mountains, while others had relocated into Ituri Province where they attacked civilians. Despite these setbacks, ADF forces have been associated with 800 deaths and a prison escape in 2020 in the Democratic Republic of the Congo. In 2020, Baluku claimed that the ADF had ceased to exist and was succeeded by the Islamic State's Central Africa Province. Meanwhile, the anti-IS splinter of the ADF adopted the name "Pan-Ugandan Liberation Initiative" (PULI) and largely spent its existence moving its mobile camp in the Congolese jungles, rarely engaging in combat operations. PULI was effectively destroyed by a series of UPDF and IS-CAP attacks in January 2023, with the survivors either surrendering to pro-government forces or join IS-CAP.

In April 2024, a joint operation between the armies of the DRC and Uganda enabled the neutralization of two ADF leaders, nicknamed Doctor “Musa”, and the other Commander “Baghdad”.

=== 2026 Ebola outbreak and humanitarian impact ===
The Allied Democratic Forces (ADF) have had a tangible and disruptive impact on civilian life and public health operations in eastern Democratic Republic of the Congo. During the 2026 Ebola outbreak in Ituri province, ongoing insecurity linked to the ADF and other armed groups severely constrained the movement of health workers and surveillance teams, limiting their ability to reach affected communities. Some health and aid personnel were forced to evacuate remote outbreak zones and relocate to Bunia, the provincial capital, where security conditions were comparatively stable. In addition, poor road infrastructure and active rebel presence made many areas logistically inaccessible for contact tracing efforts, and it remains uncertain how many communities were entirely cut off from epidemiological monitoring. The ADF, which has declared allegiance to the Islamic State group, is one of several militias operating in Ituri and has been implicated in exacerbating the humanitarian and health crises in the region.

== Foreign involvement ==
The DRC government, citing civil society groups in North Kivu, says that Al-Shabaab fighters from Somalia are collaborating with the ADF. Uganda has claimed that there is a link between them with al-Shabaab and al-Qaeda. In-depth reports have denied this link, stating that there is contact but not real integration. MONUSCO has accused it of having extensive links to international Islamist groups such as al-Qaeda, al-Shabaab, al-Qaeda (in the Maghreb) and Boko Haram.

The Washington Post and World Policy Institute however have considered MONUSCO's single source as dubious. In 2021, the group claimed at least one attack near Kampala that killed one and injured 7. The deadliest terror incident in Ugandan history was a 2010 attack in the capital Kampala, claimed by Al-Shabab. 74 people who had assembled in public places in Kampala to watch a World Cup soccer game were killed in those FIFA World Cup bombings.

An Islamic State financier (Waleed Ahmed Zein) is said to have paid the group at least once according to a report of the New York University's Congo Research Group.
