= List of terrorist incidents by the Allied Democratic Forces =

Flag of the Allied Democratic Forces

The following is a list of documented terrorist attacks and massacres that have been connected, suspected, or confirmed to have been committed by the Allied Democratic Forces (ADF), a Ugandan Islamist rebel group. Attacks and massacres, not including subsequent protests, in this list are either notably reported or include three of more deaths—a general threshold for mass murder. For all events of armed conflict including the ADF, see the timeline of their insurgency.

== Background ==
The ADF have led an insurgency since 1996 which, despite originally being based in western Uganda, has expanded into the eastern Democratic Republic of the Congo (DRC) where nearly all of its fighting has occurred. Intensifying since 2013, the ADF began committing a significantly larger number of massacres, perpetrated primarily by the group's Islamic State (IS)–aligned fighters, led by Musa Seka Baluku since April 2015, (Note: The group has generally been considered to have joined the Islamic State – Central Africa Province in 2018 which served as a prelude to Baluku officially pledging allegiance to the IS in 2019.) who had initially served as the founding leader Jamil Mukulu's second-in-command. According to the Armed Conflict Location and Event Data (ACLED) group, the ADF was the second-deadliest non-state actor against civilians in 2025.

== Attacks ==
Title	Date	Location	Description	Dead	Victims	Weapons	Ref
2017 Semuliki attack	7 December 2017	Semuliki, North Kivu, DRC	Suspected ADF militants attacked elements of a MONUSCO operating base in the Beni Territory with mortars, RPGs and light arms—destroying numerous UN vehicles. The attack killed 15 MONUSCO personnel, injured 53 others, and left 1 missing; killed 5 FARDC soldiers; and claimed to have left 72 of the estimated 100 ADF militant assailants dead.	15 (MONUSCO)	53 (injured) and 1 (missing) (MONUSCO)	Light arms, mortars, and rocket-propelled grenades	
2017 Semuliki attack	7 December 2017	Semuliki, North Kivu, DRC	Suspected ADF militants attacked elements of a MONUSCO operating base in the Beni Territory with mortars, RPGs and light arms—destroying numerous UN vehicles. The attack killed 15 MONUSCO personnel, injured 53 others, and left 1 missing; killed 5 FARDC soldiers; and claimed to have left 72 of the estimated 100 ADF militant assailants dead.	5 (FARDC)	Unknown (FARDC)	Light arms, mortars, and rocket-propelled grenades	
2017 Semuliki attack	7 December 2017	Semuliki, North Kivu, DRC	Suspected ADF militants attacked elements of a MONUSCO operating base in the Beni Territory with mortars, RPGs and light arms—destroying numerous UN vehicles. The attack killed 15 MONUSCO personnel, injured 53 others, and left 1 missing; killed 5 FARDC soldiers; and claimed to have left 72 of the estimated 100 ADF militant assailants dead.	72 (ADF)	Unknown (ADF)	Light arms, mortars, and rocket-propelled grenades	
2020 Kangbayi prison break	20 October 2020	Kangbayi prison, Beni, Ituri Province, DRC	ADF militants attacked the prison and neighboring military camp in Kangbayi, holding imprisoned ADF and Mai-Mai fighters. The attack killed 2 prisoners and freed 1,335.	2	Unknown	Unknown	

== Massacres ==
All massacres are assumed to include predominantly civilian fatalities, which doesn't preclude non-combatants and fighters of any kind from being included; specificity between them may be provided in the main article.

Title	Date	Location	Description	Dead	Victims	Weapons	Ref
Beni massacre	14 August 2016	Rwangoma District, Beni, North Kivu, DRC	Suspected ADF militants killed upwards of 64 to 101 civilians in a raid on Rwangoma District in the city of Beni. The killing occurred as part of a series of killings in and around the city of Beni that had left over 700 people dead since October 2014.	64–101+	Unknown	Light arms (butts) and melee weapons	
Beni massacre	18 August 2016	Rwangoma District, Beni, North Kivu, DRC	Following the ADF massacre, mass protests broke out against the hypocrisy of President Joseph Kabila—turning bloody when both civilians and police turned on protesters.	3	15 (injured)	Light arms	
January 2020 Oicha massacres	28–30 January 2020	Mamove, Mantumbi, Manzingi and other towns in Oicha Territory, DRC	ADF militants killed over 73 civilians in towns across Oicha Territory. They attacked some in their homes and in vehicles, before sometimes also setting fire to them.	73+	Unknown	Machetes and arson	
Baeti massacre	28–29 October 2020	Baeti, North Kivu, DRC	ADF militants killed 19 civilians in Baeti during the night. They were suspected to enter the town at 2:00 p.m. before beginning the attack at 7:00 p.m. CAT—killing villages before setting fire to the village's Kimbanguiste church and approximately 40 buildings.	19	Unknown	Light arms, bladed weapons, and arson	
Lisasa massacre	31 October 2020	Lisasa, Kitsimba, and Kamwiri, North Kivu, DRC	ADF militants, after clashes with a group belonging to the Mai-Mai, killed over 21 civilians between 8:00 p.m. and 12:00 a.m. CAT; subsequent massacres killing an unknown number of civilians were carried out in the nearby towns of Kitsimba and Kamwiri.	21+	20 (kidnapped)	Unknown	
Tingwe massacre	31 December 2020	Tingwe, Mwenda, and Nzenga, North Kivu, DRC	ADF militants killed over 30 civilians with several other kidnapped as well. Subsequent massacres were carried out in the nearby towns of Mwenda and Nzenga.	30+	Several (kidnapped)	Machetes, axes, and arson	
Mwenda massacre	4 January 2021	Mwenda, Beni Territory, North Kivu, DRC	ADF militants killed 23 civilians and injured 10 more beginning at 7:00 p.m. CAT, going door-to-door bludgeoning, and shooting residents; village buildings were looted.	23	10 (injured)	Light arms, machetes, and blunt weapons	
Bulongo massacre	15 March 2021	Bulongo, Beni Territory, North Kivu, DRC	ADF militants killed 15 civilians between 10:00 and 2:00 a.m. CAT, reportedly slaughtering anyone they saw, including beheading and gutting victims.	15+	Unknown	Machetes and pickaxes	
Bulongo massacre	16 March 2021	Bulongo, Beni Territory, North Kivu, DRC	The delayed response of MONUSCO was protested, whose crowds were dispersed by police gunfire, killing 1 civilian.	1	Unknown	Light arms	
Boga and Tchabi massacres	30–31 May 2021	Boga and Tchabi, Ituri, DRC		57+	47+ (injured), 25+ (kidnapped), and 5,800+ (displaced)	Light arms and arson	
Maimoya highway massacre	22 July 2021	Mayi-moya–Chani-chani highay, Beni Territory, North Kivu, DRC	Suspected ADF militants killed 16 civilians and injured 9 more in an RPG strike on a convoy of civilians returning from a market along the highway connecting Mayi-moya and Chani-chani.	16	9 (injured)	Rocket-propelled grenades	
Kasanzi massacre	28–29 August 2021	Kasanzi, Beni Territory, North Kivu, DRC	Suspected ADF militants killed 19 or more civilians, attacking some while they were returning to or fleeing from the village before looting and setting fire to their homes.	19+	Unknown	Light arms,machetes, and arson	
Makutano massacre	3 September 2021	Makutano, Beni Territory, North Kivu, DRC		30+	Unknown	Machetes	
Masambo massacre	3–4 April 2022	Masambo, North Kivu, DRC	ADF militants killed 29 civilians including 1 soldier, attacking some in their homes and others primarily as they fled the village. Three other villages were attacked later that night.	29	Unknown	Light arms and knives	
Otomabere massacre	5 June 2022	Bwanasura and other villages, Otomabere, Irumu Territory, North Kivu, DRC		36	Unknown	Light arms, knives, and arson	
Kandoyi and Bandiboli massacres	5–7 August 2022	Kandoyi and Bandiboli, Ituri, DRC		15–20+	Unknown	Knives	
August 2022 North Kivu massacres	25–30 August 2022	North Kivu, DRC	ADF militants killed over 40 to 54 civilians and kidnapped 76 more in attacks on six villages across North Kivu. The massacres included attacks on military outposts. ADF militants bludgeoned multiple women to death.	40–54+	76 (kidnapped)	Light arms, machetes, melee weapons, and arson	
Kasindi church bombing	15 January 2023	Kasindi, North Kivu, DRC		17	39 (injured)	Bomb	
Makugwe massacre	22 January 2023	Makugwe, North Kivu, DRC		17–24	3 (missing) and several (kidnapped)	Light arms, machetes, and arson	
Mukondi massacre	8–9 March 2023	Mukondi, North Kivu, DRC	ADF militants killed over 36 to 44 civilians and injured over 17 others, slaughtering residents with machetes after coming into the village "like visitors" as it was celebrating International Women's Day. They subsequently set fire to homes and a clinic.	36–44+	17+ (injured)	Machetes and arson	
Kirindera massacre	12 March 2023	Kirindera, Beni Territory, North Kivu, DRC	ADF militants killed 19 civilians and kidnapped an unknown number of others at 1:00 a.m. CAT, slaughtering them in the valley path from which the ADF entered, a health center, and a motel.	19	Several (kidnapped)	Light arms, machetes, and arson	
Musandaba massacre	7 April 2023	Musandaba, Beni Territory, North Kivu, DRC	ADF militants killed over 26 civilians, slaughtering and beheading primarily farmers as they were working in their fields. The ADF later claimed it was targeting "Christians."	26+	Unknown	Machetes	
Mpondwe school massacre	16 June 2023	Mpondwe, Kasese District, Uganda		42	8 (injured)	Petrol bombs and machetes	
October 2023 Oicha massacre	23 October 2023	Oicha, North Kivu, DRC	ADF militants killed over 26 civilians, slaughtering them with machetes so as not to alert authorities. The attack was a reprisal for the FARDC's bombing of ADF camps in the Tingwe forest.	26+	60+ (injured)	Machetes	
2024 East Congo massacres	19–20 February 2024	Beni Territory, North Kivu and Mambasa Territory, Ituri, DRC	ADF militants killed over 24 civilians, slaughtering them primarily in their homes in towns and villages in the Beni and Mambasa territories. They stole some victims' corpses before leaving the areas.	24+	Unknown	Light arms and machetes	
January 2024 Beni massacres	28–30 January 2024	Bayeti, Mangadola, Makodu, Mangazi, Matadi, and several other villages, Beni, DRC	ADF militants killed 13 to 20 civilians in several villages, five of whom were in prayer in the Branhamist Pentecostal community's Message du Temps church. They looted and set fire to homes before taking 30 civilians hostage.	13–20	30 (kidnapped)	Light arms, machetes, other bladed weapons, and arson	
Makoko and Masakuki massacres	15 January 2025	Makoko, Lubero Territory, North Kivu, DRC	ADF militants killed over 10 to 41 civilians in Makoko and 12 others in Masakuki, stabbing them with knives and setting fire to homes, according to claims made in posts later attributed to the group.	10–41+	16 (kidnapped)	Knives and arson	
Matolo and Samboko massacre	25–28 February 2025	Matolo, Samboko, and several other villages, Mambasa Territory, Ituri, DRC	ADF militants killed over 23 civilians across villages in Mambasa Territory, along the border with Uganda. The attack was executed in the wake of M23 attacks in the area, which additionally suspended humanitarian assessments in the area.	23+	20+ (kidnapped)	Unknown	
Maiba massacre	12–15 February 2025	Maiba, North Kivu, DRC	Suspected ADF militants killed and beheaded over 70 civilians, some of which had their hands bound, in a church following what was believed to be a death march from those kidnapped in nearby villages on 12 February.	70+	100+ (kidnapped)	Machetes	
Komanda massacre	27 July 2025	Komanda, Ituri, DRC	ADF militants killed 43 to 50 civilians beginning at 1:00 a.m. CAT, attacking a night vigil being held at the Saint Anuarite church. They subsequently set fire to buildings and vehicles in Komanda town, burning some civilians alive, and kidnapped others while leaving the town.	43–50	12–14 (missing) and thousands (displaced)	Light arms,machetes, and arson	
Ntoyo massacre	8 September 2025	Ntoyo, North Kivu, DRC	ADF militants killed over 71 or less than 100 civilians beginning at 9:00 p.m. CAT, slaughtering attendees of a funeral wake before subsequently burning homes and vehicles, including burning some civilians alive. A separate ADF attack in an adjacent Beni town killed 18.	71–100	Most residents (displaced)	Light arms, machetes, hammers, and arson	
Byambwe massacre	13–19 November 2025	Byambwe and several other villages, Lubero, DRC	ADF militants killed 89 civilians throughout several locations, slaughtering and burning them alive, including in a fire set to a health clinic's housing ward in Byambwe where they, furthermore, slit the throats of breastfeeding women in their hospital beds.	89+	Unknown	Light arms, machetes, knives, and arson	
May 2026 East Congo massacres	5–7 May 2026	Biakato, Katerain, Mangambo, Ikaya, Ndalya and other villages, Ituri and North Kivu, DRC	ADF militants killed over 40 civilians, including 20 in Biakato alone, slaughtering some within villages and others in farmlands with light arms and machetes, before looting and setting fires to homes.	36–44+	Several (missing)	Light arms, machetes, and arson	
