= List of massacres in the Democratic Republic of the Congo =

This is a list of massacres in the Democratic Republic of the Congo in reverse chronological order.

== List of massacres from 1890 to current ==
Name	Date	Fatalities	Location – Circumstances
Kasanga massacre	12 February 2025	70+	North Kivu, Lubero Territory – At least 70 Christian civilians were abducted by Allied Democratic Forces (ADF) militants that entered the village of Mayba. They were executed by beheading via machetes and their bodies were discovered on February 14 in a Protestant church in Kasanga.
2025 Djaiba massacre	9–10 February 2025	55+	Ituri Province, Djaiba group of villages and Djaiba refugee camp – CODECO attacked a refugee camp and villages. At least 33 adults and 18 children were killed.
2023 Goma massacre	27 or 30 August 2023	56	North Kivu, Goma – Protestors were shot dead by defence and security force personnel.
2023 LALA camp massacre	11 June 2023	46	Ituri Province, Djugu territory, near Bule, LALA refugee camp – An attack on the camp killed 46 displaced people, including 23 children. People were killed with guns and machetes, or burned alive in their tents.
2023 April massacres	April 2023	~250	Ituri Province (Djugu, Irumu and Mambasa territories), North-Kivu (Beni and Lubero territories) – 250 civilians were killed in separate attacks on their villages in one month.
Kirindera massacre	12 March 2023	19	North Kivu, Beni Territory, Kirindera
Mukondi massacre	8–9 March 2023	39-44	North Kivu, Mukondi
Makugwe massacre	January 22, 2023	17-24	North Kivu, Makugwe
Kishishe massacre	21–30 November 2022	131-300+	North Kivu, Rutshuru Territory, Bwito Chiefdom
North Kivu attacks	August 25 and 30, 2022	54+	North Kivu
Otomabere massacre	June 5, 2022	18-27	Ituri Province, Irumu Territory, Otomabere – Suspected Allied Democratic Forces attack.
Masambo attack	April 3–4, 2022	29	North Kivu, Masambo
Plaine Savo massacre	February 2, 2022	60	Ituri Province, Djugu territory
Makutano massacre	September 3, 2021	30+	North Kivu, Oicha Territory, Makutano
Drodro massacre	November 21, 2021	44	Ituri Province, Djugu territory, Drodro (refugee camp)
Kasanzi attack	August 28, 2021	19	North Kivu, Beni Territory
Maimoya highway massacre	July 22, 2021	16	North Kivu, Beni Territory, highway between Mayi-Moya and Chani-chani
Boga and Tchabi massacres	May 30 and 31, 2021	57+	Ituri Province, Boga and Tchabi
Bulongo massacre	March 15, 2021	15+	North Kivu, Beni Territory, Bulongo
Mwenda massacre	January 4, 2021	23	North Kivu, Beni Territory, Mwenda
Tingwe massacre	December 31, 2020	30+	North Kivu, Tingwe
Lisasa massacre	October 31, 2020	21	North Kivu, Beni Territory, Lisasa
Kipupu massacre	July 16, 2020	18-220	South Kivu, Mwenga Territory, Kipupu
Ndjala massacre	May 17, 2020	22+	Ituri Province, Ndjala, Hema village
April 2020 Virunga National Park massacre	April 24, 2020	17	North Kivu, Virunga National Park
Oicha massacres	January 28–30, 2020	73+	North Kivu, Oicha Territory, Mamove, Mantumbi, Manzingi, and other towns west of Oicha
2018 Yumbi massacre	16-18 December 2018	890+	Mai-Ndombe Province, Yumbi, Bongende, Nkolo and Camp Nbanzi
Beni massacre	August 14, 2016	101	North Kivu, Beni
Masisi massacre	January and February 2014	70+	North Kivu, Masisi area, three villages – Civilians were executed with machetes and their villages burnt to the ground.
2014 Mutarule attack	June 6, 2014	35	South Kivu, Mutarule, near Luberizi
Makombo massacre	14-17 December 2009	321-345	Haut-Uele District, Makombo – Attack by the Christian terrorist Lord's Resistance Army.
2008 Christmas massacres	24-27 December 2008	620-860+	Haut-Uele District – Attack by the Christian terrorist Lord's Resistance Army.
Kiwanja massacre	4-5 November 2008	150	North Kivu – Perpetrated by the National Congress for the Defence of the People.
Bogoro massacre	24 February, 2003	200+	Ituri Province, Bogoro
Effacer le tableau	October 2002 to January 2003	60,000-70,000	Ituri Province, Mambasa and the Ituri rainforest
Kisangani massacre	13-15 May 2002	183	Tshopo, Kisangani
Mouyounzi massacre	April to June 1998	300	
Butembo massacre	From February 20 to April 1998	300-600	Butembo – Reprisals for Mayi Mayi attacks by Congolese Armed Forces.
Makobola massacre	From December 30, 1998, to January 2, 1999	800+	South Kivu, Makobola – The forces of the Rally for Congolese Democracy (Rassemblement Congolais pour la Démocratie; RCD) perpetrated a massacre, resulting in the death of over 800 civilians, predominantly from the Bembe community.
Kasika massacre	September 5, 1998	1,000+	South Kivu, Mwenga Territory, Kasika – Massacre of Nyindu during the Second Congo War. The figure of 1,000 was estimated by the United Nations Mapping Report. The massacre was actually a series of massacres that began with the killing of 36 Nyindu civilians inside a Catholic church by Rwanda, Ugandan, or Banyamulenge forces.
Massacres of Hutus during the First Congo War	1996-1997	200,000-233,000	Kivu (Zaire)
Chimanga camp massacre	November 17, 1996	300+	South Kivu, Bukavu, Chimanga refugee camp – Rwandan and Burundian Hutu refugees were killed by 40 rebels.
Musekera massacre	October 20, 1996	300	Rutshuru district, Musekera – Three hundred Hutu civilians were bludgeoned to death by Rwandan soldiers.
Lemera massacre	October 6, 1996	37	South Kivu, Lemera – 37 individuals, including FAZ (Forces Armées Zaïroises) soldiers, nurses, patients, and Zairean civilians who were in the vicinity of the Lemera hospital, were killed by the forces of the Alliance of Democratic Forces for the Liberation of Congo (AFDL).
	20 March to July 1993	14,000+	North Kivu, Walikale territory, Masisi territory, Rutshuru territory – Initially starting in the town of Mtutu, as an anti-Banyarwanda massacre by Hunde and Nyanga people, Banyarwanda fought back, starting an ethnic conflict that killed 14,000 people. Ntoto market massacre killed 500 people.
Mokoto monastery massacre	May 12, 1996	750	North Kivu, Mokoto monastery – 750 Tutsi refugees hiding in a monastery were slaughtered by Hutu forces.
Luamwela massacre	5 July 1979	50	Kasaï-Oriental, Luamwela – Killing of 50 miners by the Congolese army and the Societé Minière de Bakwanga.
Katelakayi massacre	July 19, 1979	140-200	Katelakayi – Killing of at least 140 miners by the Congolese army and the Societé Minière de Bakwanga. Some reports said that over 200 miners had died.
Battle of Kolwezi	18–22 May 1978	Hundreds	Lualaba Province, Kolwezi – The Congolese National Liberation Front massacred hundreds of White European civilians during Shaba II, mostly Belgians.
Congo massacre	November 1964	8+	Tshopo Province, Stanleyville and Haut-Uele Province, Paulis – Four Protestant missionaries, four Spanish nuns, and an unknown number of Catholic priests were brutally murdered by Simba rebels during the Simba rebellion. See also: Operation Dragon Rouge
Kindu atrocity	11 or 12 November 1961	13	Congo-Léopoldville – Murders of 13 Italian airmen by soldiers during the Congo Crisis.
Port Francqui incident	April 28, 1961	47	Kasai province, Port Francqui (Ilebo)
1961 Luluabourg massacre	27-28 February, 1961	44	Luluabourg – The New York Times reported that 44 civilians had been killed by government forces in revenge for the killing of three soldiers by rioters.
1959 Luluabourg massacre	October 1959	300+	Luluabourg – By Lulua people against Baluba people.
Léopoldville riots	January 1959	49+	Belgian Congo
Elisabethville Massacre	December 1941	30-70	Katanga Province
1911 Hema massacre	4 December 1911	200+	Ituri Province – By Lendu people against Hema people.
Belgian Mission - Congo Genocide	1890–1910	1 - 10 millions	Congo Free State – By King Leopold II, the constitutional monarch of Belgium, against African Congolese people. In the 19th century, Leopold II tried to persuade the government to colonize certain areas of Africa. Under the pretext of humanitarian purposes, he managed to legally own the Kongo Kingdom. The new name given to the colonized Kongo Kingdom was Congo Free State. See also: Atrocities in the Congo Free State

== See also ==
- Lists of Democratic Republic of the Congo attacks
- Attacks on humanitarian workers
- Dongo conflict
