= October 2023 Oicha massacre =

- Part of Allied Democratic Forces insurgency
- Location: Masosi neighborhood, Oicha, North Kivu, Democratic Republic of the Congo
- Date: October 23, 2023; 11pm
- Target: Civilians
- Weapon: Machetes
- Deaths: 26+
- Injuries: 60+
- Perpetrator: ISCAP
- Defender: FARDC
- Motive: Reprisal for FARDC bombing of ISCAP camps in the Tingwe forest

The October 2023 Oicha massacre was perpetrated on 23 October 2023 by Allied Democratic Forces (ADF) militants, who attacked the outskirts of the town of Oicha, North Kivu, Democratic Republic of the Congo, killing over 26 civilians and injuring 60 or more.

== Background ==
Following the radicalization of its founding leader, Jamil Mukulu, the ADF was formed as a merger of several rebel groups (initially called ADF/NALU) in 1995. The ADF initially operated in western Uganda but has since, and currently continues to operate solely in the eastern DRC; this includes the North Kivu and Ituri Provinces.

The ADF's leadership shifted after the imprisonment of Mukulu on 30 April 2015. Musa Seka Baluku, Mukulu's second-in-command since the group's formation, stepped forward in his place shortly after. Under Baluku's leadership, the group made contact with the Islamic State (IS) as early as 2017, were formally recognized as a chapter of IS–Central Africa Province (IS-CAP) in 2018, and formally pledged their allegiance to the IS in 2019. By that year, the ADF had split, with one part remaining loyal to Mukulu and the other to Baluku; the latter renewed their allegiance to the IS in April 2022. Since joining IS-CAP, the ADF increasingly targeted civilians into their attacks.

In response to growing causalities at the hands of the ADF, the Congolese and Ugandan armed forces created a joint military force called Operation Shujaa in November 2021. The Operation's already mixed perception, due to views of Uganda's role in the Second Congo War, was further put into question regarding its effectiveness in actually preventing ADF attacks.

Oicha and surrounding villages have been a hub of activity of the ADF. The group has routinely massacred civilians, usually Christians, in massacres around the town and on its outskirts, as in the January 2020 Oicha massacres. Prior to the massacre, Congolese forces had bombed ISCAP camps in the Tingwe forest outside Oicha.

== Prelude ==
The Congolese army had received information on October 23 about ISCAP seeking to conduct a reprisal attack inside Oicha for the bombing, and Congolese officers even met in Oicha hours before the massacre discussing this possibility. According to Operation Sukola I spokesman Anthony Mwalushayi, "as [unit commanders] were speaking, the enemy already had vehicles in the town of Oicha thanks to their collaborators who were already in the town."

== Massacre ==
At about 11pm on the night of October 23, three groups of ISCAP militants entered the Masosi neighborhood on the outskirts of Oicha. The militants began slaughtering civilians with machetes instead of guns so as to not arouse the army. The first group of militants was dispatched to prevent military intervention in the massacre, the second to loot civilian stores, and the third to kill civilians. At least 26 people were killed in the massacre, including twelve children, and another sixty were injured. Several homes of entire families were wiped out by the jihadists. The Congolese army did end up responding to the attack, but Mwalushayi said that it was too late.

== Aftermath and reactions ==
The following day, protests broke out in Oicha as the bodies of the victims were being taken to the town's morgue. Four vehicles at a World Food Programme food distribution event were burned by the protesters.
