= Musandaba massacre =

Terrorist incident in Democratic Republic of the Congo

- Part of Allied Democratic Forces insurgency of the Kivu conflict
- Location: Musandaba, Beni Territory, North Kivu, Democratic Republic of the Congo
- Date: April 7, 2023
- Target: Christians
- Deaths: 26+
- Perpetrator: Islamic State - Central Africa Province

On April 7, 2023, jihadists from the Islamic State – Central Africa Province (ISCAP), also known as the Allied Democratic Forces, attacked the village of Musandaba, Beni Territory, North Kivu, Democratic Republic of the Congo, killing 26 people.

== Background ==
Following the radicalization of its founding leader, Jamil Mukulu, the ADF was formed as a merger of several rebel groups (initially called ADF/NALU) in 1995. The ADF initially operated in western Uganda but has since, and currently continues to operate solely in the eastern DRC; this includes the North Kivu and Ituri Provinces.

The ADF's leadership shifted after the imprisonment of Mukulu on 30 April 2015. Musa Seka Baluku, Mukulu's second-in-command since the group's formation, stepped forward in his place shortly after. Under Baluku's leadership, the group made contact with the Islamic State (IS) as early as 2017, were formally recognized as a chapter of IS–Central Africa Province (IS-CAP) in 2018, and formally pledged their allegiance to the IS in 2019. By that year, the ADF had split, with one part remaining loyal to Mukulu and the other to Baluku; the latter renewed their allegiance to the IS in April 2022. Since joining IS-CAP, the ADF increasingly targeted civilians into their attacks.

In response to growing causalities at the hands of the ADF, the Congolese and Ugandan armed forces created a joint military force called Operation Shujaa in November 2021. The Operation's already mixed perception, due to views of Uganda's role in the Second Congo War, was further put into question regarding its effectiveness in actually preventing ADF attacks.

Shortly before the massacre in Musandaba, ISCAP militants killed over 30 people in the Mukondi massacre.

== Massacre ==
On the late afternoon of April 7, ISCAP militants entered the town of Musandaba and attacked farmers in their fields. Many were beheaded while working. The assailants used machetes to avoid alerting any nearby Congolese troops. Nineteen bodies arrived at the Oicha General Hospital, although at least 22 were reported to be killed in the initial report. On April 11, five new bodies were discovered, bringing the total number of killed to 25. One civilian was killed in Mavete.

The Islamic State claimed responsibility for the massacre on April 8, claiming it was targeting "Christians." The Vicar of Babwisi Parish confirmed that several of the victims were Christians.
