= Maimoya highway massacre =

Terrorist incident in Democratic Republic of the Congo in 2021

- Part of Allied Democratic Forces insurgency of the Kivu conflict
- Location: Mayi-Moya-Chani-chani highway, Beni Territory, North Kivu, Democratic Republic of the Congo
- Date: 22 July 2021
- Target: Civilians
- Deaths: 16
- Injuries: 9
- Perpetrator: ISCAP

On 22 July 2021, the Allied Democratic Forces (ADF) ambushed a convoy of civilians returning from a market along a highway between Mayi-Moya and Chani-chani, Beni Territory, North Kivu, Democratic Republic of the Congo. Sixteen civilians were killed in the ambush, and nine more were injured.

== Background ==
Following the radicalization of its founding leader, Jamil Mukulu, the ADF was formed as a merger of several rebel groups (initially called ADF/NALU) in 1995. The ADF initially operated in western Uganda but has since, and currently continues to operate solely in the eastern DRC; this includes the North Kivu and Ituri Provinces.

The ADF's leadership shifted after the imprisonment of Mukulu on 30 April 2015. Musa Seka Baluku, Mukulu's second-in-command since the group's formation, stepped forward in his place shortly after. Under Baluku's leadership, the group made contact with the Islamic State (IS) as early as 2017, were formally recognized as a chapter of IS–Central Africa Province (IS-CAP) in 2018, and formally pledged their allegiance to the IS in 2019. By that year, the ADF had split, with one part remaining loyal to Mukulu and the other to Baluku. Since joining IS-CAP, the ADF increasingly targeted civilians into their attacks.

== Massacre ==
The massacre occurred along the road linking Mayi-Moya and Chani-chani in Beni Territory, and at the time of the attack a convoy of civilians were returning from the market. The ambush occurred in the town of Mayi-Moya (also spelled Maimoya), and began when the attackers launched an RPG that immobilized the vehicle. The director of the hospital in Oicha, where the victims were transferred, stated that all of the victims were shot by the perpetrators. Sixteen civilians were killed in the massacre, and nine others were wounded. All of the victims were residents of Oicha Territory.

Congolese officials attributed the attack to the Islamic State, although ISCAP did not release a statement claiming responsibility.
