= 2021–2024 Democratic Republic of the Congo attacks =

War in the Democratic Republic of the Congo

From 2021 to 2024, the Democratic Republic of Congo (DRC) continued to face significant conflict, particularly in the eastern regions of Ituri, North Kivu, and South Kivu.

Throughout the conflict, rebel troops have carried out raids and massacres across the DRC, resulting in heavy civilian casualties. In October 2021, the Allied Democratic Forces launched a bombing campaign in Uganda, leading to the intervention of the Ugandan military a year later, which has pursued a policy of airstrikes against ADF targets. In contrast, the Islamic State has reportedly lent support to the Allied Democratic Forces.

The government under Félix Tshisekedi has tried to combat the insurgency by declaring martial law, with mixed success.

== Humanitarian situation ==
The ongoing conflict in the country has led to thousands of deaths, millions displaced, food insecurity, and widespread human rights violations. UN convoys have been raided, leading to the murder of Italian ambassador Luca Attanasio, possibly by the FDLR. Many refugee camps for these displaced people have been raided by rebels, prompting condemnation from the United Nations.

According to reporters, the ADF has used civilians as human shields, which is a war crime under international law.

The UN has reported that about 7.3 million people were internally displaced by the end of 2024. The ongoing humanitarian crisis leaves approximately 25.4 million people in need of humanitarian aid in the whole country (as of 2024).

== Summary counts of fatalities, internally displaced people and attacks by year ==
Deaths of civilians per year:

2021. 2,252
2022. 3,076
2023. 2,502
2024. 2,241

Development of internally displaced people (2021, 2022, 2023, 2024):

2021. 5.5 million
2022. 5.7 million
2023. 6.7 to 7 million
2024. 7.3 million

Available summary of attack type: In 2021, 898 terrorist attacks were registered in the country, and the Islamic State claimed responsibility for more than 300 of those attacks. In 2022, 1,063 to 1,198 people were killed, 714 to 839 were abducted, and at least 174 were injured by members of the Islamic State.

From January to October 2021, 260 security incidents affecting humanitarian work were reported, resulting in seven humanitarian workers being killed, 26 injured, and 23 kidnapped. In 2022, 293 security incidents were recorded.

== List of attacks per year ==
=== 2021 ===
| Date | Dead | Injured | Involved | Location – Circumstances |
|---|---|---|---|---|
| 4 January | 22 | unknown | ADF | North Kivu, Beni territory, Mwenda – 22 people were killed when the ADF attack the village of Mwenda with machetes and guns. |
| 5 January | 4 | unknown | FPIC | Ituri Province, Baboa Bokoe chiefdom – Three civilians and one soldier were killed in a FPIC attack on three villages setting fire to multiple homes. |
| 10 January | 6 (+2) | 1 | Mai-Mai | North Kivu, Nyamitwitwi, Rutshuru – Six park rangers were killed and one injured when Mai-Mai attacked their positions. |
| 12 January | 3 (+2) | unknown | ADF | Ituri Province, Bahatsha – ADF ambushed a company of FARDC soldiers in the village of Bahatsha killing three and losing two of their own. |
| 13 January | 15 | unknown | ADF | Ituri Province, locality of Abembi – ADF attacked a village in the locality of Abembi killing 15 people. |
| 14 January | 46 | unknown | ADF | Ituri Province, Irumu territory – 46 people were killed when ADF militants attacked a village in the Irumu territory. |
| 18 January | 1 | 3 | Armed men | North Kivu, chiefdom of Bwito – Four civilians were kidnapped and one beheaded in the chiefdom of Bwito when unidentified armed men demanding US$3,000 for their release. |
| 26 January | 0 | 6 | Anti-balaka rebels | Nord-Ubangi Province, Mogóró cell – Anti-balaka rebels from the Central African Republic crossed over into the DRC and kidnapped six fishermen along the Ubangi river. |
| 5 February | 12 | unknown | ADF | North Kivu, Mabule – Twelve people were killed when ADF attacked the village of Mabule. |
| 7 February | 1 | 3 | Mai-Mai | North Kivu, Osso-Banyungu sector – Mai-Mai killed the official delegate of the governor of North Kivu, Mai-Mai also kidnapped a person at the scene. |
| 9 February | 10 | unknown | ADF | Ituri Province, Kithovirwa – ADF killed ten people in Kithovirwa village with knives. |
| 10 February | 2 | 1 | Bandits | Ituri Province, Linji – Two people were killed and another wounded when bandits attacked Linji village at 10 p.m. local time, stealing valuables. |
| 13 February | 1 | unknown | FPIC | Ituri Province, Kabarole – FPIC militiamen attacked the village of Kabarole at 3 p.m. local time killing a woman and stealing 60 cows. |
| 14 February | 5 (+6) | unknown | Bakata-Katanga | Haut-Katanga Province, Lubumbashi – Four police and one civilian were killed when the Bakata-Katanga militia attack Lubumbashi. Six attackers were also killed. |
| 14 February | 14 | unknown | ADF | Ituri Province, locality of Ndalya – Fourteen civilians were killed and a church burned when ADF attacked the locality of Ndalya at 10 a.m. local time. |
| 15 February | 10 | unknown | ADF | North Kivu, Kalembo – Ten civilians were killed and pharmacies and shops looted when ADF attacked the village of Kalembo. |
| 17 February | 4 | 2 | ADF | North Kivu, commune of Oicha – ADF attacked the commune of Oicha at 7:30 pm local time killing four and injuring two. |
| 18–19 February | 10(+6) | unknown | CODECO | Ituri Province, Mongwalu – CODECO militants from the URDPC branch attacked the city of Mongwalu killing ten people, burning 30 homes, and looting many others. CODECO lost six of their own soldier in the attack. |
| 19 February | 1 | 1 | ADF | North Kivu, Musuku – ADF ambushed a motorcycle in Musuku killing one and injuring one. |
| 22 February | 3 | 0 | FDLR (Suspected) | North Kivu, Virunga National Park – Luca Attanasio, the Italian ambassador to the Democratic Republic of the Congo, was assassinated along with two others by suspected FDLR gunmen while traveling through Virunga National Park. See also: Killing of Luca Attanasio |
| 22 February | 10 | unknown | ADF | Ituri Province, Kisima sector – ADF attacked a village at 6 p.m. local time killing ten people and setting a house on fire. |
| 22 February | 1(+1) | unknown | ADF | Ituri Province, commune of Oicha – ADF attacked the commune of Oicha at 11 p.m. local time killing one but losing one of their own in an FARDC counterattack. |
| 23 February | 11 | unknown | FPIC | Ituri Province, Mugangu – FPIC attacked the village of Mugangu killing 11 and burning 19 homes. |
| 23–24 February | 4 | 1 | CODECO | Ituri Province, Tchibi Tchibi, K25 Mongali and Kabakaba – CODECO killed three gold miners working at a quarry called "America" in the town of Kabakaba and one woman working in the field in the town of Tchibi Tchibi. |
| 25 February | 1 (+2) | Unknown | Mai-Mai | North Kivu, Makeke – Mai-Mai attacked FARDC positions in the village of Makeke. The attack was repelled with two militia men being killed and 12 being captured as well and one soldier being killed. |
| 25 February | 3 | 0 | ADF | Ituri Province, Kolimumu hill – ADF attacked near Kolimumu hill killing three and burning several houses. |
| 26 February | 3 | 0 | ADF | Ituri Province, Makisabo – ADF ambushed a Toyota Dyna in the village of Makisabo killing three civilians inside. |
| 28 February | 16 | Unknown | ADF | North Kivu, Boyo – An ADF attack near the town of Boyo killed 16. |
| 28 February | 2 (+2) | 2 | ADF | North Kivu, Kitimba – ADF attacked the village of Kitimba killing two, injuring two, and burning five houses, two ADF fighters were killed in an army response. |
| 28 February | 7 | 3 | ADF | Ituri Province, locality of Bwakadi – ADF attacked the localities of Bwakadi village and Banande-Kainama region looting them, burning ten homes, killing 7 civilians and injuring 3. |
| 1 March | 3 (+16) | Unknown | FPIC | Ituri Province, Babelebe chiefdom – The FPIC attacked Kunda, Mwanga, Babunya and Magalabo villages stealing valuable and setting fire to 20 homes, the military responded killing 16 militiamen while losing three soldiers. |
| 2 March | 14 (+2) | Unknown | ADF | Ituri Province, Mambelenga – ADF attacked a market in the town of Mambelenga killing 14 and leaving two of their own fighters dead. |
| 4 March | 1 | 4 | Mai-Mai | North Kivu, Makumo – ten Mai-Mai Simba soldiers led by war lord Morgan attacked the village of Makumo killing one soldier and wounding four civilians. |
| 8 March | 8 | Unknown | ADF | Ituri Province, Appende village – An ADF attacked the village of Appende burning 10 homes and killing eight. |
| 8 March | 4 | 7 | Mayi-Mayi | Tanganyika Province, Kasange – Mayi-Mayi Malaika attacked the town of Kasange looting it then attacked FARDC positions in the town killing four and wounding seven. |
| 10 March | 3 | Unknown | ADF | Haut-Uele District, Matombo village – An ADF attack on the town of Matombo kills three. |
| 13 March | 0 | 20+ | ADF | Ituri Province, Mutweyi village – ADF attacked the village of Mutweyi taking at least 20 hostages. |
| 15 March | 17 | Unknown | ADF | North Kivu, Bulongo city – An ADF attack on Bulongo city kills 17. |
| 15 March | 16 | 40 | CODECO | Ituri Province, Garua – CODECO attacked the village of Garua in retaliation for the murder of a youth by tribal militia the day before. The CODECO attack continued throughout the area and ultimately left 16 killed and 40 injured. |
| 19 March | 11 | unknown | ADF | Ituri Province, Hotel-Bega/Mayalibo – ADF attacked the village of Hotel-Bega/Mayalibo killing eleven people. |
| 21 March | 5 | 14 | CODECO | Ituri Province, DII – CODECO launched an assault on the town of DII triggering a battle between FARDC and CODECO, the battle left Five civilian dead and six seriously injured, CODECO also took eight hostages, after the battle was over a riot was started with rioters burning tires and a car belonging to the United Nations. |
| 22 March | 10 | Unknown | ADF | North Kivu, Samboko-Chanichani – An ADF attack on Samboko-Chanichani kills 10. |
| 25 March | 0 | 20 | Mai-Mai | Kalonge village, Lubero territory – A Mai-Mai headed by general Kabido abducted 20 people from Kalonge village. |
| 28 March | 2 (+1) | 0 | Mayi-Mayi | North Kivu, Kangote barrier – Mayi-Mayi militiamen attacked Kangote barrier checkpoint killing a soldier and police officer and losing one of their own in the clash. |
| 29 March | 5 | Unknown | ADF | North Kivu, Samboko-Chanichani – Five people were killed with machetes in the town of Samboko-Chanichani by the ADF. |
| 30 March | 4 (+3) | Unknown | ADF | Ituri Province, Molisomambandada – ADF attacked the village of Molisomambandada killing four civilians before attacking army positions losing three in the clash with the army. |
| 30–31 March | 29 (+2) | 50 | ADF | North Kivu, Moliso – ADF militants attacked the town of Moliso and stormed 2101st Congolese army regiment base, killing 29 civilians and kidnapping 50 others. |
| 31 March | unknown | Unknown | Mai-Mai | Katimba, Maniema province – A battle between two Mai-Mai militia groups left 200 house burned and valuable looted. |
| 1–2 April | 4 | Unknown | Mai-Mai | Bahaya grouping, Maniema province – Four people were killed and 250 houses burned when Mai-Mai Pygmies led by Mundus attacked six villages, |
| 4 April | 2 (+5) | 0 | Raia Mutomboki | South Kivu, Kalonge and Katasomwa – Raia Mutomboki militia attacked positions of the army in Kalonge and Katasomwa localities killing two soldiers but losing five of their own in the process. |
| 4 April | 0 | 20 | ADF | Ituri Province, Mungwanga – ADF attacked the village of Mungwanga kidnapping 20 people and stealing cassava flour, corn, goats, and chickens. |
| 5 April | 2 (+1) | 1 | Bazungu, APCLS | North Kivu, Mpati and Kishovu – Nyatura militiamen from the Bazungu and APCLS group attacked positions of the FARDC in Mpati killing one civilians, kidnaping one soldiers, and stealing weapons. APCLS-Nyatura lost one soldier in the attack. In Kishovu, Nyatura Bazungu attacked a police station killing one police officer and stealing two weapons. |
| 6 April | 5 | Unknown | CODECO | Ituri Province, Djugu territory, Katsu – Five people were killed by CODECO in the village of Katsu. |
| 7 April | 0 | 15 | Militiamen | Artisanal gold mine, Tanganyika province – Fifteen miners were kidnapped by eight militiamen. |
| 9 April | 2 | 1 | ADF | North Kivu, Makisabo and Kilya – The ADF attacked the villages of Makisabo and Kilya killed two, injured one more, and set fire to two vehicles. |
| 10 April | 9 | 20 | CODECO | Ituri Province, Djugu territory – CODECO militiamen attacked the villages of Jiba, Tsoro, Lopaz and Nyeniza. In Jiba CODECO killed three soldiers and three civilians. In Tsoro CODECO set fire to a vehicle belonging to the NGO MEMISA. In Lopa CODECO killed three civilians, burned three vehicles, and stole two other vehicles. In Nyeniza CODECO took 10 people as hostages. |
| 16 April | 13 | Unknown | | Bakwakenge, Kasai Province – Ethnic violence between the Luba and Kuba ethnic groups in the town of Bakwakenge felt 13 dead and 190 homes burned. |
| 16 April | 4 | Unknown | | South Kivu, Bushushu – A land dispute escalated into conflict leaving four people dead and 22 houses destroyed. |
| 16 April | 3 | Unknown | CODECO | Ituri Province, Fataki – Three people were killed and more than a hundred houses burned when CODECO attacked Fataki. |
| 18 April | 4 | Unknown | FPIC | Ituri Province, Nyakunde center – Three civilians and one soldier were killed when FPIC attack the Nyakunde center capturing the village and setting fire to four cars. |
| 21 April | 2 | unknown | Armed men | Lubigi, South Kivu – One civilian and one soldier unidentified armed men attacked gold trading center, the armed men stole large amount of cash and gold. |
| 21 April | 1 | unknown | Gumino / Twirwaneho | Malera, South Kivu – One civilian was killed, seven cows were stolen, and several houses were burned in an attack by Gumino / Twigwaneho militia on the village of Malera. |
| 23 April | 8 | 20 | ADF | Ituri Province, Aveyi – Eight people were killed and 20 people taken as people as hostages in an ADF attack on the village of Aveyi. |
| 24 April | 3 | unknown | FPIC | Ituri Province, Bunia – Two soldiers and one civilian were killed in an FPIC attack near Bunia. |
| 25 April | 5 | unknown | ADF | Mantumbi, North Kivu – Five people were killed in an ADF attack on the locality of Mantumbi. |
| 25 April | 6 | unknown | Armed men | Shonga, North Kivu – Unknown armed men attacked the village of Shonga killing six. |
| 8 May | 2(+1) | unknown | ADF | Ituri Province, Lukaya – An ADF attack on an army position in the town of Lukaya left two civilians and one ADF member dead. |
| 9 May | 21 | unknown | | Nyunzu territory, Tanganika province – An ambush on a motorcycle left three people dead in Kanani. A militia attack on the village of Kasoso left 18 people dead. |
| 10 May | 5 | 0 | ADF | North Kivu, Kilia – An ADF attack on the village of Kilia and the UN base there killing five inducing a UN peacekeeper from Malawi. |
| 11–16 May | 21 | 52 | ADF | Ituri Province, Mambasa territory – A series of ADF attacks in Mambasa territory left 21 people dead and 52 people taken hostage. |
| 13 May | 3(+1) | 0 | Soldier | Kamango neighborhoods, North Kivu – A Congolese soldier killed three members of his family before committing suicide. |
| 18 May | 1 | 0 | ADF | Beni, North Kivu – Suspected ADF assassinated an imam while he was returning home. |
| 27 May | 26 | unknown | Islamist militants (Suspected) | Beni, North Kivu – Suspected Islamist militants attacked villages in an overnight raid. |
| 27 May | 3 | 0 | ADF | Kasindi, North Kivu – The ADF attacked truck carrying cocoa, setting it on fire and killing three people. |
| 27 May | 5 | 0 | ADF | North Kivu – The ADF burned five people alive in their homes. |
| 29 May | 6 | 0 | ADF | Kinyatsi, North Kivu – The ADF burned six people alive in their house in Kinyatsi. |
| 30–31 May | 60+ | Many | ADF (Suspected) | Ituri Province, Boga and Tchabi – A massacre committed by an unknown group of militants, likely ADF killed at least 60 people. The militants attacked the town of Boga killing at least 36 people then attacked the town of Tchabi killing at least 24. |
| 4 June | 2 | 0 | ADF | Ntoma-Halungupa road, North Kivu – ADF militants ambushed a motorcycle carrying a soldier and a civilian killing both of them. |
| 8 June | 8 (+22) | 1+ | Unknown group | Ituri Province, Kinyanjojo and Boga-center – An Unknown armed group attacked Kinyanjojo and Boga-center looting shops and setting fire to General Reference Hospital. The Army managed to push the attackers back inflicting 22 casualties but not after they killed eight civilian. One soldiers was injured and one AK-47 was recovered from the retreating attackers. |
| 24 June | 0 | 25 | Patriots Front for Peace | Luhanga, North Kivu – 25 people were taken hostage by the Patriots Front for Peace, a group run by warlord Kabido. |
| 26 June | 5 | 0 | ADF | Ituri Province, Tokotoko – Five hostages taken by the ADF were killed in the village of Tokotoko. |
| 27 June | 1 | 3 | | Beni, North Kivu – A bombing a Malumalu roundabout kills one and injures three. |
| 27 June | 0 | 2 | | Beni, North Kivu – A bombing targeting a Catholic church injured two and blew out the windows in the church. |
| 2 July | 13 | unknown | CODECO | Ituri Province, Djugu territory – CODECO attacked several villages in Djugu territory killing 13 and setting fire to several homes. |
| 11 July | 3 | unknown | CODECO | Ituri Province, Thali village – CODECO ambushed a group of people killing three and stealing valuables. |
| 12 July | 18 | unknown | ADF | Ituri Province, Walese Vonkutu chiefdom – The ADF attacked several villages in the chiefdom of Walese Vonkutu killing 18 people. |
| 13 July | 3 | unknown | Mayi-Mayi | Musangwa, North kivu – Three people were killed when Mayi-Mayi fighters attack the village of Musangwa. |
| 14 July | 1 | 1 | Ituri Patriotic Resistance Force | Ituri Province, Batumbi – An anti-personal mine laid by the Ituri Patriotic Resistance Force killed a man and injured another. |
| 15 July | 4 | 2 | Unknown group | Ituri Province, Tinda Bridge – Four people were killed and two injured near Tinda Bridge when an unknown group opened fire on a car. |
| 15 July | 2 | 0 | ADF | Beni, North Kivu – The ADF killed two civil society members in Beni. |
| 15 July | 3 | 0 | FPIC | Ituri Province, Rujumba village – A FPIC attack on the village of Rujumba killed three people. |
| 16 July | 4 | 0 | ADF | Liva village, North Kivu – An ADF attack on farmer in the village of Liva killed four. |
| 2 August | 16 | | ADF | Ituri Province, Idohu – An ADF attack on civilians. Congolese soldiers were present during the massacre but failed to respond to the attack. |
| 27 August | 19 | | ADF (Suspected) | Beni territory, Kalanguta – An attack possibly committed by the ADF. Several people were kidnapped. |
| 3 September | 30 | | ADF | Ituri Province, Makutano – ADF machete attack on a village north of Oicha. |
| 21 November | 44 | | ADF | Ituri Province, Drodro refugee camp – An ADF massacre against a refugee camp in Ituri. The exact amount of casualties remains unclear. |
| 25 December | 7 | 13 | ADF | In Box restaurant, Beni – An ADF suicide bomber kills seven. |

=== 2022 ===
| Date | Dead | Injured | Involved | Location – Circumstances |
|---|---|---|---|---|
| January 5 | 3 | | ADF | North Kivu, Nzenkeka, Beni Takemata – An attack on civilians kills three civilians, including one woman. |
| February 2 | 60+ | | CODECO | Ituri Province, Djugu territory, Plaine Savo – Militiamen murdered over 60 civilians at an IDP camp in the Plaine Savo massacre. |
| March 28 | None | | M23 | Ituri Province, Goma – Rebels attack Congolese military bases |
| March 29 | 8 | | M23 or Congolese soldiers | Tshanzu, Kivu – A helicopter carrying Pakistani, Russian, and Serbian soldiers crashes. Both M23 and Congolese soldiers accuse the other side. |
| April 3 | 21 | | ADF | North Kivu, Masambo, Beni territory – An attack on the village kills dozens. |
| April 5 | 1 | | Militia | Ituri Province, Djugu territory – Unknown militiamen kill one Nepalese UN peacekeeper. |
| May 8 | 35 | | CODECO | Ituri Province – Rebels attack a gold mine. |
| May 10 | 14 | | CODECO | Ituri Province, Fataki – Militants attack people at a refugee camp |
| May 30 | 15 | | ADF (Suspected) | North Kivu – Suspected ADF attack. |
| June 6 | 12 | | CODECO (Suspected) | Ituri Province – Suspected CODECO militants attack a village. |
| July 26 | 15 | | UN peacekeepers | North Kivu, Goma – UN peacekeepers fire on civilians protesting the UN's involvement in the Congo. |
| August 5–7 | 15–20 | | ADF | Ituri Province, Kandoyi and Bandiboli See also: Kandoyi and Bandiboli attacks |

=== 2023 ===
| Date | Dead | Injured | Involved | Location – Circumstances |
|---|---|---|---|---|
| January 14–15 | 49 | | CODECO (Suspected) | Ituri Province, Nyamamba, Mbogi – Forty-two villagers, including 12 women and six children, were killed in the village of Nyamamba. Seven men were killed in the village of Mbogi. See also: Nyamamba and Mbogi mass graves |
| January 19 | 7 | | CODECO | Ituri Province, Djugu territory, Plaine Savo refugee camp – Five children and two adults were killed. |
| June 12 | 45 | 7 | Undisclosed | Ituri Province – The Lala displacement camp was attacked by militants, resulting in the deaths of both adults and children. They also set fire to over 800 shelters. |
| November 14 | 29 | | Undisclosed | North Kivu, Beni – The attack killed 29 people, including 8 children. |
| November 14 | 14 | | ADF | North Kivu, Mamove village – A farming community was attacked, 14 were beheaded and others were missing. Houses were burned down. |

=== 2024 ===
| Date | Dead | Injured | Involved | Location – Circumstances |
|---|---|---|---|---|
| January 25 | 19 | 25 | FARDC | North Kivu – A house in the Bukama neighbourhood of Mweso was struck by an artillery round, killing adults and 15 children. |
| February 19-20 | 24 | | AFD | North Kivu, Beni Territory and Ituri Province, Mambasa Territory See also: 2024 East Congo attacks |
| March 4 | 17 | 12 | M23 (Suspected) | North Kivu, Nyanzale – A column of civilians running from an M23 assault on Nyanzale town was hit. At least 17 were killed and a dozen more were injured. |
| May 3 | 18 | 30 | M23 (Suspected) | North Kivu, near Goma – One of several rockets hit an IDP camp (8ème CEPAC Mugunga) killing adults and 15 children. |
| May 7 | 7 | 6 | M23 | South Kivu – A bombing in a village killed seven and injured six. |
| May 9 | 8 | | ADF | North Kivu – An attack on a health center killed patients and an accountant. |
| June 5 | 16 | 8 | ADF (Suspected) | North Kivu, Beni – The attack on a food convoy took place on a road between the towns of Chanichani and Mayi-Moya. Most of the victims were farmers and traders. |
| June 7 | 41 | | ADF (Suspected) | North Kivu, Masala, Mapasana, and Mahini – Suspected Allied Democratic Forces (ADF) attack. |
| July 3 | 6 | | CODECO | Ituri Province, Gambala, Camp Blanquette gold mine – Six Chinese miners and two Congolese soldiers were killed in an attack on a gold mine. Two miners were kidnapped. |
| August | 12+ | | ADF | North Kivu, several villages (including Mukonia) – Several villages were attacked. |
| December | 13 | | ADF | North Kivu, Mabisio – 13 people were killed, an unknown number of people were kidnapped and houses looted and set on fire. |
| December 3 | 10 | | ADF | North Kivu, Beni, Batangi-Mbau area, PK20 – 10 people were killed, an unknown number of people were kidnapped and 5 houses were set on fire. |

== See also ==
- 2020 Democratic Republic of the Congo attacks
- 2021 in the Democratic Republic of the Congo
- 2025 Democratic Republic of the Congo attacks
- List of terrorist incidents in 2025
- List of massacres in the Democratic Republic of the Congo
- Attacks on humanitarian workers
