= Mununzi =

- Village
- Location within Democratic Republic of the Congo
- Coordinates: 0.595°N 29.241°E
- Country: Democratic Republic of the Congo
- Province: North Kivu
- Territory: Beni Territory
- Time zone: UTC+2 (CAT)

Mununzi is a village in North Kivu in eastern Democratic Republic of the Congo. It is connected by road to Matango in the east.
