= Otomabere massacre =

2022 attack in Bwanasura, Democratic Republic of the Congo

Otomabere attack
- Part of Allied Democratic Forces insurgency, Kivu conflict
- Location: Bwanasura, Otomabere, Irumu Territory, Nord-Kivu, Democratic Republic of the Congo
- Date: June 5, 2022
- Deaths: 36 (per Red Cross)
- Perpetrators: ISCAP (alleged by locals and Congolese government)

On the night on June 5, 2022, militants from the Islamic State – Central Africa Province (ISCAP) attacked the village of Bwanasura, in Otomabere, North Kivu, in the Democratic Republic of the Congo. The attack killed over twenty civilians, marking one of the deadliest attacks by ISCAP in 2022.

== Background ==
Following the radicalization of its founding leader, Jamil Mukulu, the ADF was formed as a merger of several rebel groups (initially called ADF/NALU) in 1995. The ADF initially operated in western Uganda but has since, and currently continues to operate solely in the eastern DRC; this includes the North Kivu and Ituri Provinces.

The ADF's leadership shifted after the imprisonment of Mukulu on 30 April 2015. Musa Seka Baluku, Mukulu's second-in-command since the group's formation, stepped forward in his place shortly after. Under Baluku's leadership, the group made contact with the Islamic State (IS) as early as 2017, were formally recognized as a chapter of IS–Central Africa Province (IS-CAP) in 2018, and formally pledged their allegiance to the IS in 2019. By that year, the ADF had split, with one part remaining loyal to Mukulu and the other to Baluku; the latter renewed their allegiance to the IS in April 2022. Since joining IS-CAP, the ADF increasingly targeted civilians into their attacks.

In response to growing causalities at the hands of the ADF, the Congolese and Ugandan armed forces created a joint military force called Operation Shujaa in November 2021. The Operation's already mixed perception, due to views of Uganda's role in the Second Congo War, was further put into question regarding its effectiveness in actually preventing ADF attacks.

Attacks in the weeks prior to the ones in Otomabere amounted to at least 43 civilians killed.

== Attack ==
The attack began on the night of June 5, 2022, in the village of Bwanasura near Otomabere. ISCAP militants arrived at around 8 pm local time, "operating quietly" according to the local head of the Red Cross. Local survivors stated that ISCAP fired gunshots, causing everyone to flee the area. In the attack, ISCAP fighters burned down at least 30 houses. Thirteen civilian motorcycles were destroyed in the attack. At some point in the night, the ISCAP fighters fled.

== Aftermath ==
The initial death toll after the attacks was eighteen, following the return of residents counting the bodies the next morning. Many of the dead were stabbed or shot to death. Later that day, the head of the local group Convention for the Respect of Human Rights stated the provisional death toll was 20.

The Red Cross stated that 36 bodies were found in the forests near Bwanasura in the following days. An official in Irumu territory stated that the victims were from several villages around Otomabere, including three from Mayimoya, four from Eringeti, and an unknown number of others from Oicha, the capital of Beni Territory.

In response to the attack, the Congolese army claimed they were "in pursuit of the assailants."
