= Lisasa massacre =

Terrorist incident in Democratic Republic of the Congo

- Part of the Kivu conflict and the ADF insurgency
- Lisasa (Democratic Republic of the Congo) Location of Lisasa within the North Kivu Province, Democratic Republic of the Congo
- Native name: Massacre de Lisasa, Mauaji ya Lisasa
- Location: 0°18′24″N 29°24′58″E; Lisasa, Kitsimba, and Kamwiri, North Kivu Province, Democratic Republic of the Congo
- Date: 31 October 2020; 08:00 p.m.–12:00 a.m. CAT (UTC+02:00)
- Attack type: Mass murder and massacre
- Deaths: 21+ civilians
- Victims: 20 civilians kidnapped
- Perpetrators: Islamic State; IS-CAP; ADF-Baluku
- Motive: Slaughter of Christians

The Lisasa massacre (French: Massacre de Lisasa, Swahili: Mauaji ya Lisasa) occurred on 31 October 2020, when Islamic State-affiliated (IS) Allied Democratic Forces (ADF-Baluku) rebels attacked the village of Lisasa, Beni Territory in northern North Kivu Province, Democratic Republic of the Congo (DRC). After clashes with the Union of Patriots for the Liberation of the Congo (UPLC), a group belonging to the Mai-Mai—ADF militants killed over 21 civilians. The attack and massacre occurred between 8:00 p.m. and 12:00 a.m. CAT. Subsequent massacres killing an unknown number of civilians were carried out in the nearby towns of Kitsimba and Kamwiri, The attack occurred days before the ADF slaughtered 19 civilians in the village of Baeti.

== Background ==
Following the radicalization of its founding leader, Jamil Mukulu, the ADF was formed as a merger of several rebel groups (initially called ADF/NALU) in 1995. The ADF initially operated in western Uganda but has since, and currently continues to operate solely in the eastern DRC; this includes the North Kivu and Ituri Provinces.

The ADF's leadership shifted after the imprisonment of Mukulu on 30 April 2015. Musa Seka Baluku, Mukulu's second-in-command since the group's formation, stepped forward in his place shortly after. Under Baluku's leadership, the group made contact with the Islamic State (IS) as early as 2017, were formally recognized as a chapter of IS–Central Africa Province (IS-CAP) in 2018, and formally pledged their allegiance to the IS in 2019. By that year, the ADF had split, with one part remaining loyal to Mukulu and the other to Baluku. Since joining IS-CAP, the ADF increasingly targeted civilians into their attacks.

The campaign also heavily targeted Christian villages, and the ADF perpetrated numerous massacres. In Beni in October 2020, ADF fighters broke hundreds of their compatriots out of a jail near the town. The jailbreak encouraged ADF fighters to continue their rampage in areas of Beni Territory that hadn't seen massacres for four years. In the town of Baeti on October 28, ADF fighters massacred nineteen people. The Lisasa massacre occurred a year and one day after the start of a counter-insurgency campaign by the Congolese government against the ADF.

== Massacre ==
Prior to the massacre, the village was defended by militiamen of the Mai-Mai group UPLC. ISCAP jihadists attacked the village of Lisasa at one in the morning of October 31, with some fighters engaging in clashes with UPLC and armed civilians and other fighters ransacking the village, looting houses and killing civilians. The jihadists attacked the village's health center and set fire to it, and then desecrated a Catholic church in the village. Massacres were also carried out in the neighboring villages of Kitsimba and Kamwiri.

The preliminary death toll was seventeen civilians killed across all three villages, fifteen of the dead being women. Twenty people were also kidnapped. Four bodies were found the next day, bringing the death toll to twenty-one killed. Some of the kidnapped residents were health workers at the hospital in Lisasa.

== Aftermath ==
The Congolese government did not release a statement in the immediate aftermath of the massacre. Josep Borrell condemned the attack on November 1. That same day, ISCAP claimed responsibility for the massacre in Lisasa, along with the prison break in Kangbayi. In the statement by ISCAP, they stated the motive of attacking Lisasa was to kill Christians.
