= Mwenda massacre =

2021 massacre in the DRC

- Part of Allied Democratic Forces insurgency of the Kivu conflict
- Location: Mwenda, Beni Territory, North Kivu, Democratic Republic of the Congo
- Date: January 4, 2021; 7 p.m.
- Weapons: Machetes and guns
- Deaths: 23
- Injuries: 10
- Victim: Unknown number of civilians kidnapped
- Perpetrator: ISCAP

On January 4, 2021, jihadists from the Islamic State - Central Africa Province (ISCAP) attacked the village of Mwenda, North Kivu, Democratic Republic of the Congo, killing 23 people. The massacre came several days after an attack on Tingwe that killed over 30 people.

== Background ==
Following the radicalization of its founding leader, Jamil Mukulu, the ADF was formed as a merger of several rebel groups (initially called ADF/NALU) in 1995. The ADF initially operated in western Uganda but has since, and currently continues to operate solely in the eastern DRC; this includes the North Kivu and Ituri Provinces.

The ADF's leadership shifted after the imprisonment of Mukulu on 30 April 2015. Musa Seka Baluku, Mukulu's second-in-command since the group's formation, stepped forward in his place shortly after. Under Baluku's leadership, the group made contact with the Islamic State (IS) as early as 2017, were formally recognized as a chapter of IS–Central Africa Province (IS-CAP) in 2018, and formally pledged their allegiance to the IS in 2019. By that year, the ADF had split, with one part remaining loyal to Mukulu and the other to Baluku. Since joining IS-CAP, the ADF increasingly targeted civilians into their attacks.

Less than a week prior, on 31 December 2020, ADF militants massacred civilians in Tingwe, also in Beni Territory. Thirty people were killed in the attack at Tingwe.

== Massacre ==
ADF militants attacked Mwenda at 7 p.m. on January 4, and went door-to-door bludgeoning residents to death with machetes and shooting them as well. Civilian homes were looted and ransacked by the jihadists, and several others were kidnapped. At the same time as the attack on Mwenda, ISCAP fighters killed nine people in a nearby village. Twenty-two people were initially killed in the massacre at Mwenda, and ten others were injured. Of the 22 killed, ten were women. The death toll rose to 23 by January 15.

The Congolese Army entered Mwenda after the massacre, and ISCAP militants fled but remained near the town.

== Aftermath ==
The massacre at Mwenda was the second in a string of ISCAP attacks since the start of 2021. Two days after the attack on Mwenda, thirty civilians were killed in the nearby village of Loselose. On January 12, ISCAP jihadists ambushed Congolese forces in Mwenda, sparking a battle that left one soldier killed and three others injured. ISCAP was ultimately repelled from the village. Four people were killed in another attack by ISCAP on January 15 in Mwenda.

On January 7, UN Secretary General António Guterres condemned the massacres at Tingwe, Mwenda, and Loselose.
