= January 2020 Oicha massacres =

Massacre in the DR Congo by the Islamic State

- Part of Kivu conflict and Allied Democratic Forces insurgency
- Location: Mamove, Mantumbi, Manzingi, and other towns west of Oicha, Democratic Republic of the Congo
- Date: January 28–30, 2020
- Deaths: 73+
- Perpetrator: ISCAP

Between January 28 and 30, 2020, the Islamic State – Central Africa Province (ISCAP) killed at least seventy-three people in a series of massacres in Oicha Territory, Democratic Republic of the Congo. The attacks spanned across several towns, especially Mantumbi, Manzingi, and Mamove.

== Background ==
Following the radicalization of its founding leader, Jamil Mukulu, the ADF was formed as a merger of several rebel groups (initially called ADF/NALU) in 1995. The ADF initially operated in western Uganda but has since, and currently continues to operate solely in the eastern DRC; this includes the North Kivu and Ituri Provinces.

The ADF's leadership shifted after the imprisonment of Mukulu on 30 April 2015. Musa Seka Baluku, Mukulu's second-in-command since the group's formation, stepped forward in his place shortly after. Under Baluku's leadership, the group made contact with the Islamic State (IS) as early as 2017, were formally recognized as a chapter of IS–Central Africa Province (IS-CAP) in 2018, and formally pledged their allegiance to the IS in 2019. By that year, the ADF had split, with one part remaining loyal to Mukulu and the other to Baluku. Since joining IS-CAP, the ADF increasingly targeted civilians into their attacks.

== Prelude ==
The Allied Democratic Forces, a Ugandan jihadist group based in the DRC's North Kivu region, pledged allegiance to the Islamic State in 2017 following a shortage of funds. The group renamed to the Islamic State – Central Africa Province (ISCAP), and began killings of civilians across North Kivu. The Ugandan and Congolese militaries launched an operation in 2019 to expel ISCAP from the areas, with some success. On December 29, 2019, ISCAP killed eighteen people in the town of Apetina-Sana in North Kivu.

== Massacre ==
The first attacks began in Manzingi and Eringeti on January 28, when ISCAP fighters killed fifteen people and injured six others.

Further attacks began in Mayimoya on January 29, along the road. People fled the town as the ISCAP fighters pushed into it. They then rampaged through Mamove around 3pm on January 30, killing six civilians, and burning houses and motorcycles. The towns of Aveli, Mantumbi, and Mulolya were attacked as well. In Mantumbi, fourteen people were killed by the jihadists, and a taxi driver was killed in Aveli. Three people were killed in Mulolya.

Ten more bodies were found in Mantumbi on January 31, bringing the town's death toll to twenty-three. Most of the victims were hacked to death by machete, the modus operandi of ISCAP.

== Aftermath ==
The death toll of the attacks, which spanned forty-eight hours, was seventy-three. The Beni Civil Society sounded the alarm of a high number of ISCAP operatives in Mamove and Mantumbi following the attacks.

Seven people were killed in a second attack by Mai-Mai militiamen in Mamove on January 31.

== Videography ==
- RDC: de nouveaux massacres attribués aux ADF dans l'est du pays - Le Journal Afrique TV5MONDE via Twitter
