= Kirindera massacre =

Terrorist incident in Democratic Republic of the Congo

- Part of Allied Democratic Forces insurgency and Kivu conflict
- Location: Kirindera, Beni Territory, North Kivu, Democratic Republic of the Congo
- Date: March 12, 2023; 1:00 am
- Deaths: 19
- Injuries: Unknown
- Perpetrator: ISCAP

On March 12, 2023, jihadists from the Islamic State - Central Africa Province (ISCAP) attacked the village of Kirindera, Beni Territory, North Kivu, Democratic Republic of the Congo, killing nineteen civilians. The massacre occurred days after the Mukondi massacre, where ISCAP killed around forty civilians,

== Background ==
Following the radicalization of its founding leader, Jamil Mukulu, the ADF was formed as a merger of several rebel groups (initially called ADF/NALU) in 1995. The ADF initially operated in western Uganda but has since, and currently continues to operate solely in the eastern DRC; this includes the North Kivu and Ituri Provinces.

The ADF's leadership shifted after the imprisonment of Mukulu on 30 April 2015. Musa Seka Baluku, Mukulu's second-in-command since the group's formation, stepped forward in his place shortly after. Under Baluku's leadership, the group made contact with the Islamic State (IS) as early as 2017, were formally recognized as a chapter of IS–Central Africa Province (IS-CAP) in 2018, and formally pledged their allegiance to the IS in 2019. By that year, the ADF had split, with one part remaining loyal to Mukulu and the other to Baluku; the latter renewed their allegiance to the IS in April 2022. Since joining IS-CAP, the ADF increasingly targeted civilians into their attacks.

In response to growing causalities at the hands of the ADF, the Congolese and Ugandan armed forces created a joint military force called Operation Shujaa in November 2021. The Operation's already mixed perception, due to views of Uganda's role in the Second Congo War, was further put into question regarding its effectiveness in actually preventing ADF attacks.

The Kirindera massacre came as part of a larger campaign by ISCAP in early 2023 to attack civilians in Beni Territory. Days before the massacre, around forty civilians were killed in the Mukondi massacre.

== Massacre ==
The massacre began at 1:00 am local time on March 12, 2023. In the attack, the jihadists first targeted a health center where they killed two people before moving onto the reception center of a motel where civilians were hiding. Eleven civilians were killed in the motel. In the valley where they jihadists entered the village from, two more people were killed. The health center, hotel, and many civilian homes and five cars were also burnt by the jihadists. Congolese officials stated that nineteen people were killed in the massacre, and an unknown number more were kidnapped by ISCAP.

The mayor of Kirindera, Joachim Vyaghulua, stated that he coordinated a FARDC intervention during the massacre.
