= Bulongo massacre =

Terrorist incident in Democratic Republic of the Congo

- Part of the Kivu conflict and the ADF insurgency
- Bulongo (Democratic Republic of the Congo) Location of Bulongo within the North Kivu province, Democratic Republic of the Congo
- Native name: Massacre de Bulongo, Mauaji ya Bulongo
- Location: 0°19′53.44″N 29°40′34.82″E; Bulongo, Beni Territory, North Kivu, Democratic Republic of the Congo
- Date: 15 March 2021; ~12:00–02:00 a.m. CAT (UTC+02:00)
- Attack type: Mass murder and massacre
- Weapons: Machetes and pickaxes
- Deaths: 15+ civilians (in massacre); 1 civilian (in protests)
- Perpetrators: Islamic State; IS-CAP; ADF-Baluku

The Bulongo massacre (French: Massacre de Bulongo, Swahili: Mauaji ya Bulongo) occurred on 15 March 2021, when Islamic State-affiliated (IS) Allied Democratic Forces (ADF-Baluku) rebels attacked attacked the town of Bulongo, Beni Territory in northeastern North Kivu, Democratic Republic of the Congo, killing 15 people. The attack occurred in the middle of the night, between approximately 12:00 and 2:00 a.m. CAT. Upwards of 15 Congolese civilians were killed.

== Background ==
Following the radicalization of its founding leader, Jamil Mukulu, the ADF was formed as a merger of several rebel groups (initially called ADF/NALU) in 1995. The ADF initially operated in western Uganda but has since, and currently continues to operate solely in the eastern DRC; this includes the North Kivu and Ituri Provinces.

The ADF's leadership shifted after the imprisonment of Mukulu on 30 April 2015. Musa Seka Baluku, Mukulu's second-in-command since the group's formation, stepped forward in his place shortly after. Under Baluku's leadership, the group made contact with the Islamic State (IS) as early as 2017, were formally recognized as a chapter of IS–Central Africa Province (IS-CAP) in 2018, and formally pledged their allegiance to the IS in 2019. By that year, the ADF had split, with one part remaining loyal to Mukulu and the other to Baluku. Since joining IS-CAP, the ADF increasingly targeted civilians into their attacks.

The town of Bulongo itself had been attacked several times by the ADF, killing over 70 people and kidnapping 40. In 2021, the group began slaughtering everyone above the age of 15.

== Massacre ==
The massacre began between 12:00 and 2:00 a.m. in the Mutilipi district of the city, shortly after which the United Nations Organization Stabilization Mission in the DRC (MONUSCO) stated it had sent reinforcements to the area to stop the massacre. ADF rebels attacked Bulongo with machetes and pickaxes, reportedly slaughtering everyone they saw.

Many of the slain civilians were beheaded and their bodies were gutted. It was initially confirmed that 12 civilians were killed in the attack. The death toll would later account for at least 15 civilians having been killed.

== Reactions and response ==
The following day, locals and survivors protested against Congolese forces and MONUSCO for not preventing the attack, particularly blaming their delayed response time. Police opened fire to disperse the crowd, during which one protester was killed and another seriously injured by bullets.

=== Responsibility ===
The Defense Post said the Kivu Security Tracker (KST) group had initially suspected the ADF of being responsible, with local sources also blaming the ADF. Africanews and Jamestown's Terrorism Monitor later confirmed that the attack was perpetrated by the ADF, furthermore corroborated by the IS later claiming responsibility itself.
