= Mukondi massacre =

2023 mass murder in the DRC

- Part of Kivu conflict
- Location: Mukondi, North Kivu, Democratic Republic of the Congo
- Date: March 8–9, 2023
- Deaths: 39+ 36 (per regional governor); 44 (per local groups)
- Injuries: 17+ civilians
- Perpetrators: ISIL: IS-CAP; ADF-Baluku

During 8–9 March 2023, the Allied Democratic Forces (ADF) carried out a massacre in the village of Mukondi in North Kivu in the Democratic Republic of the Congo.

== Background ==
Following the radicalization of its founding leader, Jamil Mukulu, the ADF was formed as a merger of several rebel groups (initially called ADF/NALU) in 1995. The ADF initially operated in western Uganda but has since, and currently continues to operate solely in the eastern DRC; this includes the North Kivu and Ituri Provinces.

The ADF's leadership shifted after the imprisonment of Mukulu on 30 April 2015. Musa Seka Baluku, Mukulu's second-in-command since the group's formation, stepped forward in his place shortly after. Under Baluku's leadership, the group made contact with the Islamic State (IS) as early as 2017, were formally recognized as a chapter of IS–Central Africa Province (IS-CAP) in 2018, and formally pledged their allegiance to the IS in 2019. By that year, the ADF had split, with one part remaining loyal to Mukulu and the other to Baluku; the latter renewed their allegiance to the IS in April 2022. Since joining IS-CAP, the ADF increasingly targeted civilians into their attacks.

In response to growing causalities at the hands of the ADF, the Congolese and Ugandan armed forces created a joint military force called Operation Shujaa in November 2021. The Operation's already mixed perception, due to views of Uganda's role in the Second Congo War, was further put into question regarding its effectiveness in actually preventing ADF attacks.

A couple months prior to the attack in Mukondi, in January, the ADF carried out massacres in Kasindi and Makugwe, North Kivu.

== Massacre ==
During the night of 8–9 March 2023, the ADF used machetes to carry out a massacre in Mukondi, a village in North Kivu. Locals claimed that the attackers "came in a group, like visitors", until they began attacking people with machetes. The assailants attacked while villagers were celebrating International Women's Day, using machetes to kill over 30 people in Mukondi before killing several others in the nearby village of Mausa. The ADF also set fire to 15 houses and a clinic. Seventeen people were taken to hospital. Initially, the provincial governor of Kivu region Carly Nsanzu Kasivita gave a death toll of 36, while local sources put it at 44.

According to local officials, the death toll rose to over 39 killed in the following days, with a large amount injured. Some residents of Mukondi returned after the attack. Congolese army spokesman Anthony Mualushayi stated that the Mukondi attack was carried out in reprisal to a Congolese operation arresting 22 ADF militants and pharmacies allegedly supplying them with bomb-making chemicals.

The Islamic State, which the ADF is a part of, released a statement claiming responsibility for the attacking and claiming it killed "Christians". Mukondi chief Deogratias Kasereka claimed that per modus operandi of the ADF, no guns were used in the attack.

== See also ==
- 2020 Democratic Republic of the Congo attacks
- 2021–2022 Democratic Republic of the Congo attacks
- Kivu conflict
- List of massacres in the Democratic Republic of the Congo
