= 2017 Semuliki attack =

2017 combat of the ADF insurgency

- Part of Allied Democratic Forces insurgency
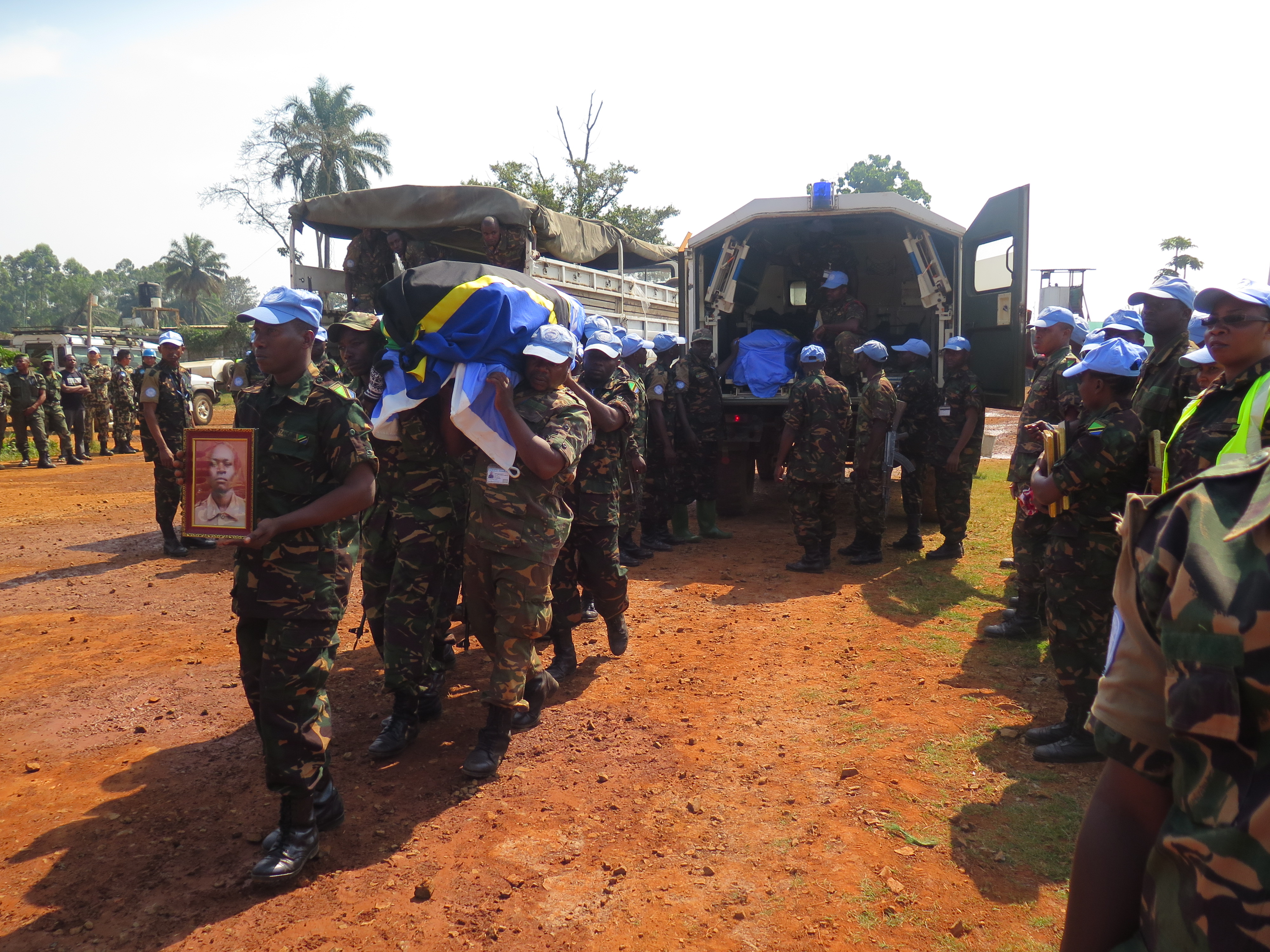
- Funeral ceremony paying tribute to the fallen Tanzanian soldiers, in Beni, 11 December 2017.
Date	7 December 2017
Location	Semuliki, North Kivu, Democratic Republic of the Congo
Result	Indecisive

Belligerents
MONUSCO: Tanzania; Democratic Republic of the Congo	Allied Democratic Forces (suspected)

Strength
	Allegedly several hundred

Casualties and losses
15 peacekeepers killed 53 wounded 1 missing 2 APCs destroyed (Democratic Republic of the Congo) 5 soldiers killed	72 killed (Congolese government claim)

The 2017 Semuliki attack was an attack carried out by elements of the Allied Democratic Forces on a United Nations Organization Stabilization Mission in the Democratic Republic of the Congo (MONUSCO) operating base in the Beni Territory, North Kivu region of the Democratic Republic of the Congo on December 7, 2017. The attack was highly coordinated and resulted in the deaths of fifteen U.N. peacekeeping personnel and wounds to 53 others making it the deadliest incident for the U.N. since the deaths of twenty-four Pakistani peacekeepers in an ambush in Somalia in 1993. The attack was among many of the latest flare-ups in violence in the North Kivu region which borders Uganda and Rwanda and one of the ADF's deadliest attacks in recent history. U.N. Secretary-General António Guterres labeled the attack, "the worst attack on UN peacekeepers in the organization's recent history."

== Background ==
Since the early 1990s, the North Kivu province of the Democratic Republic of the Congo has been a hotbed of ethnic violence and human rights violations partially because the area is located adjacent to Rwanda and Uganda. The porous borders and intersecting ethnic groups have led to heavy fighting between rival militias and the Congolese army. Much of the fighting has been over the access to mineral deposits which are plentiful in the region and the Kivu conflict has led to the deaths of thousands of people and the displacement of millions more. The United Nations has maintained an international presence in the region under the banner of MONUSCO since 1999, deploying peacekeepers and sending humanitarian aid.

In 2013, the rebel group Mouvement du 23 Mars (M23) surrendered to the government. This surrender, however, did little to ease the fighting and armed groups splintered even further. There are reported to be 70 armed groups operating in the region. One of the major groups continuing to perpetrate violence in the region has been the Allied Democratic Forces, an Islamist group with Ugandan origins, which in the last decade has transformed from a low level insurgent group to one of the most powerful factions in Kivu.

The ADF has been accused by Ugandan and U.N. officials of having links to foreign terrorist groups such as Al-Shabaab; however, these links are widely considered dubious due to a lack of strong evidence. In 2016, the ADF were suspected to have been behind the Beni massacre, infiltrating the city of Beni in North Kivu during the night of 14 August and killing 64–101 people, many of them by hacking. In October 2017, the ADF was blamed for an attack on a U.N. base that killed two Tanzanian peacekeepers and wounded twelve others in Beni. The same month, ADF fighters killed 22 people, many of them state officials, in the Beni region, when they ambushed a convoy of motorcycles with machetes and guns.

== Attack ==
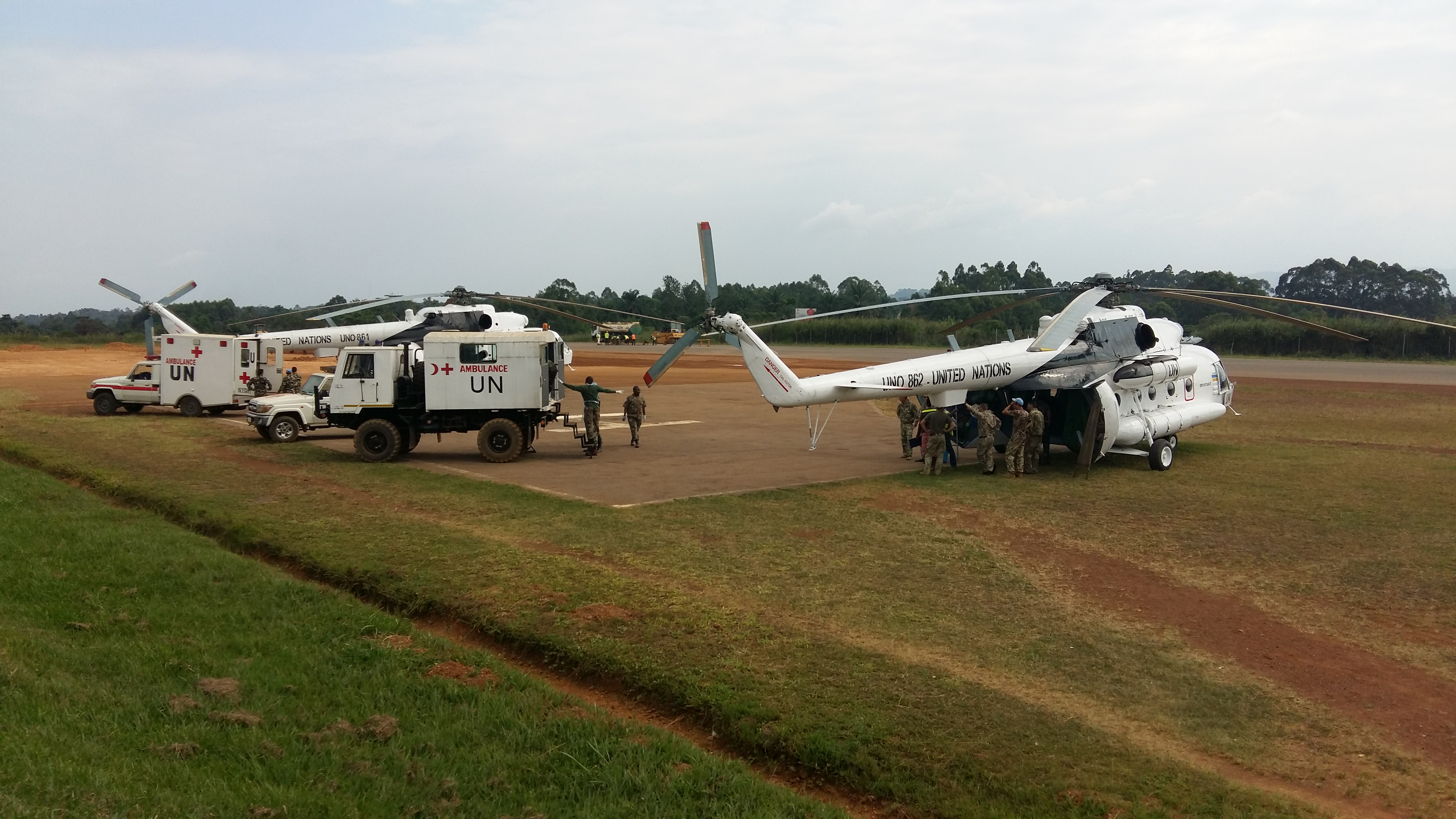
Medical evacuation from Beni Airport of peacekeepers wounded in the attack, 8 December 2017.

Shortly before 5:00 pm on December 7, 2017, a large group of armed individuals wearing Congolese army uniforms appeared at the gate of the MONUSCO base located on the banks of the Semliki River. Expecting Congolese troops, the U.N. peacekeepers let the armed men in who promptly began attacking the base's communications infrastructure, severing connection with reinforcements, although the peacekeepers were able to send a distress call before communications were cut. The Tanzanian peacekeepers returned fire, and ADF reinforcements arrived who outnumbered the peacekeepers. ADF fighters were heavily armed with mortars and rocket-propelled grenades and destroyed many U.N. vehicles, including two armored personnel carriers, an ambulance, and a truck. Fighting lasted until 8:00 pm when ADF fighters withdrew. The attack resulted in the deaths of fifteen United Nations peacekeepers from Tanzania and wounded 53 others. Additionally, one peacekeeper remains missing. A further five Congolese government troops were killed. According to a Congolese army captain, 72 ADF fighters were killed though this number remains unconfirmed.

== Aftermath and reaction ==
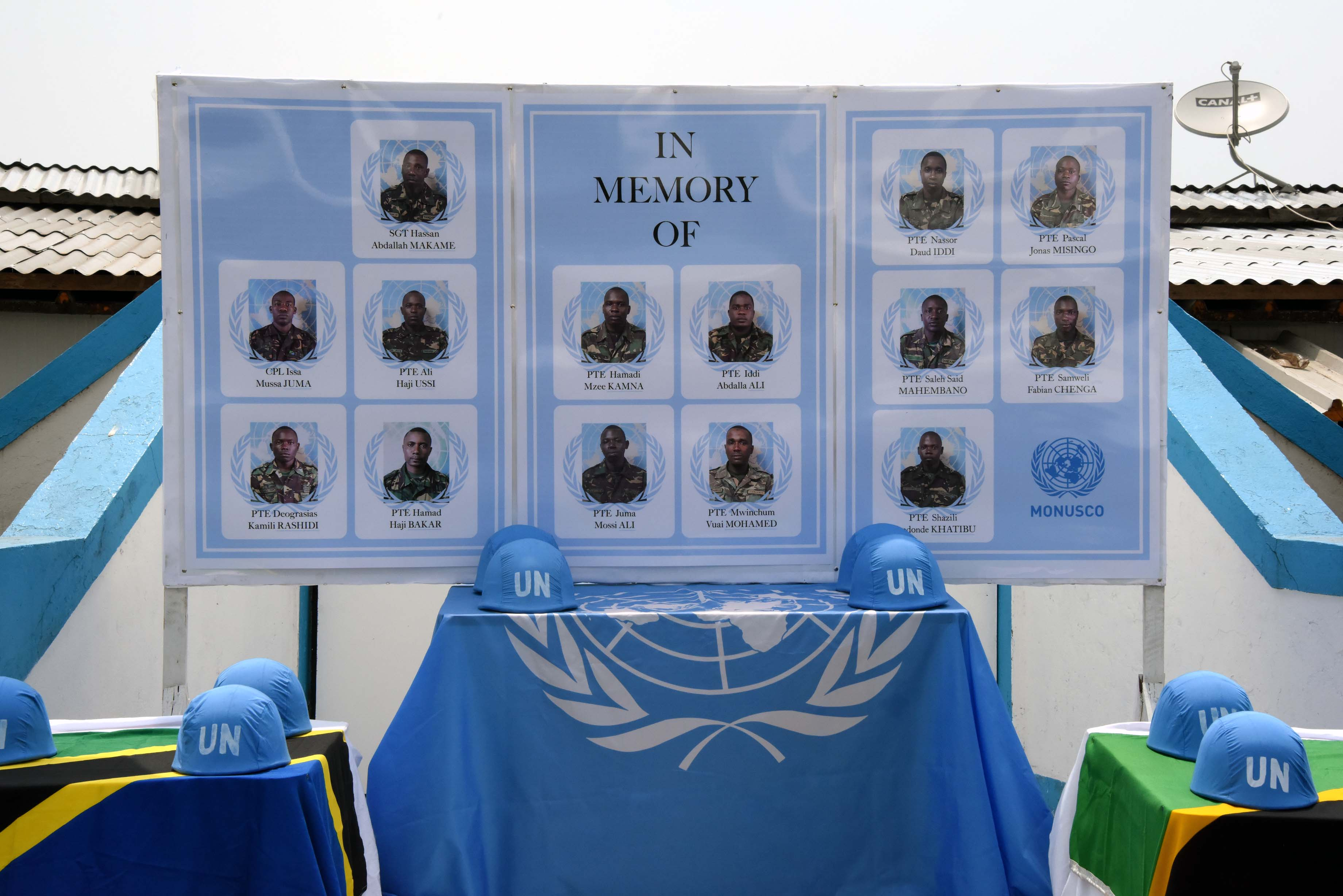
Portraits of the fourteen fallen peacekeepers.

The attack on the Semuliki river MONUSCO outpost was the deadliest attack on peacekeepers in the United Nations' history since twenty-four Pakistani peacekeepers were killed in Somalia in 1993. U.N. Secretary-General António Guterres in a statement condemning the attack said, "I condemn this attack unequivocally. These deliberate attacks against UN peacekeepers are unacceptable and constitute a war crime. I call on the DRC authorities to investigate this incident and swiftly bring the perpetrators to justice. There must be no impunity for such assaults, here or anywhere else." President John Magufuli of Tanzania expressed shock, urged calm, and prayers for the speedy recovery of those injured in the attack. The U.S. Department of State said it was "horrified" by the attack and the department's Bureau of African Affairs expressed its "deepest condolences" to the families of those killed or wounded.
