= 2020 Democratic Republic of the Congo attacks =

Series of terrorist attacks

The 2020 Democratic Republic of the Congo attacks were a series of attacks which took place in 2020. The attacks were mostly carried out by the Allied Democratic Forces (ADF), a radical Islamist rebel group and the Cooperative for the Development of Congo (CODECO), an agricultural and religious group made up of ethnic Lendu people. The attacks left at least 1,316 people dead and 132 injured.

== Attacks ==
Date	Location	Dead	Injured	Details
1 January	Mugunga neighbourhood, Goma	1	unknown	A man was killed after an attack by unknown armed men in Mugunga neighbourhood.
6 January	Kabumba and Mutwangano, Rutshuru Territory	15 (+1)	7	The Nyatura Domi attacked the FARDC and the NDC-R in the villages of Kabumba and Mutwangano. The FARDC and NDC-R resisted and repelled the attack. 6 NDC-R fighters were killed, 9 civilians were killed, one Nyatura Domi was killed, and 7 NDC-R were wounded.
22 January	Beni Territory, North Kivu	6	unknown	6 civilians were killed in an ADF attack in the Beni territory.
22 January	Mayi-Moy, Beni Territory	11	1	11 civilians were killed and one was wounded in an ADF raid.
22 January	Mabasele neighbourhood, Oicha, Beni Territory	2	unknown	The ADF murdered a man and a 5-year-old child in Mabasele neighbourhood. The ADF also set fire to three houses.
28 January	Manzingi, Beni Territory	38	unknown	38 civilians were killed in an ADF raid on the village of Manzingi.
30 January	Mantumbi, Beni Territory	13	unknown	13 civilians were killed in an ADF raid on the village of Mantumbi.
3 February	Kitso, Masisi territory	14	unknown	The Nyatura Jean-Marie attacked the NDC-R in the village of Kitso. The deaths were only among 14 civilians.
7 February	Beni territory, North Kivu	8	unknown	8 civilians were killed in an ADF attack in the Beni territory.
9 February	Makeke, North Kivu	7	unknown	60 ADF fighters attacked the village of Makeke, North Kivu, and kill seven people.
17 February	Beni territory	10	unknown	An ADF attack in Beni kills at least eight civilians, an intelligence agent, and a Congolese soldier.
17 February	Halungupa, Beni territory	11	unknown	1 FARDC soldier and 10 civilians were killed in an ADF raid on Halungupa. They also looted and set fire to many places.
18 February	Southeast of Beni	12	unknown	ADF militants kill 12 people and burn down several houses southeast of Beni.
19 February	Virunga National Park	5	unknown	Five civilians were hostage by the ADF are found murdered near Virunga National Park.
1 March	northeastern Ituri province	24	12	CODECO militia fighters are accused of killing 24 civilians and injured 12 others in an attack on a village in northeastern Ituri province.
7 March	Mayangose, Beni Territory	21	unknown	21 FARDC soldiers were killed in an ambush by the ADF. 3 PKM weapons, 7 RPG weapons and 11 AK47 weapons were stolen. MONUSCO peacekeepers brought the wounded soldiers back by helicopter. 8 FARDC soldiers are still missing.
30 March	North Kivu	3	unknown	An ADF skirmish left two people and one Congolese soldier dead.
7 April	Halungupa, Beni territory, North Kivu	6	unknown	6 civilians were killed in an ADF at the village of Halungupa.
14 April	Beni territory, North Kivu	3 (+5)	unknown	Two soldiers and a civilian were killed when ADF attacked the army in Beni.
15 April	Koli, Ituri	22	unknown	22 civilians were killed in a CODECO attack on the village of Koli.
24 April	Virunga National Park	18	unknown	18 people were killed including 12 park rangers when 60 FDLR militiamen ambushed their convoy.
25 April	Kavumu, Rutshuru territory	2	unknown	Soldiers from the Rwanda Defence Force (RDF) killed a woman and her child in a field in the village Kavumu.
26 April	Birega, Rutshuru territory	1	unknown	RDF soldiers forced 4 men to carry goods for them. One of the men were killed by the RDF soldiers.
2 May	Marabho, Ituri	12 (+8)	2 (+6)	Kyini ya kilima attacked an army base and killed 12 people including 4 government soldiers.
16–17 May	Djugu territory, Ituri	20	17	20 civilians were killed and 17 other wounded after an attack by the CODECO.
24 May	Beni territory	9	unknown	ADF fighters attacked civilians in Beni killing nine. The militants burned down houses, before retreating after a gunfight with the army. The army suffered several injuries during the gunfight.
25 May	Makutano	17	unknown	The ADF killed 17 people in Makutano.
25 May	Loselose, Beni territory	9	unknown	The ADF attacked the FARDC in the village of Loselose killing 2 soldiers and 7 civilians. 6 houses were also burned down.
26 May	Samboko, Ituri Province	40	unknown	The ADF attacked Samboko village in Ituri Province. The attackers killed 40 people using machetes and looted the village of food and valuables.
27 May	Otokaka-Makembi, Beni Territory	23 (+7)	unknown	The ADF attacked the FARDC in the village of Otokaka-Makembi. In total 23 FARDC soldiers and 7 ADF militants were killed.
3 June	Moussa, Ituri	16	unknown	At least 16 people, including women and children, were killed by CODECO militiamen in Moussa village.
16 June	Eringeti-Kainama road, North Kivu	6	unknown	The ADF killed 6 civilians and burned 60 homes alone the Eringeti-Kainama road.
19 June	North Kivu	9	unknown	9 people were kidnapped and then killed by the ADF in the North Kivu province.
20 June	Bukaka, North Kivu	10	unknown	10 people were killed when the ADF Attacked the village of Bukaka.
20 June	Biangolo, North Kivu	10	unknown	Another 10 Civilians were killed when the ADF attacked the village of Biangolo.
21 June	Vukaka, Ituri	10	unknown	10 people were killed when the ADF attacked the village of Vukaka.
22 June	Beni, North Kivu province	1	1	An Indonesian peacekeeper was killed and another one injured when ISCAP ambushed their convoy.
5 July	Bakua Tamba, Kasai	7	17	Seven people were killed over a land dispute between the Kuba and Luba communities over where they could cultivate land.
5 July	Matete, Djugu territory, Ituri	11	none	CODECO attacked two convoys coming from Bunia in the village of Matete and killed 11.
8 July	Djugu territory, Ituri	20	unknown	CODECO militia attacked the territory of djugu, north of Bunia, and killed 20 people.
8 July	Bounzenzele, Djugu territory	39+	3+	400 to 500 CODECO militiamen raided the village of Bounzenzele killing 37 civilians and 2 FARDC soldiers.
9 July	Sindani-Akesi, Ituri	25	10	Members of the CODECO attacked the locality of Sindani-Akesi and targeted civilians.
16 July	Mwenga Territory, South Kivu	220	unknown	Kipupu massacre - More than 220 people were killed in Mwenga Territory, South Kivu.
20 July	Mayolo, Ituri	5	unknown	CODECO militia attacked the village of Mayolo, killing five people.
21 July	Andasia, Ituri	7	unknown	CODECO militia attacked the village of Andasia, killing seven people.
28 July	Mutido, North Kivu	6 (+1)	unknown	6 civilians and one ADF fighter were killed in an ADF attack on FARDC troops in Mutido village.
30 July	Sange, Uvira territory	12	unknown	A drunken soldier in Sange opened fire on passers-by, killing at least 12 people including a two-year-old girl.
31 July	Bukima, Rutshuru territory	2	1	Ex-M23 fighters attacked FARDC troops in the village of Bukima killing 2 soldiers and wounding another. The attackers also stole some weapons.
9 August	Ituri province	19	unknown	19 people were killed when CODECO attacked 3 villages in Ituri Province.
14 August	Mbau, Beni territory	4	unknown	4 farmers were killed in an ADF at the village of Mbau.
15 August	Mwenda, North Kivu	8	unknown	8 people were killed in an ADF attack on the village of Mwenda.
15 August	Kpolowu, Ituri Province	0 (+2)	2	ADF militants clashed with the army at the village of Kpolowu.
22 August	Kinziki-Matiba and Wikeno villages, North Kivu	13	unknown	Suspected Islamist militants killed 13 people during raids on two villages in eastern Democratic Republic of the Congo, the army and a village chief report. It is the latest of such attacks that the United Nations says may be war crimes. The ADF have killed more than 1,000 people since 2019, according to UN figures.
24 August	Mapasana and Mabuo villages, Beni territory	20	unknown	Twenty bodies were discovered in the villages of Mapasana and Mabuo. They are thought to be killed by the ADF.
25 August	Mbau, Beni territory	4	unknown	Four bodies were found in the village of Mbau after an attack by the ADF.
26 August	Beni territory	20	unknown	20 people were killed in an ADF attack on 3 villages.
28 August	Tinameme, Beni territory	11 (+2)	unknown	8 FARDC soldiers and 3 civilians were killed when a FARDC convoy was ambushed by the ADF. 2 ADF militants were also killed.
31 August	Bilalombili and Ngez, Mwenga territory, South Kivu	7	9	A battle broke out when the Ngumino, Twiganeho, and Makanika attacked the FARDC in the villages of Bilalombili and Ngezi. The FARDC was able to protect finalist students who were doing their state exams in Mikenge, but the attacks were still able to kill 7 civilians, rape a girl, wound 8 civilians, and wound a soldier. Livestock were also stolen by the attackers and 250 houses were set ablaze.
8 September	Tshabi Area, Ituri Province	23	unknown	ADF militants, fleeing military pressure in Beni, stormed the village of Tshabi, killing 23 people.
10 September	Tshabi Area, Ituri Province	35	unknown	ADF militants once again attacked Tshabi, killing 35 people. It was the second attack in the town in two days. The terrorists assaulted civilians with knives and firearms and destroyed the village.
16 September	Lubero, North Kivu	1	1	A worker with the British charity World Vision was killed in an ambush on a humanitarian convoy in Lubero by Mai-Mai militias. The attack also left another injured.
20 September	Mbau, Beni territory, North-Kivu	10	unknown	ADF rebels killed 10 civilians in the town of Mbau.
20 September	Kitoho, Beni Territory	14	2	13 civilians and one FARDC soldier were killed after a raid by the ADF. Another FARDC soldier and civilian were wounded.
24 September	Mutuanga, Beni territory, North-Kivu	5	unknown	ADF rebels killed 5 civilians in the town of Mutuanga.
25 September	Lubumbashi, Haut-Katanga Province	3 (+16)	unknown	200 Mai Mai militiamen attack Lubumbashi and beheaded two policemen and a soldier before getting repelled with 16 casualties. Mai-Mai Kata Katanga has also been blamed for the attack.
30 September	Ituri province	5 (+6)	4 (+6)	Three soldiers and 2 civilians were killed when Front for Patriotic Resistance in Ituri (FRPI) attacked their positions.
3 October	Fizi territory, South Kivu	3	2	Three people were killed when a soldier of the Congolese army opened fire on a group of people.
5 October	Beni territory, North Kivu	6	Unknown	At least 6 people were killed when the ADF attack their village in North Kivu.
5 October	Mamove locality, Beni Territory	10	unknown	10 civilians were killed after an attack by the ADF and Mai-Mai Kyandenga against the FARDC in Mamove.
16 October	Mayanza and Batibi, Ituri province	10	1	10 Civilians were killed and one injured in an attack with machetes in the villages of Mayanza and Batibi by an unknown armed group.
16 October	Bakadinda, Irumu Territory, Ituri	14	unknown	14 people were killed due to a conflict between two people groups in Bakadinda.
19 – 21 October	Tombwe sector, Mwenga territory and Lulenge sector, Fizi territory	20 (+20)	unknown	Clashes between the Ngumino-Twigwaneho coalition and Mai-Mai militias lead to the death of 16 Ngumino-Twigwaneho militias, and 4 Mai-Mai militias. The administrator of the Fizi territory reported the death toll to be as high as 40 deaths, including civilians.
20 October	Beni, Beni territory, North Kivu	2	0	1,335 prisoners were freed when militants attacked Kangbayi central prison and a military camp that provided security to it. So far at least 20 parishioners have been recaptured. 2 inmates were killed in the attack. The ADF has been blamed for the attack, but the ISCAP claimed responsibility for the attack.
20 October	Lyakobo neighborhood, Beni city	4	unknown	Unidentified armed men who escaped from the Kangbayi central prison killed three men and a woman.
20 October	Mbilali, Beni territory	3	unknown	Unidentified armed men who escaped from Kangbayi central prison abducted and later killed three men.
20 October	Luoyi, North Kivu	3	1 (+3)	Three policemen died, and one was wounded while letting artisanal miners escape from a mining site when an unidentified armed group attacked it. Three of the armed men were wounded.
23 October	Kibuana, Beni territory	11	unknown	11 bodies were found in Kibuana after an ADF attack.
28 October	Baeti village, Oicha, North Kivu	19	0	Suspected ADF militants kill at least 18 people and burn down a church, along with 40 homes in an attack on the village of Baeti near Oicha in North Kivu.
29 October	Kukwe, Matungu, Titi, and Buakacha, Walikale territory.	48	unknown	The NDC-R killed at least 48 people in the villages of Kukwe, Matungu, Titi, and Buakacha.
30 October	village of Lisasa, Beni territory, North Kivu	21	unknown	An ADF attack killed 21 people in the village of Lisasa. People were also kidnaped, a health center was looted, homes were set on fire, and a Catholic church was vandalized.
3 November	Ezekere, Ituri	5	5	CODECO attacked a FARDC military post in the village of Ezekere and killed 5 soldiers and seriously injured 5 others.
3 November	Lumanza, Beni territory	4	unknown	The ADF killed 4 men in their fields in the village of Lumanza.
7 November	town of Kisima, Beni territory, North Kivu	7	unknown	An ADF attack killed 7 people in the village of Kisima.
7 November	Lio, Djugu territory, Ituri	4	7	The CODECO attacked the village of Lio and killed 4 people and wounded 7 others. The CODECO then fought with a self-defence group known as Zaire for a couple of hours until the army intervened.
8 November	Oicha, Beni territory, North Kivu	6	unknown	An ADF attack killed 6 people in Oicha city.
8 November	Koga, Ituri	3	unknown	FARDC soldiers clashed with the CODECO in Koga and killed 3 civilians. Those soldiers also allegedly burn down the villages of Tsumbr, Gokpa and Satchu, Penyi Groupement, Ituri after the clash.
9 November	Mbujimayi, Beni territory	4	unknown	The ADF raided the village of Mbujimayi and killed 4 civilians.
17 November	Gety, Walendu Bind chiefdom, Ituri	1	2	FRPI militiamen murdered a man and shot two of his family members.
17 November	Virunga National Park	29	unknown	29 bodies were found in Virunga National Park after being killed by ADF terrorists.
17 November	Kokola, Beni territory, North Kivu	6	1	6 People were killed after ADF militants attacked the village of Kokola.
17 November	Baeti-Bunyuka, Batangi-Mbau Groupement	7	unknown	ADF killed 7 people in an attack on the village of Baeti-Bunyuka.
19–20 November	Kabare territory, South kivu	2	unknown	Unidentified gunmen killed a 17-year-old girl and a chiefdom tax collector in Karbare Territory.
21 November	Abuluma 1, Wazabho Groupement, Djugu territory	3	unknown	3 people were shot dead when the CODECO attacked the village of Abuluma 1 and looted several houses.
12 December	Beni, North Kivu province	6	24	six were killed and 24 kidnaped in an ADF attack.
22 December	Bulongo, Kambalango district	5	1	four civilians and one soldier were killed in an ADF attack on the town of Bulongo, two others were injured. Six shops were also damaged by the group.
28 December	Losoloso, Beni territory, North Kivu	17	Unknown	The ADF attacked army camps in the village of Losoloso, killing 17 soldiers.
30 December	bijombo, south kivu	6	Unknown	Six civilian were killed by Ngumino and Twiganeho militias in a refugee camp in bijombo, south kivu.
31 December	Beni territory, North Kivu	26	unknown	26 civilians were killed when the ADF killed farmers in their fields.

== See also ==
- 2021–2024 Democratic Republic of the Congo attacks
