= Byambwe massacre =

2025 massacre in Byambwe, Democratic Republic of the Congo

The Byambwe massacre was a massacre perpetrated by the Allied Democratic Forces (ADF) against civilians between 14 and 15 November 2025.

== Background ==
Following the radicalization of its founding leader, Jamil Mukulu, the ADF was formed as a merger of several rebel groups (initially called ADF/NALU) in 1995. The ADF initially operated in western Uganda but has since, and currently continues to operate solely in the eastern DRC; this includes the North Kivu and Ituri Provinces.

The ADF's leadership shifted after the imprisonment of Mukulu on 30 April 2015. Musa Seka Baluku, Mukulu's second-in-command since the group's formation, stepped forward in his place shortly after. Under Baluku's leadership, the group made contact with the Islamic State (IS) as early as 2017, were formally recognized as a chapter of IS–Central Africa Province (IS-CAP) in 2018, and formally pledged their allegiance to the IS in 2019. By that year, the ADF had split, with one part remaining loyal to Mukulu and the other to Baluku; the latter renewed their allegiance to the IS in April 2022. Since joining IS-CAP, the ADF increasingly targeted civilians into their attacks.

In response to growing causalities at the hands of the ADF, the Congolese and Ugandan armed forces created a joint military force called Operation Shujaa in November 2021. The Operation's already mixed perception, due to views of Uganda's role in the Second Congo War, was further put into question regarding its effectiveness in actually preventing ADF attacks. According to BBC Monitoring, 90% of the IS' operations were carried out in Africa by September 2025, of which the ADF committed the second-highest number of civilian killings by a non-state actors globally in 2025, according to Armed Conflict Location and Event Data (ACLED).

== Massacre ==
In the night between 14 and 15 November 2025, Islamic State-backed terrorists killed 28 civilians in the village of Byambwe near Lubero in the North Kivu province of the Democratic Republic of the Congo. The massacre was perpetrated by the Allied Democratic Forces (ADF) amidst the Kivu conflict. Seventeen of the victims, including breastfeeding women and sick patients were massacred inside a Catholic church-run hospital. Eleven women and six men were killed in the hospital. The patients were killed while in beds, after which two hospital wards, maternity ward and operating ward, were set on fire. The United Nations (UN) described the incident as "one of the most appalling attacks in a new wave of violence by the Allied Democratic Forces (ADF)." The Byambwe massacre was part of a series of attacks carried out by ADF between 13 and 19 November in the Lubero Territory. According to the UN, at least 89 people were killed in those attacks as of 21 November 2025.

== See also ==
- Komanda massacre
