= Boga and Tchabi massacres =

Terrorist incident in Democratic Republic of the Congo

- Part of Allied Democratic Forces insurgency, Ituri conflict, and the Banyabwisha-Nyali conflict
- Location: Boga and Tchabi, Ituri Province, Democratic Republic of the Congo
- Date: May 30–31, 2021; 1am
- Target: Nyali refugees, civilians in Boga and Tchabi
- Deaths: 57+
- Injuries: 47+
- Victims: 25+ civilians kidnapped
- Perpetrator: Banyabwisha fighters in ISCAP

On the night between May 30 and 31, 2021, jihadists from the Islamic State – Central Africa Province (ISCAP) attacked the towns of Boga and Tchabi, killing a total of fifty-seven civilians and injuring forty-seven others. The attacks were one of the deadliest massacres ever perpetrated by ISCAP.

== Background ==
Following the radicalization of its founding leader, Jamil Mukulu, the ADF was formed as a merger of several rebel groups (initially called ADF/NALU) in 1995. The ADF initially operated in western Uganda but has since, and currently continues to operate solely in the eastern DRC; this includes the North Kivu and Ituri Provinces.

The ADF's leadership shifted after the imprisonment of Mukulu on 30 April 2015. Musa Seka Baluku, Mukulu's second-in-command since the group's formation, stepped forward in his place shortly after. Under Baluku's leadership, the group made contact with the Islamic State (IS) as early as 2017, were formally recognized as a chapter of IS–Central Africa Province (IS-CAP) in 2018, and formally pledged their allegiance to the IS in 2019. By that year, the ADF had split, with one part remaining loyal to Mukulu and the other to Baluku. Since joining IS-CAP, the ADF increasingly targeted civilians into their attacks.

Boga and Tchabi are two towns located ten kilometers apart along the border between North Kivu and Ituri Province, where the ADF is active. Around 48,000 people lived in both towns combined; 30,000 in Boga, 18,000 in Tchabi. Boga was home to a displacement camp hosting refugees mainly from the Nyali people in one part of the camp and Banyabwisha people in another part. The head of the Nyali community in the area told Al Jazeera that they believed it was the same attacker for both villages. Banyabwisha are Rwandan refugees who had settled in the area since 2019, and were in a war with the Nyali over land rights. Médecins Sans Frontières warned Congolese and United Nations authorities in April 2020 about the chances of a jihadist attack in Boga and Tchabi due to few defenses in the towns.

Prior to the attack, the Congolese government claimed that Congolese forces were unable to prevent the attack and establish a position as ISCAP fighters ambushed them as they were setting up the position. A battle ensued, and both sides retreated from the area.

== Massacres ==
The camp at Boga was the first attacked, around 1am on May 31. ISCAP fighters besieged the camp, and then indiscriminately shot civilians and burned down houses. A witness to the massacre in Boga said that he was alerted after hearing cries from his neighbor's house. When he arrived at the house, the perpetrators had already killed an Anglican pastor and wounded his daughter. Residents' houses were looted and torched, and vehicles located on the nearby road were burnt out. 26 people were killed at the Ruhindo displaced camp in Boga and three were killed in the Kinyanjojo camp. 47 others were reported injured in both the Boga and Tchabi massacres, and twelve people were still being treated in the Boga hospital as of June 3.

ISCAP fighters then attacked the town of Tchabi, killing over 24 people and injuring dozens of others. Some civilians were abducted from the town as well. Between both villages, 57 civilians were killed and 47 were injured, along with at least 25 civilians kidnapped. Some estimates by local civil society members and Gracien Iracan, a Congolese MP, assessed the death toll at above sixty killed. Forty of the victims were Nyali, and ten of them were Hema. Almost every one of the 48,000 refugees originally located in the towns also fled following the massacres, some to Uganda and many to Bukiringi. Many of the newly displaced refugees were sleeping in the bush to evade the attacks. Around 5,335 refugees were in these conditions as of June 6.

== Aftermath ==
=== Perpetrator ===
The president of the Irumu Territory civil society stated that the attackers were suspected to be Banyabwisha members of ISCAP, as the Banyabwisha section of the Boga camp was untouched during the attacks. These claims of Banyabwisha ISCAP fighters were reiterated by Jules Ngongo, the spokesman for the FARDC in Ituri. Congolese authorities confirmed the Islamic State's responsibility in conducting the attack on June 5.

=== Reactions ===
Congolese authorities in Kinshasa did not immediately react to the massacres. David McLachlan-Karr, the UN Humanitarian Coordinator for the DRC, condemned the attack. Congolese authorities released a statement calling the massacres a humiliation and demanding justice on June 3. The European Union condemned the attacks as well.

=== Subsequent attacks ===
On June 7, brief clashes occurred at noon between the FARDC and ISCAP near Boga. It was later reported that these clashes were caused by an ISCAP attack on the hospital in Boga, killing ten civilians and two of the jihadists. The hospital, which had previously served over 80,000 people in the area, was considered unusable.

MONUSCO and UN officials visited Tchabi and Boga between June 16 and 17, strengthening security measures in the area. Peacekeepers from Nepal, South Africa, Kenya, and Tanzania all were dispatched to hunt down the ISCAP militants nearby and protect the villages. Despite this, ISCAP fighters re-established a camp in Tchabi by June 18.
