= Beni massacre =

2016 massacre in the east of the Democratic Republic of Congo

- Part of Allied Democratic Forces insurgency and Kivu conflict
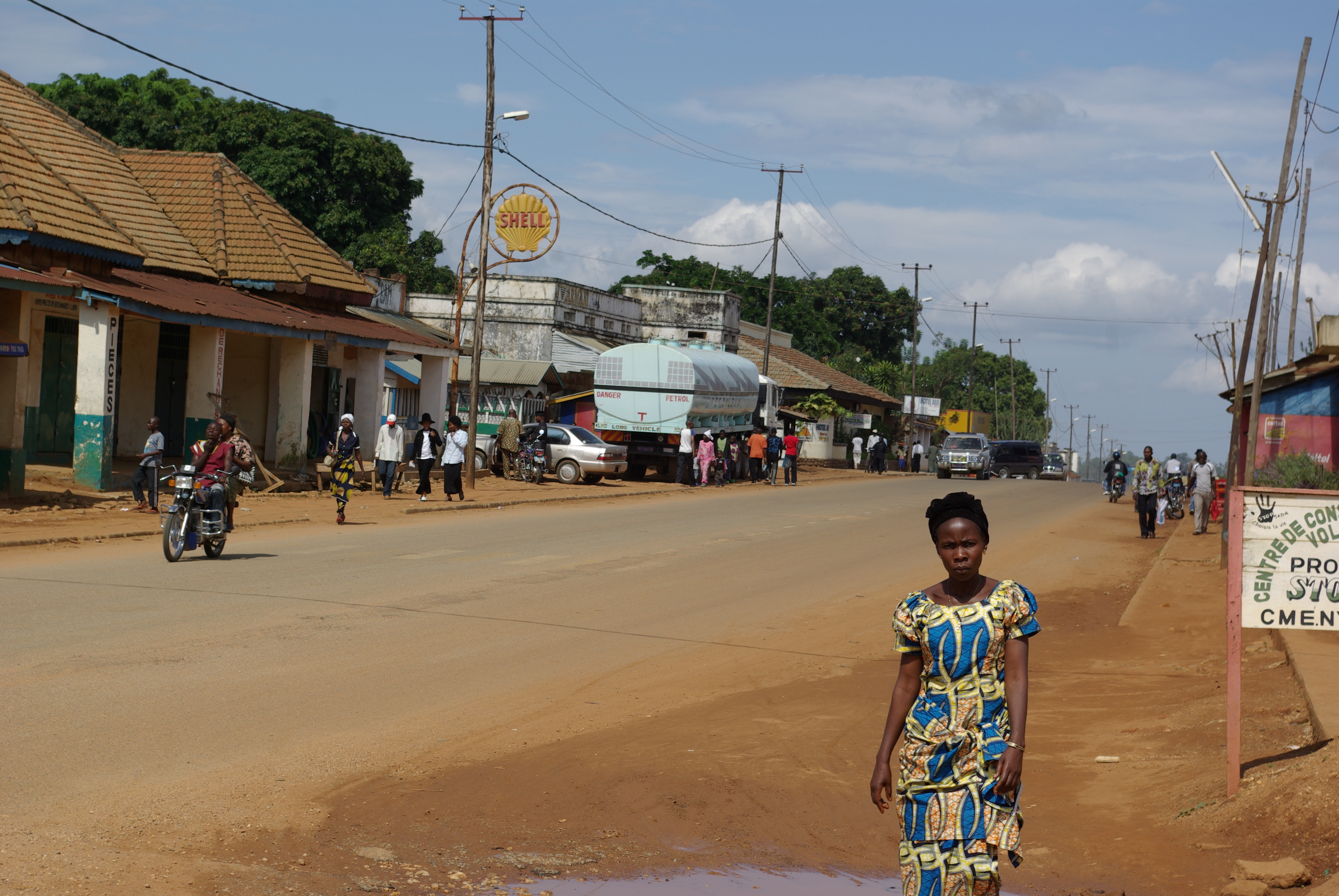
- An image taken of the small city of Beni.
- Location: Rwangoma, Beni, Virunga National Park, North Kivu, Democratic Republic of Congo
- Date: 14 August 2016 (CAT)
- Weapon: Melee attack
- Deaths: At least 64–101 killed in Beni massacre; 3 killed, at least 15 wounded in protests; 19–23 killed in Tshimbulu incident; Over 700-1,300 killed in related massacres in Beni from October 2014 to August 2016 & over 1,150 killed and kidnapped in North Kivu
- Injuries: Unknown
- Perpetrator: Allied Democratic Forces (blamed)

On 14 August 2016, multiple assailants raided the district of Rwangoma in the city of Beni which is located in North Kivu of the Democratic Republic of Congo (DRC). The city is located in the popular Virunga National Park. At least 64 people were killed, as 64 bodies had been located during the search. Officials estimate the death toll to be from 75 to 101. An unknown number of people were injured. The Ugandan rebel group Allied Democratic Forces (ADF) were suspected to be behind to attack by the DRC. The incident is another in a series of massacres in Beni that have left over 700 people dead since October 2014.

In 2018, a Congolese military tribunal convicted 134 people for the 2016 massacre and killings in previous years. The convicted were a mix of ADF rebels, militia fighters, civilians and local chiefs.

== Background ==
Following the radicalization of its founding leader, Jamil Mukulu, the ADF was formed as a merger of several rebel groups (initially called ADF/NALU) in 1995. The ADF initially operated in western Uganda but has since, and currently continues to operate solely in the eastern DRC; this includes the North Kivu and Ituri Provinces. The ADF's leadership shifted after the imprisonment of Mukulu on 30 April 2015. Musa Seka Baluku, Mukulu's second-in-command since the group's formation, stepped forward in his place shortly after.

=== Killings in Beni ===
Since October 2014 over 700 civilians have been killed in a series of massacres in and around Beni alone, with over 1,150 people being killed and kidnapped, and thousands more being displaced in North Kivu province since 2014. Ugandan President Yoweri Museveni and DRC President Joseph Kabila spoke about seeking a coordinated military strategy against the ADF during a 4 August meeting. On 8 August, less than one week before the massacre, an "armed group" killed 14 people near Beni. The blame for this attack centred on Mai-Mai ethnic militias, ethnic militant groups, and the Democratic Forces for the Liberation of Rwanda. 150 houses were destroyed in this attack that occurred immediately after President Joseph Kabila left the area. The president was in Beni three days before the 14 August massacre. Another attack by the ADF left a group of soldiers and UN peacekeepers wounded not long before the attack.

== Attack ==
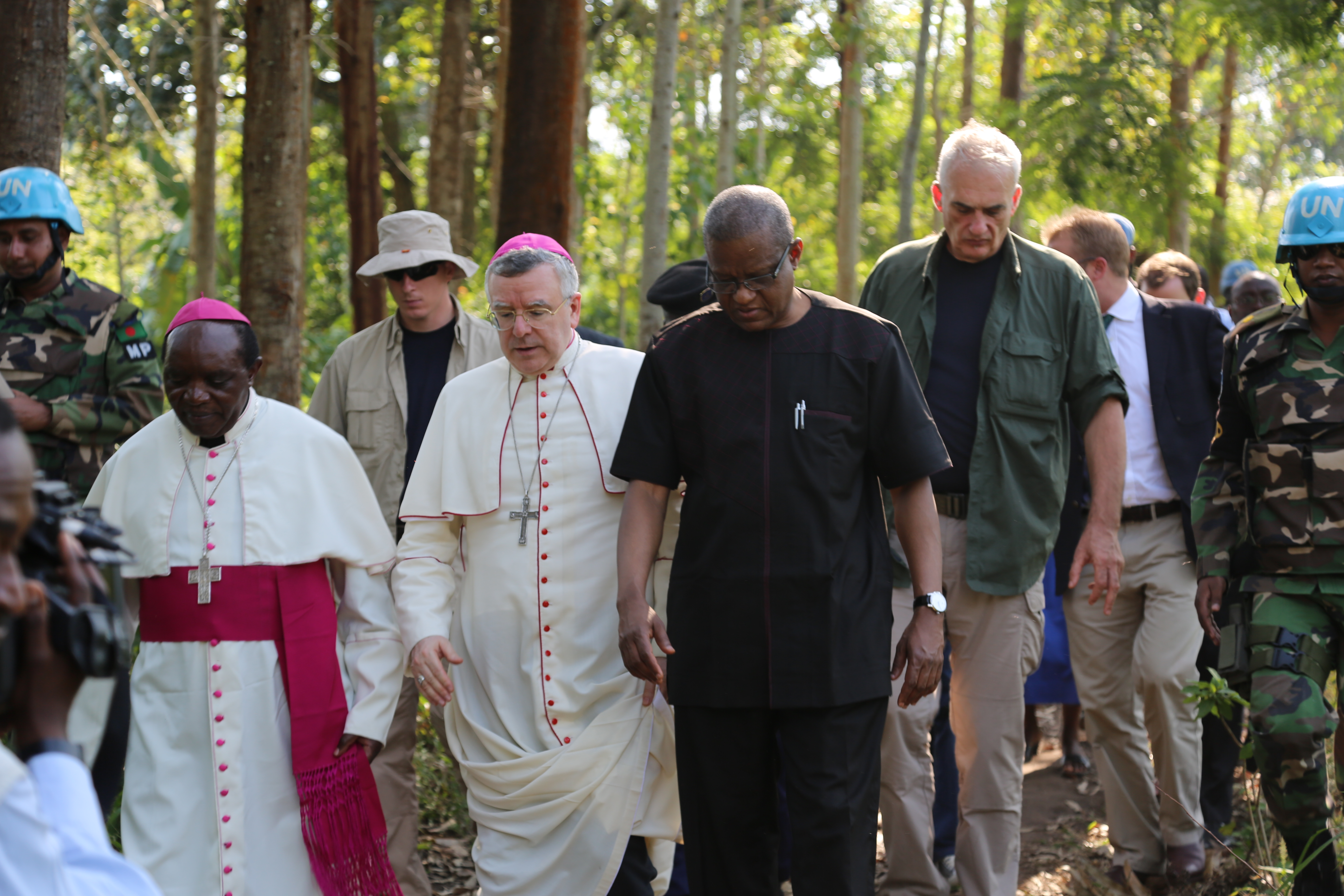
The local catholic bishop, the Nuncio Luis Mariano Montemayor, a UN diplomat Maman Sambo Sidikou and MONUSCO peacekeepers at the site of the massacre, on 26 August.

Attackers passed by military bases before going into the city, yet did not attack anyone there. The men came out of the forest near the city, and some were disguised as army members. The attackers were described as using melee weapons, and hacked people to death. Some attackers were spotted with guns, yet they were only seen using the guns as melee weapons. Machetes were also wielded by the attackers, with 51 bodies being found with machete wounds. The attack occurred during nighttime, confirmed Beni mayor Nyonyi Bwanakawa. The DRC claimed that they had found 64 bodies and were still searching, and officials said that the death toll will eventually reach 75 or 101. The number of injured is unknown, although Al Jazeera was able to locate a wounded survivor, who provided an interview.

== Aftermath ==
=== Perpetrators ===
Congolese officials all blamed the attack on the Islamic Ugandan rebel group called the Allied Democratic Forces, although the attack has many similarities to attacks that are committed by Boko Haram. A Congo Research Group at the New York University claimed that army soldiers have participated in the series of massacres, which includes the one in Beni, although the government strongly denied these claims.

In 2018, 134 people were convicted for their involvement in violence in Beni, including the 2016 massacre. Much of the group, a mix of ADF rebels, militia fighters, civilians and local chiefs, were convicted in absentia. 42 were sentenced to death. Only one army officer was convicted.

=== Domestic reaction ===
The president of the DRC, Joseph Kabila, labelled the attack as terrorism and issued a statement: "The terrorist massacre happening at the moment in the east is not different from what happened in Mali, France, Somalia and other corners of the world". After the attack, Kabila held a meeting with the members of the provincial supreme defense council in the capital of North Kivu province, Goma. Many high government officials also attended the meeting. The president then sent members of the national defense council along with Prime Minister Augustin Matata Ponyo to Beni. After arriving in Beni, he issued a statement. Ponyo called the incident a part of asymmetric warfare, and started to work on his delegation's response to the incident. Flags were thrown at half mast and a three day long period of mourning was announced.

Six suspects were eventually arrested and their hearing was attended by hundreds of people.

=== International reaction ===
- Holy See: Pope Francis called the international reaction to the incident a "shameful silence" He called for peace and harmony, and issued a statement: "My thoughts go to the people of North Kivu, in the DRC, who have been recently hit with fresh massacres, which have for some time been perpetrated in shameful silence, without attracting even as much as our attention. Unfortunately, they are part of the too many innocent people who have no weight on world opinion."
- United Methodist Church: A district superintendent of the church was wounded and two of his sisters were killed. The superintendent issued a statement, saying that 101 people were killed. Another leader lost three family members. Bishop Gabriel Unda said that "People are terribly suffering" from the "evil doers". She pleaded people to pray with her, while mentioning that the death toll is not yet completely known.
- United Nations: MONUSCO said that it "reiterates its support to the armed forces of the Democratic Republic of Congo and the Congolese National Police" to protect the civilian populations of Beni in the wake of the "barbaric act committed against the civilian population". They also agreed to increase their cooperation in ridding the DNC of armed groups. Ban Ki-moon strongly condemned the killing while confirming that the UN had deployed forces. His spokesperson also issued a statement on his behalf, noting the recent string of massacres and the need to "bring the assailants to justice".

=== Protests ===
After the attack, mass protests broke out, especially because of President Joseph Kabila's recent visit before the attack where he promised "peace and security". People began chanting anti-government slogans, protesting the lack of government security in the wake of thousands of deaths and kidnaps from massacres in the last two years.

On 18 August, protests turned violent as people turned on each other and policemen. Flags of the governing People's Party for Reconstruction and Democracy were lit on fire. Prime Minister Ponyo was loudly booed as he made a speech. Police and army members fired tear gas into the crowds and warning shots, but to no avail. The protesters barricaded streets, blocking them off. A man was then shot in the head and killed by a policeman, and more violence broke out. In the violence, a policeman was killed, three soldiers were injured, and six civilians were wounded. At least six protesters were violently arrested and taken to a military vehicle, where they were transported away. A woman who people suspected to be a member of the ADF was lynched, stoned, and burnt to death by protesters.

== See also ==
- Kivu conflict
- Second Congo War
- List of terrorist incidents in August 2016
- List of massacres in the Democratic Republic of the Congo
