= Matango, Democratic Republic of the Congo =

Matango
- Town
- Location within Democratic Republic of the Congo
- Coordinates: 0°37′N 29°17′E
- Country: Democratic Republic of the Congo
- Province: Ituri
- Time zone: UTC+2 (CAT)

Matango is a small town in Ituri Province in eastern Democratic Republic of the Congo. It is located several kilometres to the northeast by road of Beni.
