= Tingwe massacre =

Terrorist incident in Democratic Republic of the Congo

- Part of the Kivu conflict and the ADF insurgency
- Tingwe (Democratic Republic of the Congo) Approximate location of Tingwe within the Ituri Province, Democratic Republic of the Congo
- Native name: Massacre de Tingwe, Mauaji ya Tingwe
- Location: 0°45′36″N 29°40′48″E; Tingwe, Mwenda, and Nzenga North Kivu Province, Democratic Republic of the Congo
- Date: 31 December 2020
- Attack type: Mass murder and massacre
- Weapons: Machetes, axes, and arson
- Deaths: 30+ civilians
- Victim: Several civilians kidnapped
- Perpetrators: Islamic State; IS-CAP; ADF-Baluku

The Tingwe massacre (French: Massacre de Tingwe, Swahili: Mauaji ya Tingwe) occurred on 31 December 2020, when Islamic State-affiliated (IS) Allied Democratic Forces (ADF-Baluku) rebels attacked the village of Tingwe, North Kivu, Democratic Republic of the Congo, killing at least 30 people. Several other civilians were kidnapped as well. Subsequent massacres were carried out in the nearby towns of Mwenda and Nzenga.

== Background ==
Following the radicalization of its founding leader, Jamil Mukulu, the ADF was formed as a merger of several rebel groups (initially called ADF/NALU) in 1995. The ADF initially operated in western Uganda but has since, and currently continues to operate solely in the eastern DRC; this includes the North Kivu and Ituri Provinces.

The ADF's leadership shifted after the imprisonment of Mukulu on 30 April 2015. Musa Seka Baluku, Mukulu's second-in-command since the group's formation, stepped forward in his place shortly after. Under Baluku's leadership, the group made contact with the Islamic State (IS) as early as 2017, were formally recognized as a chapter of IS–Central Africa Province (IS-CAP) in 2018, and formally pledged their allegiance to the IS in 2019. By that year, the ADF had split, with one part remaining loyal to Mukulu and the other to Baluku. Since joining IS-CAP, the ADF increasingly targeted civilians into their attacks.

Tingwe has been the target of previous massacres by the ADF as it sits within an area known as the triangle of death: a tri-point between Eringeti, Kamando, and Mbau. It takes an hour to drive the sixty kilometers to Tingwe from Beni, the closest large city. In 2016, ADF militants attacked Tingwe, which at that time had a population of 350 people, and beheaded and massacred many of the residents, killing seventeen people.

== Massacre ==
Residents of Tingwe were in their fields preparing for New Year's Eve celebrations when ISCAP militants killed and kidnapped them. A representative of a civil society in Tingwe stated residents had alerted the Congolese army that ISCAP militants were in the area, passing from the east to the northeast near Eringeti. The representative to the governor in North Kivu stated that at least twenty-five people were killed and an unknown number were kidnapped, although survivors stated at least thirty people were killed. Many of the residents were beheaded, the modus operandi of the ISCAP.

== Aftermath and reactions ==
On January 5, 2021, ISCAP militants attacked the village of Mwenda in Beni Territory, killing twenty-two civilians in a similar manner to Tingwe.

Former governor of Katanga Moïse Katumbi condemned the massacre. UN secretary general António Guterres condemned the massacre on January 7, 2021.
