= 2020 Kangbayi prison break =

Terrorist incident in Democratic Republic of the Congo

- Part of Kivu conflict and Allied Democratic Forces insurgency
- Location: Kangbayi prison, Beni, Democratic Republic of the Congo
- Date: October 20, 2020; 4:30am
- Deaths: 2
- Perpetrator: ISCAP
- No. of participants: 1,335 prisoners freed
- Motive: Prison break

On October 20, 2020, jihadists from the Islamic State – Central Africa Province (ISCAP) raided the prison and neighboring military camp in Kangbayi, Democratic Republic of the Congo, releasing 1,335 prisoners of the original 1,456.

== Background ==
In 2019, the Islamist Allied Democratic Forces pledged allegiance to the Islamic State, creating IS's Central Africa Province based in the Democratic Republic of the Congo. ISCAP's main stronghold was Beni Territory in North Kivu, and the group launched its first attack against a Congolese military camp in Beni. In the days leading up to the prison break, the Islamic State announced a "Breaking the Walls" campaign intended on breaking IS militants out of prisons. The Kangbayi prison in Beni had been attacked once before in June 2017, and prior to the attack held a large number of ADF fighters. The mayor of Beni, Modeste Bakwanamaha, stated that there had been rumors before the attack about a planned break-out. The United Nations estimated that the prison held 1,456 inmates before the breakout.

== Prison break ==
The break-out occurred at 4:30 am local time, and a large number of ADF militants broke the door down with electrical equipment. The attack began with militants ambushing a Congolese military position on the Lao hill overlooking the prison and military base. Both ISCAP and the ADF claimed responsibility for an attack on the prison and military camp shortly afterward. 1,335 prisoners escaped the prison during the break-out, and 100 stayed. During the break-out, two prisoners were shot and killed. The prisoners included ADF militants and Mai-Mai fighters.

Twenty inmates later returned to Kangbayi prison and surrendered themselves to Congolese authorities, along with identifying the perpetrators of the break-out as ADF. The United Nations dispatched a patrol of peacekeepers to the Kangbayi prison after the break-out. Bakwanahama urged residents of Beni to be suspicious of people who might be escapees.
