= Mayi-Moya =

Coordinates: 0°46′13″N 29°34′11″E

Mayi-Moya is a village in Beni Territory, in the Democratic Republic of the Congo, a 25-mile drive from the city of Beni north on the RN4 road. It was the location of a massacre in 2016.
