= Oicha =

- Commune
- Commune d'Oicha
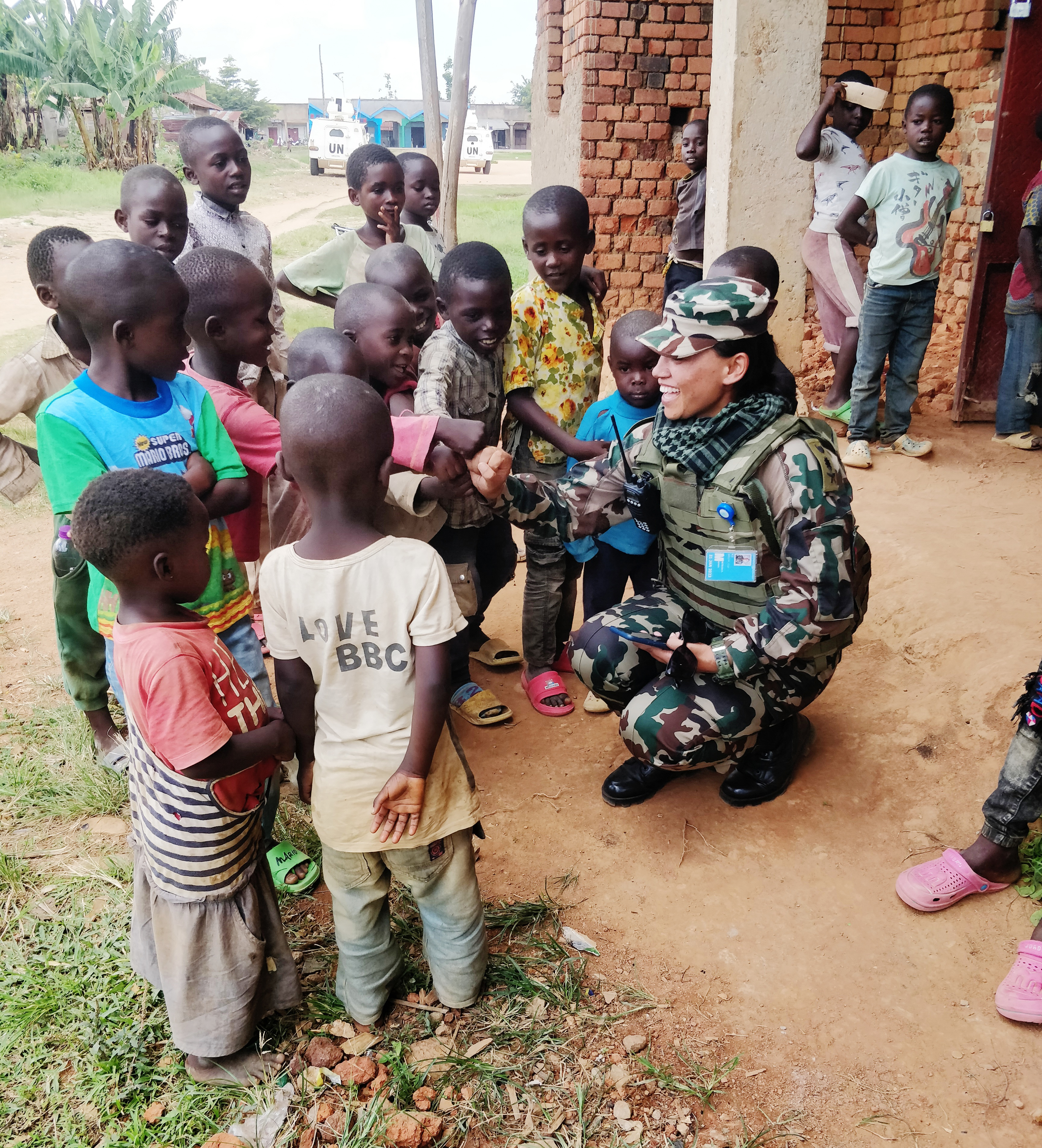
- children with MONUSCO peacekeeper from Nepal

- Location in DRC
- Coordinates: 0°41′51″N 29°31′11″E
- Country: DR Congo
- Province: North Kivu
- Territory: Beni

Government
  - Burgomaster: Eugénie Mwenge

Population (2012)
  - Total: 52,921
- Time zone: UTC+2 (Central Africa Time)
- Climate: Cwb

Oicha is a city in North Kivu Province, in eastern Democratic Republic of the Congo which was built around a mission hospital that opened in 1935. It has been a commune of Beni Territory before being elevated to the status of a city in 2026.

In August 2018 the Ebola outbreak in the Kivu province reached the city and vaccinations have been started by health organizations, led by WHO and supported by the MONUSCO mission by the United Nations.

On 30 September 2024, Eugénie Mwenge Kavira, took office as burgomaster (French: bourgmestre). She is the first woman appointed to lead Oicha's administration.

== From town to city ==
On 22 May 2026, Oicha was officially elevated from a border town (cité) to border city (ville) status by decree of the Vice‑Prime Minister of the Interior, Jacquemain Shabani. It became the fourth recognized city of the North Kivu province, joining Goma, Beni and Butembo. Following the administrative upgrade, Kambale Siluhwere Faustin was appointed mayor and Kahindo Kalumba Emmanuel, deputy mayor.
