= National Army for the Liberation of Uganda =

- Leaders: Amon Bazira †; Dusman Sabuni
- Dates active: 1988–1996
- Active regions: Western Uganda; Eastern Zaire; Zaire–Uganda border
- Ideology: Anti-Museveni
- Wars: the aftermath of the Ugandan Bush War

The National Army for the Liberation of Uganda (abbreviated NALU) was a rebel group opposed to the Ugandan government. It was formed in 1988 in western Uganda and moved into eastern Zaire, modern-day Democratic Republic of the Congo, where it merged with the Allied Democratic Forces (ADF), another Ugandan rebel group.

The NALU was created by Amon Bazira, a former Deputy Minister under Obote. After negotiating the armistice between the colonial-era Rwenzururu secessionist group and the second Obote regime in 1982, he enlisted the financial support of the Kenyan and Zairian governments to renew the resistance against the new government under the National Resistance Movement (NRM). The Uganda People's Defence Force (UPDF) drove the NALU into the Zaire, where the force eroded until the last remnants joined with the Allied Democratic Movement and the Uganda Muslim Liberation Army to form the ADF, with the sponsorship of the Sudanese government.

Bazira was succeeded by Jamil Mukulu (born David Steven), he was arrested in 2015 in Tanzania and currently awaiting trial the International criminal Court for crimes against humanity.
