= Deputy =

Person authorized to act on behalf of a higher-ranking individual

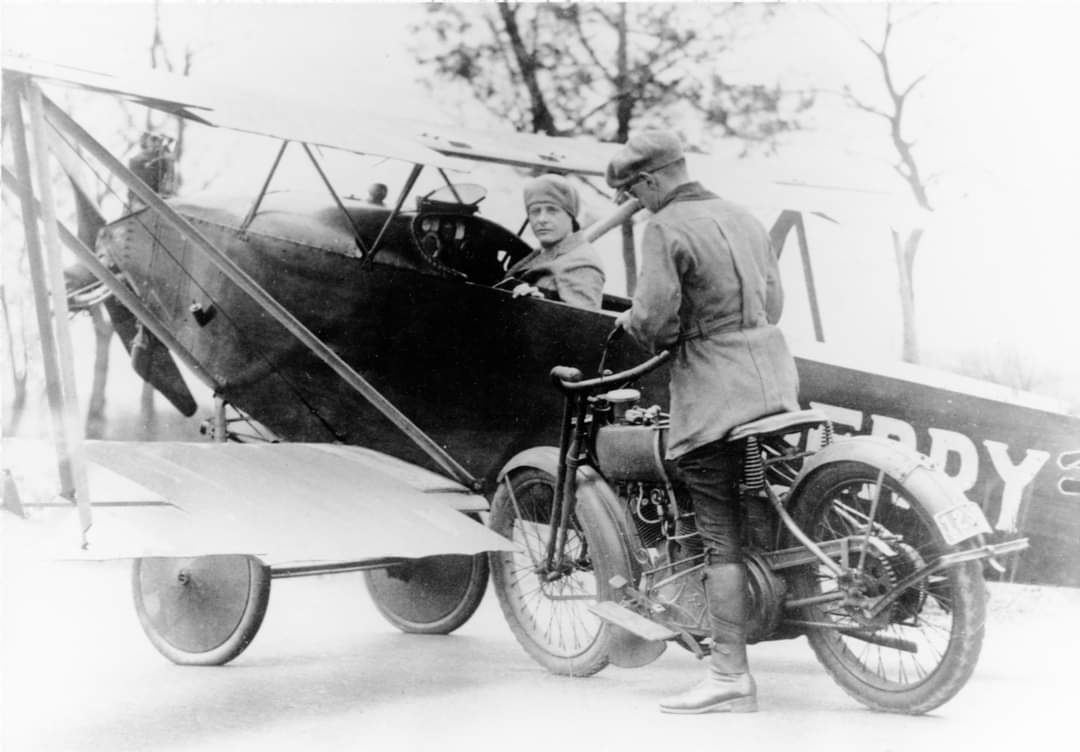
A Nassau County Deputy Sheriff giving a ticket to Lawrence Sperry after he lands his plane on the street c. 1922

The title of deputy often refers to a person given authorization to act on behalf of a higher-ranking individual in case of absences or vacancies, the title itself is oftentimes accompanied by the title or rank of their superior as is the case in 'Deputy Commissioner'. Deputies are associated with positions of authority within political, legal and executive contexts. A deputy may also refer to a person whose rank is immediately below that of the head of a department; it may furthermore be used to refer to a person who has been appointed or elected to a public office.

== Etymology ==
The term deputy comes from the word deputāre meaning 'to destine, to allot' in Late Latin and 'to esteem, to consider (as), and "literally" to cut off, prune' in the Classical Latin form. Around the middle ages the word deputāre came to refer specifically to the appointment of a person to act on behalf of another. It evolved c. 14th century to députer meaning 'to appoint, to assign' in Old French and then to deputé c. 15th century meaning 'a subordinate officer given the full power of an officer without holding the office'. The word deputy came into the English language c. 16th century and originally referred to various types of appointed officials; from high ranking officials to local assistants. The word deputy as we know it now comes from c. 1769.

== Responsibilities ==
Although deputies are themselves subordinates, they exercise authority over junior positions within the hierarchy of an organization or company. A deputy is often called upon to make decision which directly influence outcomes and policies, as such they typically possess specialized training and qualifications akin to their superior.

== Uses around the world ==
=== Canada ===
In Canada, particularly among Francophones, Members of Parliament and Members of the Legislative Assemblies are referred to as députés. Their work consists mostly of representing an electoral district as well as their political party, responding to the needs of their voters and proposing, debating on, and passing or denying different bills.

=== Communist states ===
All elected officials, bar Yugoslavia (from 1974 onwards it used the term delegates), have referred to elected representatives as deputies to the supreme state organ of power in question.

=== France ===
In France députés, or deputies in English, are elected to represent different electoral districts; they form the French National Assembly, and together with the Senators; who form the Senate, they make up the French Parliament. They, along with the senators propose, debate on and vote in favour of, or against different bills; they also hold the French Government accountable.

=== United Nations ===
Within the United Nations' senior leadership system, there are Deputy Special Representatives who are appointed by the Secretary General of the United Nations. They along with the Special Representatives represent him in meetings and during negotiations. They also assist the UN Security Council in addressing situations that threaten international peace and security.
