= Beni Territory =

Beni Wilaya ya Beni (Swahili)
- Territory
- Territoire de Beni
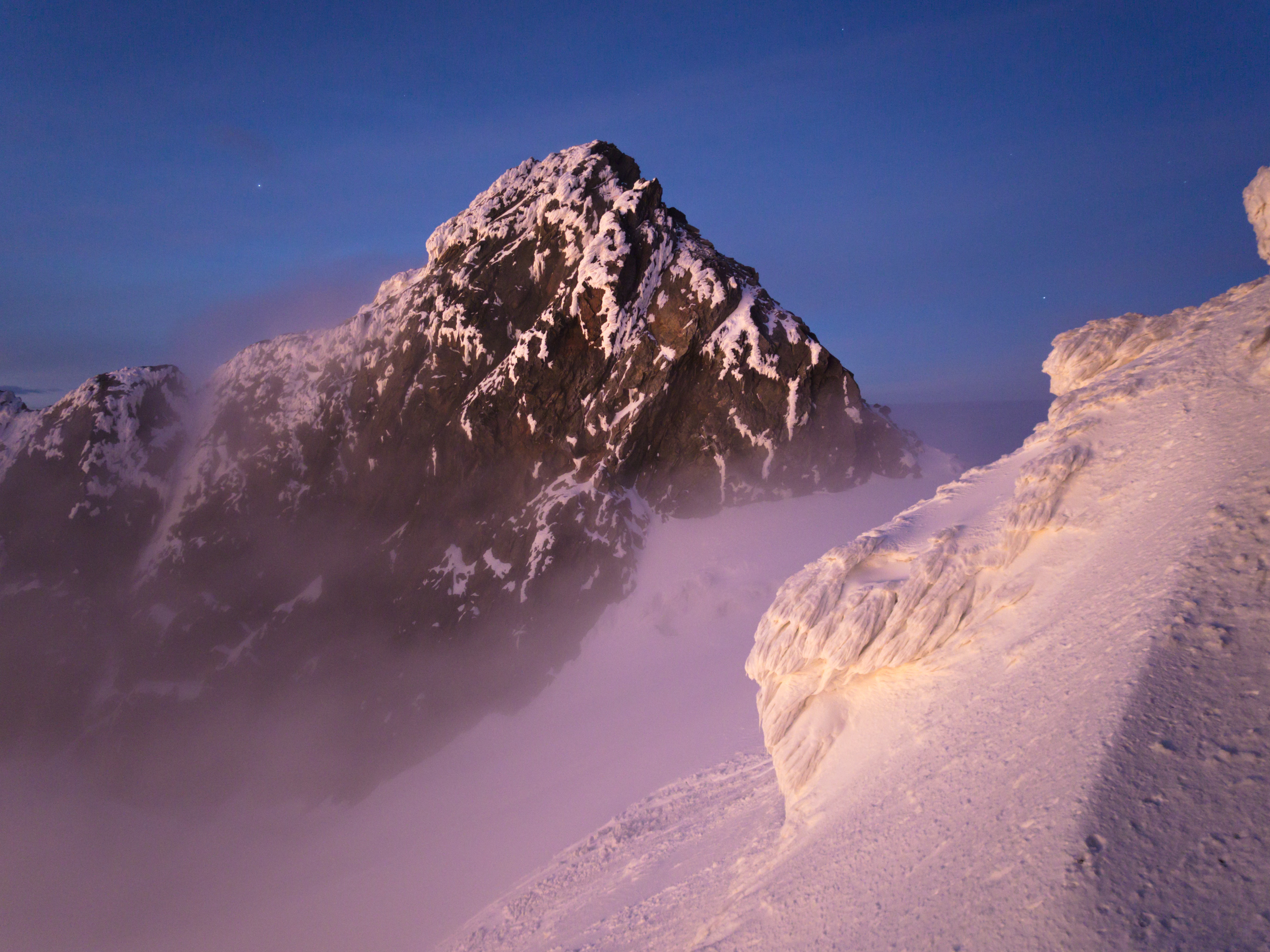
- Mount Ngaliema (Stanley)
- Interactive map of Beni
- Coordinates: 0.4833°N 29.4500°E
- Country: DR Congo
- Province: North Kivu
- HQ: Oicha
- Time zone: UTC+2 (CAT)

Beni Territory, also known as Oicha Territory, is a territory of North Kivu, Democratic Republic of the Congo. It's administrative center is the town of Oicha.

It has been the site of fighting during the Allied Democratic Forces insurgency between government troops and the ADF militia, which also crosses the border into the territory from Uganda. It was there that the Kirindera massacre, perpetrated by the ADF, happened.
