= East African Community Regional Force =

Regional peecekeeping force from the East African Community

The East African Community Regional Force (EACRF), sometimes called the EAC Force or East African Regional Force, was a regional peacekeeping force from the East African Community (EAC) deployed to the Democratic Republic of the Congo (DRC) in November 2022 to help restore peace and stability in its eastern region. The EACRF deployment was in response to rebel violence in the eastern DRC, specifically due to a major offensive from rebel group M23. Its army was composed out of troops from Burundi, Kenya, South Sudan and Uganda.

== Mandate ==
The EACRF had the following mandate:

- plan and conduct operations with the Armed Forces of the Democratic Republic of the Congo (FARDC) in the Joint Operations Area, to defeat the armed groups in the eastern DRC;
- support the FARDC in concretizing and maintenance of law and order;
- support the DRC in collaboration with humanitarian agencies to continue humanitarian relief to population affected by armed groups activities including Internally Displaced Persons (IDPs); and
- support in the Disarmament, Demobilisation, Community Recovery and Stabilisation Program (P-DDRCS).

== History ==
On 15 June 2022 Uhuru Kenyatta who was then the president of Kenya called for its deployment in the North Kivu, South KIvu and Ituri provinces to "stabilize the zone and enforce peace in support of the DRC security forces and in close coordination with MONUSCO (an UN peacekeeping force)" following the capture of strategic town Bunagana, North Kivu by M23. The government spokesman of the DRC Patrick Muyaya replied on 17 June that the DRC would not accept Rwanda to participate in the joint force due to allegations that Rwanda was supporting M23. The deployment of the EACRF was authorized by the EAC Heads of State at a summit in July 2022 and was mandated form the Treaty for the Establishment of the EAC and the EAC Protocol on Peace and Security. The mandate was originally six months long, but was extended to 8 September 2023 and then 8 December 2023.

=== Deployment ===
On 2 November 900 to nearly 1000 soldiers from the Kenya Defence Forces joined the EACRF to combat M23 in Goma, North Kivu. M23 partially gave up its position in Kibumba to this contingent on 23 December. Joining the deployment was the Uganda People's Defence Force and on 28 December 750 troops from the South Sudan People's Defence Forces. The Burundi National Defence Force joined on 5 March 2023. On March the Burundian contingent of the EACRF were deploying into Masisi Territory, North Kivu after M23 withdrew from several villages there. The final phase of the deployment came when the South Sudanese contingent arrived in Goma between 2 April and 3 April to be stationed in Nyiragongo territory and then at the Kibumba-Rumangabo axis with a Kenyan contingent.

The EACRF deployment had the effect of freezing the front lines between the FARDC and M23 from April until October 2023. The EACRF further helped in the opening of main supply routes preventing direct threat on Goma and Sake towns resulting in the gradual return of IDPs to their rural homes especially in Sake, Kirolirwe, Kitchanga and Mwesso, within Masisi territory and in Kibumba, Rumangabo, Kiwanja and Bunagana in Nyiragongo and Rutshuru territories.

There is controversy on the EACRFs handling of M23 in their deployment areas. A Kenyan contingent was deployed in Rumangabo despite M23 still being there. On March 31 an Ugandan contingent entered the DRC to eastern Bunagana in Kibaya and on 3 April the Ugandan contingent set up a base in central Bunagana, but despite their authorities declaring that they did not want to coexist with M23, the contingent were coexisting with M23 who were not yet fully withdrawn from the town. A Burundian contingent was also deployed in the Sake-Kilolirwe-Kitshanga-Mwesso axis, despite M23 still being there.

=== Departure ===
On 30 January 2023 Rwandan officers from the EACRF were expelled by the Congolese army due to a Congolese fighter jet being hit by artillery fire from Rwanda six days ago. The EAC secretary general requested for clarification and considered this action a violation of the EACRF Status of Forces Agreement. On October Patrick Muyaya said that the EACRF had to leave the DRC on 3 December due to "lack of satisfactory results on the ground" and "because it has not been able to resolve the problem, notably that of the M23" which was completed in 21 December. The EACRFs Major General commander Alphaxard Kiugu claims that it completed its mandate but that there are failures pointing to the armed groups that had returned to areas they had previously vacated, the rise in armed groups that exploited existing gaps, the propaganda against the EACRF and the slow progress of the P-DDRCS. The EACRFs mission in the DRC was replaced with the Southern African Development Communities (SADCs) mission in the DRC (SAMIDRC).

== See also ==
- East African Federation
- Burundi–Democratic Republic of the Congo relations
- Democratic Republic of the Congo–Kenya relations
- Democratic Republic of the Congo–Rwanda relations
- Democratic Republic of the Congo–Uganda relations
- United Nations Operation in the Congo
- 2023 DRC anti-MONUSCO protests
