= 2021 Mount Nyiragongo eruption =

2021 eruption of Mount Nyiragongo in the Democratic Republic of the Congo

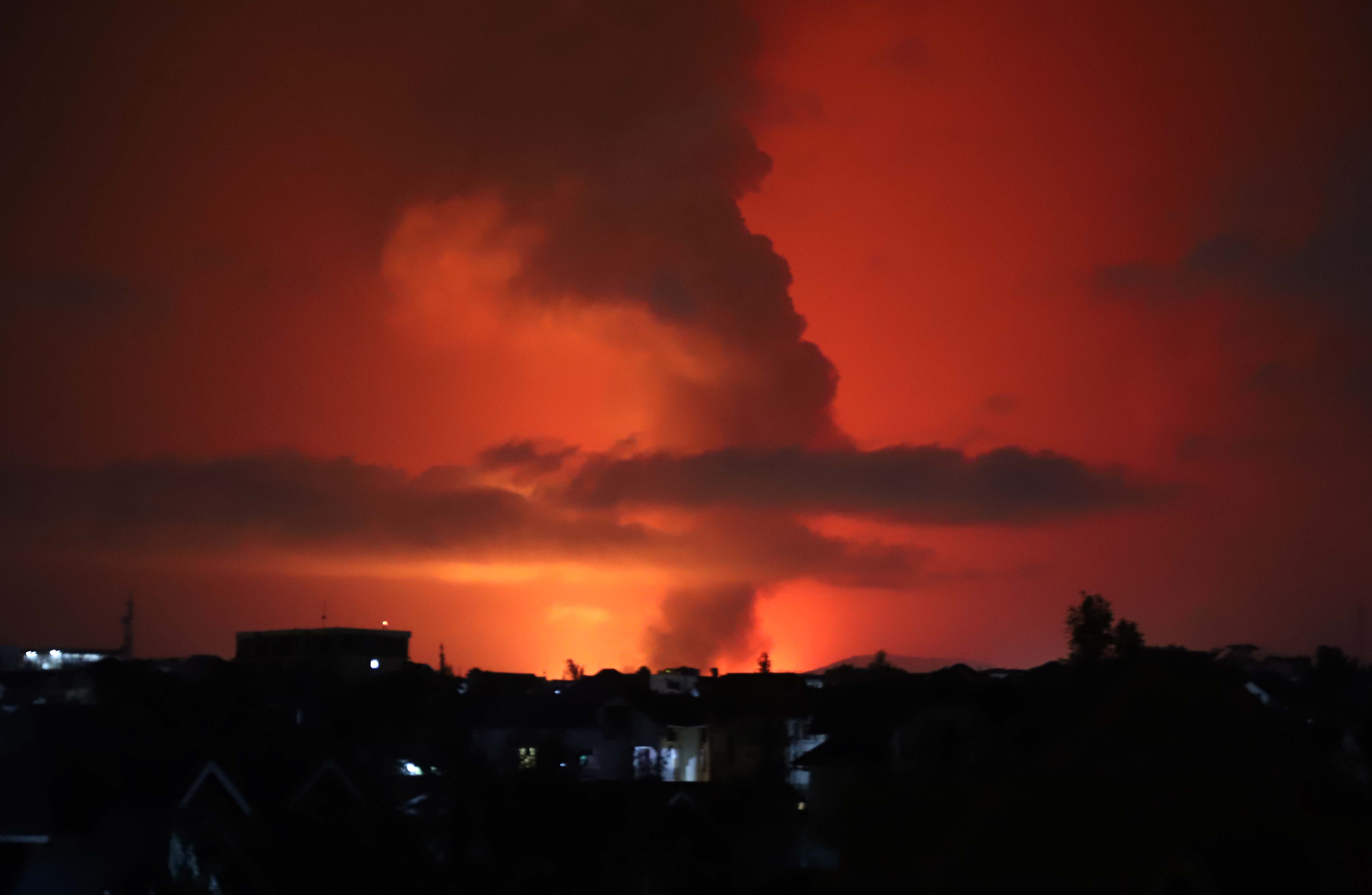
- Nyirangongo on the day of its 2021 eruption
- Volcano: Mount Nyiragongo
- Start date: 22 May 2021
- End date: 22 August 2021
- Type: Effusive
- Location: Democratic Republic of the Congo; 1°31′19″S 29°14′58″E
- Impact: 32 dead 1,000 homes destroyed

On 22 May 2021, Mount Nyiragongo in the Democratic Republic of the Congo began erupting. As of 25 May, 32 people died as a result of the eruption and 1,000 homes were destroyed.

== Background ==
According to a Virunga National Park official, the eruption of Mount Nyiragongo is similar to the eruption in 2002, which caused the death of 250 people. In September 2020, Katcho Karume, director of the Goma Volcano Observatory, said that the lava lake had been rapidly filling, increasing the risk of an eruption in the next few years, though Karume also noted that an earthquake could trigger an eruption earlier. The Observatory had not been properly functioning for almost a year before the eruption, after the World Bank cut funding following allegations of corruption. The Observatory was unable to pay for an internet connection to connect remote monitors or for fuel to regularly transport staff to the observation points; staff manually downloaded data from memory cards during their few visits to the volcano. In August 2020, a report in Geophysical Research Letters based on a comparison of historical and current activity at Nyiragongo noted the possibility of a flank eruption between March 2024 and November 2027.

== Eruption ==
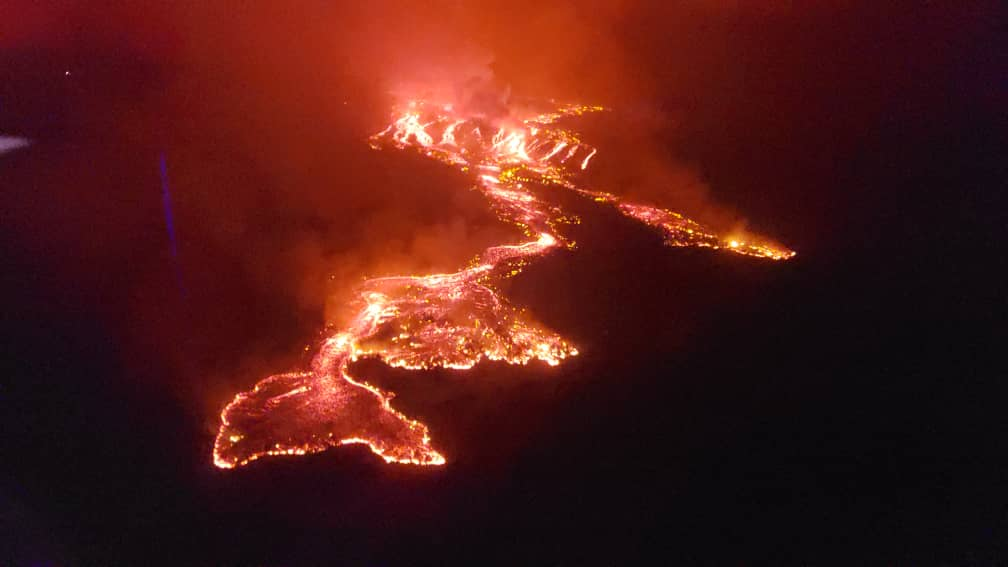
Nyiragongo's lava during 2021 eruption

28 May map of lava extent and tremors in relation to Goma

At about 6:30 p.m. (CAT) on 22 May 2021, a flank of Mount Nyiragongo erupted and lava began to flow towards the city of Goma about 20 kilometers to the south, which had a population of 2 million people. The DRC government urged residents of the city to evacuate. The lava flow was estimated to have moved at 1 kilometre per hour (0.62 mph), allowing people time to escape. The lava ultimately stopped at the Buheme district on the northern outskirts of Goma, destroying hundreds of homes and buildings in the area. Despite earlier reports that the lava had flowed into the city and even reached the Goma International Airport at the south of the city, later during the day it was confirmed that the airport and the built-up area of the city were unaffected. However, the lava flow had crossed the N2 road, cutting Goma off from the city of Beni to the north.

Around 8,000 people from Goma crossed into Rwanda for refuge. UNICEF stated that there's a possibility of evacuees returning home to discover their homes destroyed, including shortages of water and power supply. It was officially confirmed by the Rwandan authorities that over 3,000 had crossed into Rwanda from Goma, according to BBC News. Apart from those who fled to Rwanda, another 25,000 people were also said to have fled to the northwest in Sake, the UNICEF added.

On May 23, after word that the flow towards Goma had ceased, Rwanda's Emergency Management Ministry reported that refugees who had fled to Rubavu had mostly returned home. The International NGO Safety Organisation noted on May 23 that lava appeared to be flowing towards the Rwandan border and advised humanitarian workers in the northern Goma to move west for safety. DRC Communications Minister Patrick Muyaya stated that seismic tremors continued to be detected and advised vigilance and avoiding non-essential travel.

On 24 May, strong aftershocks shook the city of Goma.

On 25 May, at 11:03 a.m., a 5.3 magnitude earthquake struck in the vicinity, destroying several buildings and raising fears that new fissures in the lava lake or an eruption were forthcoming.

On 27 May, authorities ordered the evacuation of portions of Goma, leading to the departure of tens of thousands of people, due to the risk of further eruption. Constant Ndima Kongba, the military governor of North Kivu province, ordered the evacuation of nearly a third of the cities residents, in 10 districts. Ndima stated that magma detected underneath the city and nearby Lake Kivu could erupt, raising the possibility of a limnic eruption in the lake. While residents of Goma fled across the Rwandan border to Gisenyi, some residents of Gisenyi fled east after being shook by repeated tremors, the largest of which was 4.9. Tremors were felt as far away as Kigali, the capital of Rwanda, 90 kilometres (56 mi) away.

On 7 June, after seismic activity subsided, the Congolese government announced they will start a phased return of residents who evacuated from the city.

== Casualties and damage ==
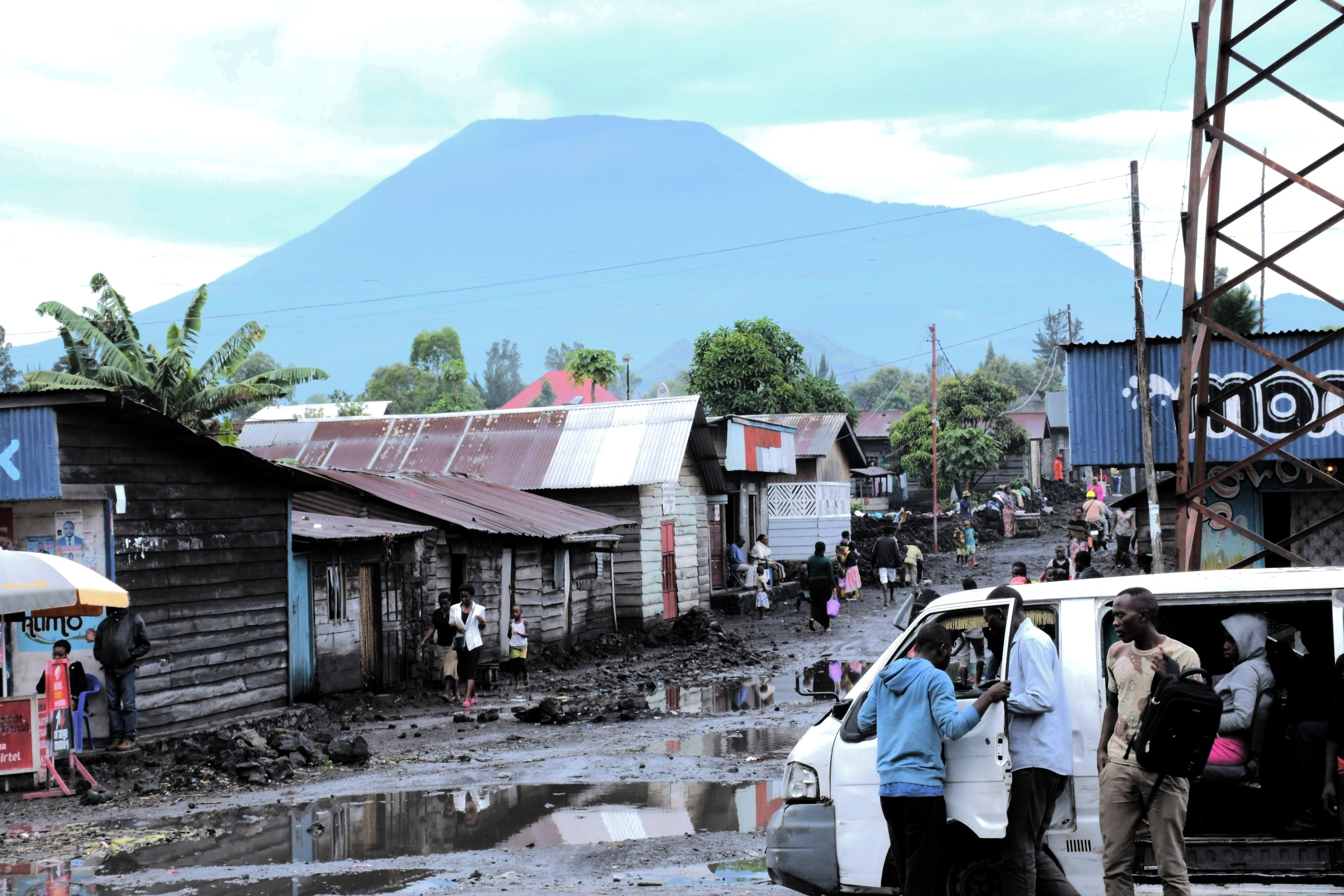
Street in Goma with Nyiragongo in background, 2019

Government spokesman Patrick Muyaya stated on the night of May 23 that fifteen people had died: two who had burned to death; nine in a traffic accident while fleeing; and four prisoners killed while attempting to break out of Camp Munzenze prison in Goma. UNICEF reported more than 170 children as missing, and 150 children as separated from their families. On 24 May, five additional bodies of asphyxiated victims were found, bringing the toll to 20. The death toll later rose to 32, as some of the victims died on May 24 after inhaling smoke and toxic gas while walking on a section of cooled lava. The announcement was made by Patrick Muyaya, government spokesman, as he revealed the possibility of a rise in the numbers while the search for missing people continues.

The Norwegian Refugee Council reported that six hundred homes and five schools had been destroyed. Seventeen villages around the volcano reported damage, though the flow stopped just outside of Goma.

According to the UN, as of 25 May, 1,000 homes were destroyed with 17 villages being wrecked.

On 28 May, authorities announced the forced evacuation of around 400,000 people from Goma due to the eruption. The evacuation comes amidst a "state of siege" previously declared by President Félix Tshisekedi due to insurgent activity in the region.

== Observatory criticism ==
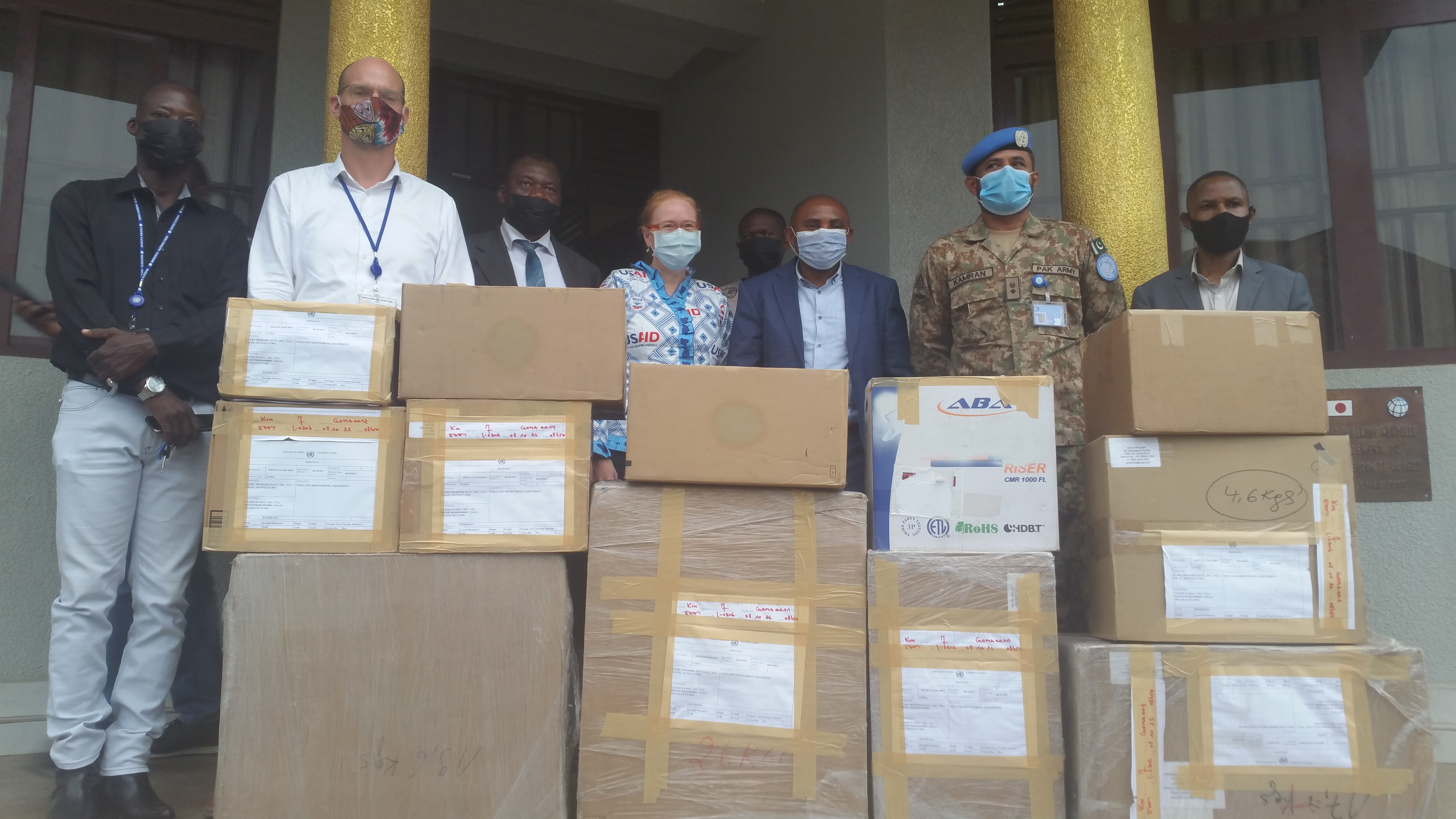
Goma Volcanological Observatory equipment arriving in 2021 donated by the US Geological Survey.

Residents blamed the Goma Volcano Observatory for not providing warning of the eruption. The World Bank had eliminated funding for the scientists performing the observation in 2020, and the observatory had stopped monitoring the volcano a few months later. On May 10, 2021, the observatory had issued a warning that seismic activity at Nyiragongo had increased, and had previously warned that the volcano's lava lake was filling up, increasing the chances of an eruption or earthquake-related disaster. According to the scientific director of the Volcanic Observatory of Goma, Celestin Kasereka Mahinda, shortage of funding was the reason that made it difficult for the scientists at the Observatory to caution the public on the eruption. Mahinda also advised the people of Goma to avoid going to places that have been hit by the lava from the volcano, thereby refraining from traveling unnecessarily, because the lavas are harmful and toxic.

== Aftermath ==
As of 22 August 2021, life has returned mostly to normal in Goma. Authorities are considering relocating parts of the city to the town of Sake due to the threats from the volcano and Lake Kivu. However, a relocation project would be expensive and convincing the long-time residents to relocate is expected to be difficult.
