= 2018 Yumbi massacre =

Massacre in Democratic Republic of the Congo

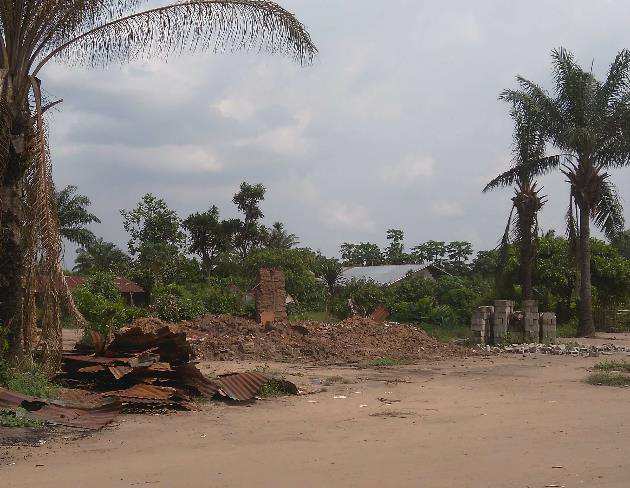
- Destroyed buildings in Yumbi after the attack
- Location: 1.9077°S 16.5614°E; Yumbi and three nearby villages, Mai-Ndombe Province, Congo-Kinshasa
- Date: 16–18 December 2018
- Target: residents
- Deaths: +890

Between December 16 and 18, 2018, at least 890 people, mostly Banunus, were killed in Yumbi and three other nearby villages (Bongende, Nkolo and Camp Nbanzi) in Mai-Ndombe Province, 400 km (250 miles) north of Kinshasa. Some 465 houses and buildings were burned down or pillaged, including some public facilities. Bongende fishing village was worst hit, with many residents mutilated and at least 339 slain. About 16,000 Banunu people were displaced from Yumbi territory, as reported by the UNHCR. About 100 Banunus found refuge on Moniende island in the Congo River, while the remainder fled to Makotimpoko District in the Republic of Congo.

The Banunus were slaughtered by members of the Batende community in a deep-rooted rivalry over monthly tribal duties, land, fields and water resources. Military-style tactics were employed in the bloodbath, and some assailants were clothed in army uniforms. Local authorities and elements within the security forces were suspected of lending them support. Both the OHCHR and national judicial authorities, have launched investigations into the reported attacks. Reports suggest the clashes started when members of the Banunu tribe wanted to bury one of their traditional chiefs on Batende land.
