= Makutano =

Makutano may refer to:

- Makutano, West Pokot, Kenya, a town in West Pokot County, Kenya
- Makutano, Kirinyaga, Kenya, a town in Kirinyaga County and Embu County, Kenya
- Makutano, a village in the Democratic Republic of the Congo; see Makutano massacre
