= 2025 Goma offensive =

M23 campaign in the DR Congo

- Part of the M23 campaign
Date	23–30 January 2025; (1 week)
Location	Goma, Democratic Republic of the Congo 01°40′46″S 29°14′01″E
Result	M23 victory: M23 rebels capture Goma; M23 declares a unilateral ceasefire; Beginning of riots in Kinshasa

Belligerents
Congo River Alliance: March 23 Movement; Rwanda	DR Congo; SADC; United Nations

Commanders and leaders
Corneille Nangaa	(Democratic Republic of the Congo) Peter Cirimwami Nkuba †

Units involved
M23 forces; Rwanda Defence Force	FARDC; 3rd Defence Zone; 34th military region; Congolese National Police; SADC; SADC Standby Brigade; SAMIDRC; MONUSCO; Force Intervention Brigade; "Wazalendo" militia; Romanian mercenaries

Strength
Total unknown; 4,000–7,000 Rwandan soldiers	Total unknown

Casualties and losses
Unknown	(Democratic Republic of the Congo) 2,000+ soldiers and police surrendered; 20 peacekeepers killed (Note: Among the peacekeepers killed included 14 South Africans, 3 Malawians, 2 Tanzanians, and 1 Uruguayan.); (Romania) 2 mercenaries killed and 280+ captured
- Total: 2,900 killed and 2,900 wounded

The 2025 Goma offensive was a military operation launched by the March 23 Movement (M23), a Congolese rebel group that is part of the Congo River Alliance (AFC) and is supported by Rwanda, against the regional capital of Goma in the Democratic Republic of the Congo (DRC). It lasted from January 23 to January 30, 2025. The campaign was part of the larger M23 campaign in the North and South Kivu provinces of the DRC, which resumed in October 2024 after a pause. During January 2025 the M23 rebels made a rapid advance in the Kivu region, cutting off the road connections to the North Kivu provincial capital of Goma by January 23 and arriving in the city on January 25.

The military of the Democratic Republic of the Congo (FARDC), assisted by United Nations and SADC peacekeepers, and the Wazalendo pro-government militias, prepared a defensive line in northern Goma. The initial M23 attack on January 25 was held back, but the next day the group's forces broke through and entered the city. Fighting occurred throughout Goma on January 27, with M23 reaching the city center, though it remained contested. The FARDC continued to hold Goma International Airport, which became the largest holdout, and several other strategic locations. The airport was captured on January 28 when the Congolese soldiers there surrendered. As of January 29, M23 controlled most of the city, but sporadic fighting continued on the outskirts, especially in northern Goma. Congolese government forces were still resisting in the outskirts of northern Goma as of January 30, though later that day most of the fighting stopped.

Rwanda, which is widely reported to be supporting M23 with soldiers and weapons, was, as a result, ordered on January 24 to cease all diplomatic and consular activities in the DRC and leave Kinshasa, the DRC's capital. The DRC also recalled its diplomats from Rwanda. UN sources estimated that between 500 and 1,000 Rwandan troops assisted M23 in the Goma area. On January 27, the Congolese and Rwandan soldiers exchanged fire across the border near Goma.

The fall of the city has been the largest escalation in the Kivu conflict since the M23 briefly occupied Goma in 2012 and has created concerns that the M23 conflict could turn into a larger regional war due to the presence of troops from Rwanda and Burundi in the Kivu provinces. Congolese president Félix Tshisekedi called for a national mobilization, and the deputy prime minister for defense Guy Kabombo Muadiamvita said that there will be no negotiations with M23. The leader of the rebel coalition, Corneille Nangaa, said that the group intends to continue all the way to the national capital Kinshasa.

== Background ==
Goma has a population of around two million and is the provincial capital of North Kivu in the eastern Democratic Republic of the Congo (DRC), being the largest city in the province. The Rwandan-backed rebel group March 23 Movement (M23), as part of their military offensive which has been ongoing since 2022, seized large amounts of territory in both the North and South Kivu provinces throughout January 2025. The amount of territory being seized and the speed of which it was happening prompted the United Nations (UN) to warn the offensive could lead to a larger regional war. Rwanda officially denies aiding the rebel group with troops and weapons, although intelligence suggests that Rwanda is supporting M23. A United Nations report in 2024 noted that Rwanda's military assistance had been "critical" to M23's campaign. The M23 movement, which originated in 2009 from militiamen formerly aligned with the Congolese army, briefly occupied Goma for several days during its 2012 campaign before withdrawing from the city because of international pressure on Rwanda. The group was defeated militarily in 2013 with the assistance of the UN's Force Intervention Brigade and lost most of its territory in the eastern DRC before having a resurgence in 2022.

The Congolese government has described M23 as a terrorist organization that is used by Rwanda to exploit mineral resources in the eastern DRC and refused to negotiate with its leaders directly, as Rwandan president Paul Kagame and his government had insisted in December 2024 and January 2025. In December 2024, the Congolese government also filed a lawsuit in a European court against the company Apple, accusing it of using illegally mined minerals from Congo to make electronics. Coltan, which is used to make components in smartphones and laptops, is present in large quantities in the eastern DRC, and the conflict there has been described for years as being driven by the desire to secure this resource. Over the previous two decades UN investigators accused other countries, particularly Rwanda, of funding militia groups in the country, notably including the March 23 Movement. According to the UN, between April and December 2024 the M23 rebel group has made $800 million in revenue related to coltan mining. M23 illegally exports coltan and other minerals through Rwanda.

M23 and Rwandan president Paul Kagame claim that the group represents the interests of Tutsis, an ethnic minority in the DRC, which had previously been the target of the Rwandan Genocide in 1994. Rwanda's government also noted that during the Kivu conflict in eastern Congo the Congolese military has worked with the FDLR, an ethnic Hutu militia whose members had committed the 1994 genocide in Rwanda against Tutsis and moderate Hutus. M23 has stated previously that its goal is to fight the FDLR. However, this claim has been subject to significant scrutiny. Critics argue that M23 and Rwanda have used the presence of the FDLR as a pretext for pursuing broader political and economic ambitions in the region, particularly given that the FDLR no longer poses a substantial threat to Rwanda. Congolese politician Corneille Nangaa, formerly the head of the country's electoral commission, declared his opposition to the administration of President Félix Tshisekedi in 2023 over political disagreements related to his 2018 election and formed a coalition of rebel forces known as the Congo River Alliance (Alliance Fleuve Congo; AFC), which includes M23. The coalition was established at a meeting in the Kenyan capital Nairobi in August 2023, consisting of multiple political parties and armed groups, most notably M23.

Negotiations mediated by Angola between the DRC and Rwanda led to the signing of a ceasefire agreement in August 2024, but the deal broke down as fighting resumed with M23 on 20 October 2024. Known as the Luanda process, the Angolan-mediated talks had the support of the European Union and the United States, but a planned summit between Presidents Tshisekedi and Kagame on 15 December, aimed at discussing the neutralization of the FDLR, was canceled after Rwanda's delegation refused to attend. This refusal raised suspicions that Rwanda's actions in the DRC were motivated more by economic interests, particularly in the Kivu region's mineral wealth, rather than genuine security concerns. Tshisekedi refused the Rwandan demand that his government negotiates directly with M23. That month the fighting in the Kivu region between Congolese security forces and M23 escalated.

On January 21, the provincial governor of the South Kivu providence, Jean-Jacques Purusi, confirmed the capture of the mining towns of Minova, Lumbishi, Numbi, and Shanje in South Kivu, and Bweremana in North Kivu; Minova previously served as a key supply route into Goma from South Kivu. Additionally, these advances by M23 extended their control over more territory with coltan, cassiterite, and gold. The fighting in the eastern DRC since the start of 2025 caused 400,000 people to be displaced in North and South Kivu. Among these, 34,000 went to already overcrowded refugee camps in and outside of Goma.

== Offensive ==
=== January 23–25: Initial advance to Goma ===
M23 captured Sake, a town and critical road junction west of Goma that connected the city to the rest of country, from the Congolese armed forces (FARDC) on January 23. This allowed them to cut off its main supply line and removed the last FARDC stronghold before Goma. The Rwandan-backed group also controlled territory to the north, and began its offensive against the city itself on the same day. The quick success of the operation to cut off Goma indicated that FARDC morale and defenses in the region were breaking, causing fears of an impending fall of Goma, and Congolese president Félix Tshisekedi returned from his foreign trip early. An official statement from M23 on January 24 said that the group will "liberate our compatriots in Goma." One Tanzanian peacekeeper was killed in Sake.

On January 24, the DRC officially severed diplomatic ties with Rwanda as the fighting escalted, with two South African peacekeepers being killed and allegedly a Rwandan sniper killing Peter Cirimwami Nkuba, the military governor of the North Kivu province, on the front line. Rwandan officials were demanded to cease all diplomatic and consular activities as well as leave Kinshasa, the capital of the DRC, within 48 hours. Rwanda evacuated its only diplomat in the Congolese capital, and the DRC also recalled all of its diplomatic staff from Rwanda. The Congolese foreign minister, Thérèse Kayikwamba Wagner, described Rwanda's military support for M23 a "declaration of war."

Congolese military spokesman General Sylvian Ekenge told the press on January 25 that "Rwanda is determined to seize the city of Goma". As the rebel group approached the city, the Rwandan army amassed troops along its border with the DRC and its senior commanders arrived in Gisenyi, a Rwandan city less than a mile away from the border. Some Rwandan troops crossed onto the Congolese side to assist M23, reportedly intending to capture Goma before the UN Security Council meeting planned for the following day. UN sources have reported that the Rwanda Defence Force (RDF) has de facto operational control over M23.

=== January 25–30: Battle in the city ===
Early in the morning of January 25, M23 advanced on the outskirts of Goma alongside heavy bombardments, but advances were reportedly pushed back by DRC forces. On the outskirts of the city, hundreds of thousands of civilians were displaced, especially due to the bombardments. M23 closed the airspace around Goma International Airport. Order in the city itself had reportedly not broken down, with a heavy police presence since the beginning of the offensive. The Congolese armed forces (FARDC) set up a defensive line in the northern part of the city and the Birere area, including tanks, and are assisted by Romanian mercenaries and the "Wazalendo" local pro-government militia. A Romanian private military company had been hired by the government to provide training for the Congolese army, and was also used to guard important locations outside Goma. The FARDC fought off the initial M23 attack on January 25. One Uruguayan peacekeeper was killed.

By the evening of January 26, the rebels were reported to have pushed through the Munigi neighborhood, 9 kilometres (5.6 mi) from the Goma city center, which was defended by the FARDC and foreign peacekeeping forces. M23 claimed that the city was under their control. Thirteen peacekeepers from the Southern African Development Community (SADC) and the UN were initially reported killed in the fighting over the previous days; among the dead were seven South Africans and three Malawians from the SADC mission in the DRC, and two South Africans and one Uruguayan from MONUSCO. It was later determined that twenty peacekeepers had been killed during the Goma offensive, including fourteen South Africans and two Tanzanians.

The city was cut off from electricity. Bintou Keita, UN special representative in Congo, told the Security Council that M23 were using civilians as human shields. According to rebel leader Corneille Nangaa, after negotiations with some government troops M23 allowed army officers to leave Goma by boat across Lake Kivu for Bukavu, in the South Kivu province. To avoid the fighting in the outskirts of Goma some 300,000 people living in the refugee camps there entered the city itself.

On January 27, M23 claimed the capture of the city. However, fighting continued in several parts and "tens of thousands" of people were displaced. The city's jail with 3,000 inmates was "literally torched" and the jailbreak resulted in fatalities. More than 4,000 prisoners escaped from Muzenze prison. It was reported that hundreds of female inmates were raped and burned alive during the mass jailbreak from Goma's prison. Rebel fighters reached the center of Goma that morning. A spokesman for the rebel coalition claimed that Congolese army soldiers were surrendering, though the army did not comment. According to Uruguayan peacekeepers, 100 Congolese soldiers surrendered and handed over their weapons at the MONUSCO base as the rebels had demanded, while 26 Congolese troops and one police officer surrendered to Rwandan border guards near Goma. Some Congolese soldiers changed out of their uniforms and surrendered at the Rwandan border or took refuge in the peacekeeping bases.

The government claimed later that morning that its troops are still holding the Goma International Airport and other key points in the city. Agence France Press reported that the Congolese army and its allied militias put up "unexpected resistance" against better equipped and trained Rwandan and Rwandan-backed rebel forces, during intense fighting in the city center and western Goma, although some deserted and abandoned their uniforms. Congolese soldiers and militiamen had also been involved in looting, along with part of the civilian population. Looting was reported in Birere, Majengo, and near the airport. The FARDC and the Rwandan forces on the other side of the border also exchanged artillery fire, with Congolese troops on Mount Goma, a hill in the city, firing at the Rwandan town of Gisenyi.

As of the evening of January 27, the FARDC and Wazalendo militia still held some parts of the city, according to president of the National Assembly Vital Kamerhe. Combat was taking place near the airport and surrounding areas. Electricity and water have been shut off since the start of the fighting. An emergency meeting of the government was held by President Félix Tshisekedi. At least 17 people were reported killed during the fighting in Goma, while 367 others were injured. Additionally, five people were killed while 25 others were injured in the neighboring city of Gisenyi, across the border in Rwanda, in an incident related to the fighting.

Fighting for the control of Goma was still ongoing as of early January 28. FARDC units were present in the city center, where the situation was unclear because of continuing combat, while M23 appeared to control western parts. The airport has become the largest pocket of government troops in the city. According to a Congolese government minister, the FARDC controlled 80 percent of Goma, while the rebels and Rwandan troops have been pushed to the outskirts of the city. That morning, a group of foreign officials (with assistance from an American scientist and pilot) managed to acquire and fly an aircraft out of Goma International Airport ahead of the facility's capture later in the day, where over 1,200 Congolese soldiers at the airport surrendered, allowing M23 to take control of it. The surrendered Congolese soldiers were sent to the MONUSCO base, held by the Uruguayan battalion, and which is also used to shelter civilians. South Africa confirmed that another four South African National Defence Force soldiers in MONUSCO had been killed. The deputy head of MONUSCO also reported that the fighting has caused civilian casualties and the displacement of the city's population. The main hospital in Goma, run by the International Committee of the Red Cross, set up tents in the courtyard to treat more wounded, and all medical facilities were operating at double their capacity. Food was stolen as warehouses and stores were looted.

After the capture of the Goma International Airport by M23, fighting continued in other parts of the city, with remaining FARDC troops and Wazalendo militiamen. Civilian casualties were reported to be at over 100 killed and 1,000 wounded. That evening, Tshisekedi appointed Brigadier General Evariste Somo as military governor of North Kivu and promoted him to the rank of major general, succeeding Peter Cirimwami who had been killed several days earlier.

Most of the city was controlled by M23 as of early January 29, and the fighting appeared to have slowed down. M23 consolidated its control including the city center, with remaining resistance having been pushed to the outskirts. The rebel group announced the intention to establish its own administration in the city. Thousands of civilians fled to the border with Rwanda as the humanitarian crisis in Goma worsened. About 280 Romanian mercenaries hired by the DRC who had surrendered left the country via Rwanda, after being taken into custody by the Rwanda Defense Force. Captured Congolese FARDC soldiers and Wazalendo militiamen were disarmed by M23 at a local stadium. Holdouts continued to fight in the northern neighborhoods of Goma, including Kasika, Katoyi, Majengo, Turunga, and Kibwe.

On January 30, the remaining FARDC and Wazalendo troops that had not surrendered continued to fight against M23 in the northern Goma area, especially in the Turunga village of the Munigi groupement, where heavy and light weapon use was reported. Later that day the fighting in Goma had mostly stopped, including in the northern area.

== Aftermath ==
Report from the Voice of America showing displaced residents returning, in February 2025 (in French).

With the fall of Goma nearly all of North Kivu is under M23 control. As M23 captured most of the city, the rebel group's forces in the South Kivu province along the western shore of Lake Kivu began an offensive in the direction of the provincial capital Bukavu, about 125 miles (201 km) away from Goma, on January 29. A senior Rwandan diplomat said that the rebel coalition will continue its offensive against the Congolese government. Panic among Bukavu's residents was reported on January 30 amid the news of the rebel advance in South Kivu, while troops departed the FARDC bases there to go to the front line further north. The FARDC set up defenses along the road connecting the two cities and hundreds of residents in Bukavu volunteered to enlist in the military.

On January 30, electricity and telecommunications were restored to parts of Goma by M23, which also prepared hundreds of administrators to run the city, and crossings at the nearby Rwandan border were reopened. Some traffic resumed on the city's roads, and the roads that connect Goma to the towns of Sake, Minova, and Masisi, were reportedly reopened.

The United Nations World Food Programme reported a food shortage, made worse by continuing power and water outages and the closure of the Goma airport. Medical facilities in both Goma and Bukavu were overwhelmed by the large number of gunshot victims and by shortages of supplies. At least 700,000 people had been displaced in the Kivu region.

On January 31, FARDC major general Evariste Somo took office as governor of North Kivu in a ceremony in Beni, one of the towns in the province that is not controlled by rebels. He also announced that the provincial capital has been temporarily moved from Goma to Beni due to the Rwandan-backed M23 takeover. Since the start of the Goma offensive, attacks in the area of Beni by another group, the Allied Democratic Forces militia, have also increased. Nearly a week later, following the M23's consolidation over Goma, the AFC announced a new regional administration in North Kivu, stating there was "a need and urgency to organize the territorial administration in the Democratic Republic of Congo", which would bring about stability and organisation in the province. In addition, claims of a forced recruitment process occurring in Goma by the M23 were made, which were firmly denied by the AFC.

== Analysis ==
The fall of Goma represents the biggest escalation in the Kivu conflict since the brief occupation of it by M23 in 2012 and has led the current M23 offensive to be compared to the First and Second Congo Wars of the 1990s and early 2000s. These earlier conflicts, which also originated in the eastern DRC, saw Goma as a significant epicenter. The M23 movement, which claims to represent the Tutsi Banyamulenge community in the region, has historical ties to the Tutsi population of Rwanda. Rebel groups, including those backed by Rwanda and Uganda, recruited heavily from the Banyamulenge due to their shared ethnic identity and grievances with the Congolese government.

Political analyst Jason Stearns noted that while ethnic tensions and violence against Banyamulenge have existed for some time, these tensions did not significantly escalate before the resurgence of M23 in 2021. Instead, the group's return exacerbated communal divisions, as M23 expanded its goals beyond combating the FDLR to aiming for the overthrow of the Congolese government. M23 and Rwanda have faced criticism for using the FDLR's presence, which is no longer a direct threat to Rwanda, as a pretext for their actions in the DRC. In particular, the refusal of Rwandan President Paul Kagame to attend the Luanda Summit in December 2024, which was meant to discuss a plan to neutralize the FDLR, raised suspicions that Rwanda's motivations might be driven more by economic interests than security concerns. Political scientist Bob Kabamba of the University of Liège emphasized that economic factors have always played a key role in Rwanda's involvement in the region, tracing this back to Rwanda's participation in the First Congo War in 1996, when Rwanda claimed to be defending the Banyamulenge community but was also involved in looting and human rights violations—a pattern that continues with the resurgence of M23 in 2021.

Unlike in 2012, the M23 appears to be larger and better trained and equipped, more like a professional army rather than a ragtag militia. Prior to the capture of Goma by M23 and AFC, the rebel coalition has created a state-like political administration in the territories that they have taken control of, which included police and intelligence services, regulations and taxes for the mining industry, and efforts at ideological indoctrination. Foreign Policy wrote that if M23 went on to capture Bukavu it would be an even more significant victory because no rebel group had taken that city in decades. Thousands of soldiers had been deployed to assist the FARDC in South Kivu by Burundi, which has a Hutu-dominated government and previously accused Rwanda of backing a 2015 coup attempt, adding to concern for the potential of a larger regional war.

=== Rwandan role ===
The Africa Center of Strategic Studies noted that Rwanda, the backer of the rebel movement, also has aligned itself more closely with the international community, which could prevent the kind of pressure that it faced in 2012. Rwanda has become the second largest contributor of peacekeepers for United Nations missions and a significant exporter of several minerals that are mined in eastern Congo by M23, which have been identified by the United States as critical for the manufacture of components in electronics. Rwanda's export of minerals, including those from Congo, has generated over $1 billion in revenue in the previous two years, according to former UN investigator Jason Stearns. The Institute for the Study of War wrote that Rwanda is in a better position to deter potential Western sanctions.

The United Nations Group of Experts reported extensive and systematic Rwandan military involvement in support of M23 during the captures of Goma and Bukavu. The findings, submitted to the United Nations Security Council in May and made public on 2 July 2025, revealed that at least 6,000 Rwandan soldiers were deployed on Congolese territory to bolster M23 operations in North and South Kivu. Rwandan support extended beyond troop deployment to include military training provided in Rwandan-based camps, logistical backing, and the supply of sophisticated weaponry. This included Turkish-manufactured Bayraktar TB2 armed drones, Chinese short range air defense missile systems, and electronic warfare equipment such as jamming devices. Notably, these assets were reportedly used in the destruction of a MONUSCO armored vehicle near Sake on 25 January, an incident the United Nations characterized as a direct provocation against its peacekeeping mission. The report also attributed a deadly missile strike, which resulted in the death of one UN peacekeeper and the injury of four others, to a Rwandan military position rather than merely acting through a proxy force. As of April 2025, when the report was finalized, between 1,000 and 1,500 Rwandan troops remained active in M23-controlled areas, with several thousand more positioned along the Rwandan-Congolese border for potential deployment.

Following the breakdown of the Luanda-led peace process, Rwandan and M23 forces launched coordinated offensives beginning on 4 January 2025 that captured Masisi-Centre in North Kivu and subsequently Minova in South Kivu, which facilitated their approach toward Goma. On 22 January, RDF units seized the Bulenga Peninsula, an important military vantage point from which they launched sustained bombardments on Sake and Mubambiro, strategic sites held by the Congolese army, the Southern African Development Community's Mission in the DRC (SAMIDRC), and MONUSCO. These attacks prompted the withdrawal of Congolese troops and allied militias. The report identified several high-ranking Rwandan officials as key figures in these operations, including James Kabarebe (Rwanda's Minister of Regional Cooperation and former RDF Chief of Staff), General Vincent Nyakarundi (RDF Chief of Staff), and General Patrick Karuretwa (President of Rwanda's High Military Court). The RDF was reported to have operated from a command headquarters in Gisenyi, directly across the border from Goma, not intending to counter the FDLR (as officially claimed by Rwanda), but rather to facilitate territorial expansion and secure mineral and agricultural resources as well as project political influence within the DRC.

Following the seizure of Goma, a partial withdrawal of Rwandan forces was observed, though others were redeployed to Bukavu to support continued military operations. The investigation also cited extensive recruitment efforts by M23 (which targets former FARDC soldiers, Wazalendo fighters, ex-Rwandan troops, and diaspora members), through voluntary enlistment and coercion. The scale and coordination of operations led the U.N. panel to conclude that Rwanda exercised strategic command and control over M23. This was especially evident in M23's April 2025 withdrawal from the mineral-rich Walikale Territory, located west of Goma. The retreat, reportedly ordered by Kigali, accentuated Rwanda's decisive role in dictating rebel strategy, including decisions on territorial occupation and relinquishment.

== Reactions ==
=== Domestic ===
The Congolese government rejected an offer by Turkish president Recep Tayyip Erdoğan to mediate between it and Rwanda on January 25, with the Congolese vice foreign minister saying that the DRC is "focusing on African solutions to African problems." On January 27 it stated that its army is "more than determined to defend the homeland at the cost of the supreme sacrifice," and also that Rwandan soldiers are present in Goma. On the same day, DRC president Félix Tshisekedi agreed to attend a peace summit hosted by Kenya. Earlier, Congo's foreign minister described M23's attack on Goma as a "declaration of war" by Rwanda. On January 28 the FARDC issued a statement that it is still "fully committed to restoring the authority of the State, neutralizing armed groups and ensuring the protection of the population."

It was later confirmed Tshisekedi would not be attending the peace summit with Rwanda planned for January 29, and he was not present at the virtual meeting that was held. Instead, he planned to give his first televised address to the nation that evening. In his address Tshisekedi vowed to give a "vigorous and coordinated response," accused Rwanda of violating "the principle of the Charter of the United Nations" by sending "thousands" of troops onto Congolese soil, and called for a national mobilization by the state and society to support the war effort, encouraging young people to enlist in the FARDC "massively." He also described M23 as "puppets" of Rwanda and said that the international community's response to the conflict "borders on complicity." This was his first public comment on the situation since the start of the battle in Goma. On January 30, Deputy Prime Minister for National Defense and Veterans Guy Kabombo Muadiamvita said in a speech addressed to the troops that there will be no negotiations with M23 and called on the army to fulfill its constitutional mission to defend the borders of the country.

The March 23 Movement told all of the FARDC defending the city to lay down their arms and surrender to avoid any bloodshed. Corneille Nangaa, leader of the Congo River Alliance that includes M23, claimed on January 27 that their ultimate target is Kinshasa and implied that they want to overthrow the Congolese government. On January 29, a spokesman for the Congo River Alliance said that the situation in Goma was "very calm" despite ongoing "tensions." After the capture of the city, on January 30 Corneille Nangaa told the press that M23 will administer Goma, facilitate humanitarian aid for the population, and intends to continue its campaign on to the national capital Kinshasa, which is 2,600 kilometres (1,600 mi) to the west, to "take power and lead the country." He also said that the rebel coalition is willing to negotiate with the government.

After the start of the offensive demonstrations took place in other parts of the country to show support for the Congolese military and opposition to M23, notably in Kinshasa; Bukavu, South Kivu Province; and Kikwit, Kwilu Province. Congolese government officials in at least six of the 26 provinces of the DRC encouraged people to protest against Rwanda.

The rally in support of the FARDC fighting in the east and in protest of Rwandan aggression in Kinshasa started on January 27 and continued the next day. Police were deployed to protect foreign embassies as the situation escalated into riots. The French embassy was set on fire by protesters, while the Rwandan, French, Belgian and U.S. embassies are also attacked. The Congolese demonstrators see Western countries as the main source of foreign aid money to Rwanda and believe that the international community has not taken enough action to pressure the Rwandan government.

=== International ===
The United Nations accused Rwanda of supporting the M23 rebels with troops and weapons. On January 25, non-essential staff stationed in the city began relocating because of the deteriorating military situation on the city's outskirts. On the same day UN Secretary General António Guterres called for Rwanda to remove its troops from Congo and end its support for M23. The deputy head of MONUSCO, Vivian van de Perre, said on January 28 that the Angolan-mediated peace process needed to be restarted to "avert the looming threat of a third Congo war]." The African Union Peace and Security Council held an emergency meeting on January 28, where it focused on the need to obtain a ceasefire.

The heads of state of both Rwanda and the DRC agreed to attend a peace summit hosted by Kenya at the invitation of President William Ruto. The emergency meeting, involving all East African Community member states, was held on January 29 with Kagame but not Tshisekedi, who cancelled his participation. The organization called for an immediate ceasefire and for Congo to negotiate with the M23.

On January 26, the Rwandan representative to the UN said that the Congolese military violated the previous ceasefire agreement and that the presence of foreign mercenaries poses a threat to Rwanda. On January 28 a Rwandan government spokesman also pointed out that the FARDC had also worked the FDLR militia in the past. Kagame agreed to Kenya's offer to host a summit between him and Tshisekedi. Also on that day, Rwandan Foreign Minister Olivier Nduhungirehe said that Tshisekedi "will have to accept talks with M23 to end the situation once and for all." The Rwandan ambassador-at-large for the Great Lakes region, Vincent Karega, said that the M23 offensive "will continue" into the DRC's South Kivu province, on January 29, and added it is "possible" that M23 will continue all the way to the capital Kinshasa, though it was unlikely.

Uganda announced on January 31 that it was going to deploy troops to its border with eastern Congo due to the worsening security situation, and where the Ugandan People's Defence Force had also in recent months carried out joint operations with the FARDC against the Allied Democratic Forces insurgency.

The African Christian Democratic Party in South Africa released a statement that they were "deeply concerned" about the dire situation for South African troops stationed in the city after 13 of their peacekeepers were already killed, with the remaining likely not having access to proper equipment or support to continue fighting. They further called for a ceasefire and diplomatic negotiations to begin for the parties involved, for all South African peacekeepers stationed abroad to return home until they are assured to have the necessary resources to fulfil their duties, and for the President and other members of the government to better address the situation, who until this point only released a statement that they were saddened by the loss of some of their peacekeepers.

South African president Cyril Ramaphosa had a phone conversation with Kagame regarding a ceasefire and later said that his country's presence in eastern Congo is not meant to be seen as a "declaration of war against any country or state." But the South African minister of defense, Angie Motshekga, stated that the M23 offensive against South African positions, resulting in the death of 13 South African peacekeepers, was only alleviated after President Ramaphosa told the Rwandan government that continued attacks would be interpreted by South Africa as a "declaration of war" by Rwanda.

President Ramphosa later also wrote on X that the South African peacekeepers had been killed by the "Rwanda Defence Force (RDF) militia." This led to a reaction from President Kagame, who replied to him and wrote that he and other officials had lied, that there had been no warning to Rwanda during their during their conversation, and that the RDF is not a militia. Kagame then claimed that South Africa is not in a position to mediate because the peacekeepers in the region were working with "genocidal armed groups" that threaten Rwanda.

Angolan ceasefire observers stationed in the city were evacuated on January 28 as the situation there deteriorated, prompting the deputy head of MONUSCO, Vivian van de Perre, to state the Angolan-mediated peace process needed to be restarted. The next day Angolan president João Lourenço called for the "immediate withdrawal" of Rwandan troops from the DRC and offered to host a summit in Angola between the leaders of the two countries. Kenya called for both the DRC and M23 to agree to a ceasefire.

The European Union released a statement on January 25 stating that "Rwanda must cease its support for the M23 and withdraw". Several European countries, including Germany, France, and the United Kingdom warned their citizens in Goma to leave the city. French foreign minister Jean-Noël Barrot stated that "France strongly condemns the offensive led by the M23, backed by the Rwandan armed forces" and called for diplomatic talks to resume and a ceasefire between those involved. A statement by British ambassador James Kariuki stated the United Kingdom was "deeply alarmed by the events in Goma", recognized Rwandan involvement in the offensive, and urged the DRC and Rwanda to return to diplomacy and form a ceasefire as soon as possible without preconditions. The German government suspended negotiations with Rwanda regarding foreign aid on January 28.

The United States warned its citizens to leave Goma because of the deteriorating situation and one day later, Secretary of State Marco Rubio condemned the M23 attack, affirming that the U.S. supports the Congolese sovereignty in a phone call with Tshisekedi. Rubio called for an immediate ceasefire on January 28, after a phone conversation with Kagame, and for all parties to respect sovereign territorial integrity.

In response to the killing of a Uruguayan peacekeeper, Uruguay condemned the "targeted attack" on UN soldiers, labeling them as war crimes.
