= April 2020 Virunga National Park massacre =

Terrorist incident in Democratic Republic of the Congo

- Part of Kivu conflict
- Location: Rumangabo, Virunga National Park, Democratic Republic of the Congo
- Date: April 24, 2020; 11am
- Deaths: 17: 13 park rangers; 4 civilians
- Injuries: 5: 3 park rangers; 2 civilians
- Perpetrator: FDLR-FOCA

On April 24, 2020, fighters from the Democratic Forces for the Liberation of Rwanda (FDLR) killed twelve park rangers and four tourists in Virunga National Park, Democratic Republic of the Congo.

== Background ==
Hutu rebels and former Interahamwe members fleeing the Tutsi capture of Rwanda following the Rwandan genocide perpetrated by Hutus in 1994 fled to eastern Congo. These Hutu refugees formed several armed groups, the most prominent being the FDLR. Throughout the aftermath of the Second Congo War and Kivu conflict, the Virunga National Park has suffered attacks by rebel groups against the park rangers and tourists. At the time of the massacre, the park was closed to prevent gorillas from getting COVID-19.

== Massacre ==
A group of fifteen park rangers were on their way back to Virunga from the bush on April 24 when they saw a civilian vehicle that had been attacked near the village of Rumangabo. As they escorted the civilian vehicle back to Virunga, they were ambushed by sixty FDLR fighters. The ambush occurred near Bukima, and very close to a National Park headquarters. Twelve park rangers and four civilians were immediately killed in the ambush, and one ranger died of his injuries later on. Three park rangers were injured in the massacre, and two civilians were injured as well.

== Aftermath ==
The Congolese Institute for the Conservation of Nature (ICCN) stated that the FDLR and its armed wing Forces Combattantes Abacunguzi were responsible for the massacre. The ICCN stated that the FDLR knows "every inch of the park", and controls its southeastern portion. UNESCO condemned the massacre.
