= Ndjala massacre =

2020 attack in the Democratic Republic of the Congo

- Part of Ituri conflict and Lendu-Hema conflict
- Location: Ndjala, Djugu territory, Ituri Province, Democratic Republic of the Congo
- Date: May 17, 2020; 1 am (UTC+02:00)
- Deaths: 22+
- Injuries: 17+
- Perpetrator: CODECO

On the night between May 16 and 17, 2020, militants from the Lendu CODECO killed twenty-two civilians in the Hema village of Ndjala, in Ituri Province, Democratic Republic of the Congo.

== Background ==
Lendu farmers and Hema herders have been in conflict for centuries in Ituri, with both groups forming militias during the Second Congo War between 1999 and 2003. Conflict renewed between the two groups in December 2017 in Djugu territory, with Lendu militias growing exponentially. The main Lendu militia, CODECO, began attacks against Congolese forces and other militias, and killing civilians across Ituri province.

== Massacre ==
The attack began around 1 am at the Hema village of Ndjala. The attack targeted all Hema in the village, with many people being slashed by machetes. A local administrator in Djugu territory, where Ndjala is located, stated at least twenty people were killed in the initial aftermath and over fourteen were injured. This rose to seventeen wounded, and twenty-two people killed by the next day.

While no group initially claimed responsibility for the attack, CODECO was suspected due to the Lendu-Hema conflict.
