= Kisangani massacre =

Incident in the Second Congo War in 2002

- Part of the Second Congo War
- Kisangani massacre (Democratic Republic of the Congo)
- Location: 0°31′0″N 25°12′0″E; Kisangani, Tshopo, DR Congo
- Date: May 13–15, 2002
- Attack type: Massacre, Looting, arson, war rape
- Deaths: 183+
- Victims: Civilians and mutinying soldiers
- Perpetrator: Rally for Congolese Democracy
- Motive: Repression of a mutiny

The Kisangani massacre occurred from May 13–15, 2002 in the city of Kisangani, Tshopo. After suppressing a mutiny, the Rally for Congolese Democracy started extrajudicial killings, lootings, and rape in the city, killing as many as 183 people.

== Background ==
Kisangani, strategically located on the Tshopo and Lindi rivers, is the crossroads between eastern and western Congo. It is home to two airports, the Simisini and the Bangoka, which allows for easy resupply and force projection and to a large diamond market. It was because of these reasons that Kisangani was often disputed and fought over by the Congolese military and different rebel groups, who were supported by Rwanda, Uganda, and Burundi.

The Second Congo War had been ongoing for three years, the first battles over the city occurred in August 1999 between Uganda and Rwanda leaving 200 people dead. This battle also resulted in the end of the Ugandan-Rwandan alliance. Clashes in the city would begin again in June 2000 between the Rwandan Patriotic Front and the Uganda People's Defence Force, called the Six-Day War. During the war the Rwandan Patriotic Front successfully pushed the Uganda People's Defense Force out of the city, the conflict killed 1,576 people and destroyed 4,000 of the city's buildings. After the Six-Day War RPF forces withdrew from the city leaving it in the hands of their proxy group, the Rally for Congolese Democracy (RCD).

== The mutiny ==
Around midnight of May 13 and 14, several mid-ranking military commanders launched a mutiny, the mutineers spread out around the city going from military post to military post recruiting people. At 5 A.M local time gunfire was first heard in the city. Mutineers belonging to the seventh brigade numbering around 60-70 attack a police station and disarmed the forces there, then they made their way to the next police station. Mutineers then went to the military prison and after overpowering the guards freed the prisoners in the prison. Mutineers then made their way to the RTNC radio station and captured it at 6 A.M. At the radio station they began to broadcast messages to the whole city calling them rise in rebellion against the "Rwandan invaders" and to kill them and chase them out of the city. They also called on MONUSCO and the FARDC forces to send reinforcements to them. Hearing these broadcasts loyal RCD soldiers began to storm the city, recapturing the radio station at 7:50 A.M. By noon RCD forces had brought 120 reinforcements on two planes from Goma and using them had managed to recapture the entire city from the mutineers. Also at noon, high-ranking military commanders of the RCD had also arrived from Goma, included the Seventh Brigade commander Laurent Kunda. The RCD says 41 people were killed during the mutiny and immediately after it including 21 civilians.

== Looting and killings ==
Just after the Mutiny ended, the RCD began a harsh crackdown on the city. By noon of May 14 the mutiny had ended, mass looting, rapes, and killings were common. Civilians were oftentimes robbed in the street, told to hand over their valuables and money or be killed. RDC and Rwandan soldiers went from house to house looting radios, vehicles, TV, animals, and anything else that had value. Civilians were forced at gunpoint to carry stolen items.

On Tshopo bridge an unknown number of people were summarily executed, Commanders and other leaders of the mutiny were forced to be killed by their own men and were thrown over thee bridge into the Tshopo river below. Bodies were cut open and filled with stones so they would sink to the bottom. According to one report more the 100 people were killed at the bridge, another witness claimed that 63 RCD soldiers that had participated in the Mutiny and an unknown number of police had been executed.

Near the end of the mutiny, Commander Ibuka ordered all police to return to their positions. He was later executed, RCD forces took it upon themselves to try and discover who deserted their post or were part of the mutiny. At Camp Ketele an unknown number of police were taken to an uninhabited area and executed. On May 14, about a dozen police were executed at Bangboka Airport and again on May 15, 13 captured policemen that had supposedly deserted their post were taken to a mass grave and executed. At a Unibra brewery two soldiers were executed.

According to a UN investigation, 183 people were killed by RCD forces, 103 civilians, 60 police and military person executed, and 20 found dead in the Tshopo River, though the number executed at Tshopo Bridge may have been much higher than reported and many bodies may have just sunk down to the river bed or have been washed downstream.

== See also ==
- List of massacres in the Democratic Republic of the Congo
