= Makutano massacre =

Terrorist incident in Democratic Republic of the Congo on 3 September 2021

- Part of Allied Democratic Forces insurgency of the Kivu conflict
- Location: Makutano, Beni Territory, North Kivu, Democratic Republic of the Congo
- Date: 3 September 2021
- Deaths: 30+
- Injuries: Unknown
- Perpetrator: ISCAP

The Makutano masssacre occurred on 3 September 2021 as perpetrated by Allied Democratic Forces (ADF) militants, who attacked the village of Makutano, Beni Territory, North Kivu, Democratic Republic of the Congo, killing at least thirty people.

== Background ==
Following the radicalization of its founding leader, Jamil Mukulu, the ADF was formed as a merger of several rebel groups (initially called ADF/NALU) in 1995. The ADF initially operated in western Uganda but has since, and currently continues to operate solely in the eastern DRC; this includes the North Kivu and Ituri Provinces.

The ADF's leadership shifted after the imprisonment of Mukulu on 30 April 2015. Musa Seka Baluku, Mukulu's second-in-command since the group's formation, stepped forward in his place shortly after. Under Baluku's leadership, the group made contact with the Islamic State (IS) as early as 2017, were formally recognized as a chapter of IS–Central Africa Province (IS-CAP) in 2018, and formally pledged their allegiance to the IS in 2019. By that year, the ADF had split, with one part remaining loyal to Mukulu and the other to Baluku. Since joining IS-CAP, the ADF increasingly targeted civilians into their attacks.

On 28 August 2021, weeks prior to the attack in Makutano, ADF militants killed 19 people in Kasanzi, also in Beni Territory.

== Massacre ==
A survivor of the massacre told Reuters that the militants attacked late at night, and his son tripped and fell and was killed by ISCAP. The jihadists killed the residents with machetes, their modus operandi in village attacks. At least 30 people were killed in the attacks. No group claimed responsibility for the massacre, although ISCAP is suspected due to the recent spree of massacres.
