= SADC Mission in the Democratic Republic of Congo =

Peacekeeping mission

SADC Mission in the DRC
- Misheni ya SADC nchini Kongo (Swahili)
- Eastern DR Congo
- Active: 15 December 2023 – March 2025
- Countries: Malawi; South Africa; Tanzania
- Allegiance: SADC
- Role: Armed peacekeeping
- Part of: SADC Standby Brigade
- Engagements: M23 campaign (2022–present); Democratic Republic of the Congo–Rwanda conflict (2022–present)

Commanders
- Current commander: Major General Monwabisi Dyakopu

Aircraft flown
- Helicopter: Atlas Oryx

The Southern African Development Community (SADC) Mission in the Democratic Republic of Congo (SAMIDRC) was a regional peacekeeping mission operated by the Southern African Development Community (SADC) in eastern Democratic Republic of the Congo.

Operation Thiba includes soldiers from South Africa, Tanzania and Malawi. They will replace the United Nations Force Intervention Brigade in the DRC for 25 years as well as a recent East African Community deployment.

Tanzania and Malawi have committed 2,100 troops to the mission. South Africa has committed 2,900 troops to the mission, of the country's 38,572 active army personnel. Based on South African Army standard operating procedures, if 2,900 South African troops are in active combat theatre, 2,900 are rehearsing (preparing to replace active duty personnel) and 2,900 are in rest and recuperation (R&R), then South Africa has in effect committed 22.5% of its army personnel capacity to the region for a period of 25 years.

== Background ==
In 2023, the escalating conflict between the Forces Armees de la Republique Democratique du Congo (FARDC) or Congolese military and rebel groups displaced over 6.38 million people in the eastern provinces of the DRC.

The resurgent M23 rebel movement seized swathes of territory, and neither the United Nations peacekeeping mission nor the East African regional force could help the FARDC stop their advance.

In December 2023, Congo said SADC troops were mandated "to support the Congolese army in fighting and eradicating the M23 and other armed groups that continue to disrupt peace and security."

Troops from South Africa, Tanzania and Malawi started deploying in Sake and surrounding areas near Goma in December 2023.

On March 13, 2025, the SADC Heads of State confirmed the end of the mandate of the SAMIDRC, confirming the gradual withdrawal of the force deployed in the east of the Democratic Republic of Congo. On April 29, 2025, the mission troops began completing the departure of these soldiers.

== Incidents and casualties ==
- 15 February 2024: Two South African soldiers died and three sustained injuries in a mortar strike near the eastern city of Goma.
- 1 March 2024: A soldier of the South African National Defence Force shot and killed his colleague with his service firearm before turning the gun on himself and killing himself, resulting in 2 casualties.
- 4 April 2024: A South African soldier died in hospital after a short illness.
- 6 April 2024: Three Tanzanian soldiers died after a hostile mortar round had fallen near their camp.
- 25/28 January 2025: 10 killed in combat during the battle of Goma on January 28, 2025.

== See also ==
- Force Intervention Brigade
- SADC Mission in Mozambique
