= Kamuronza =

- Grouping
- Groupement de Kamuronza
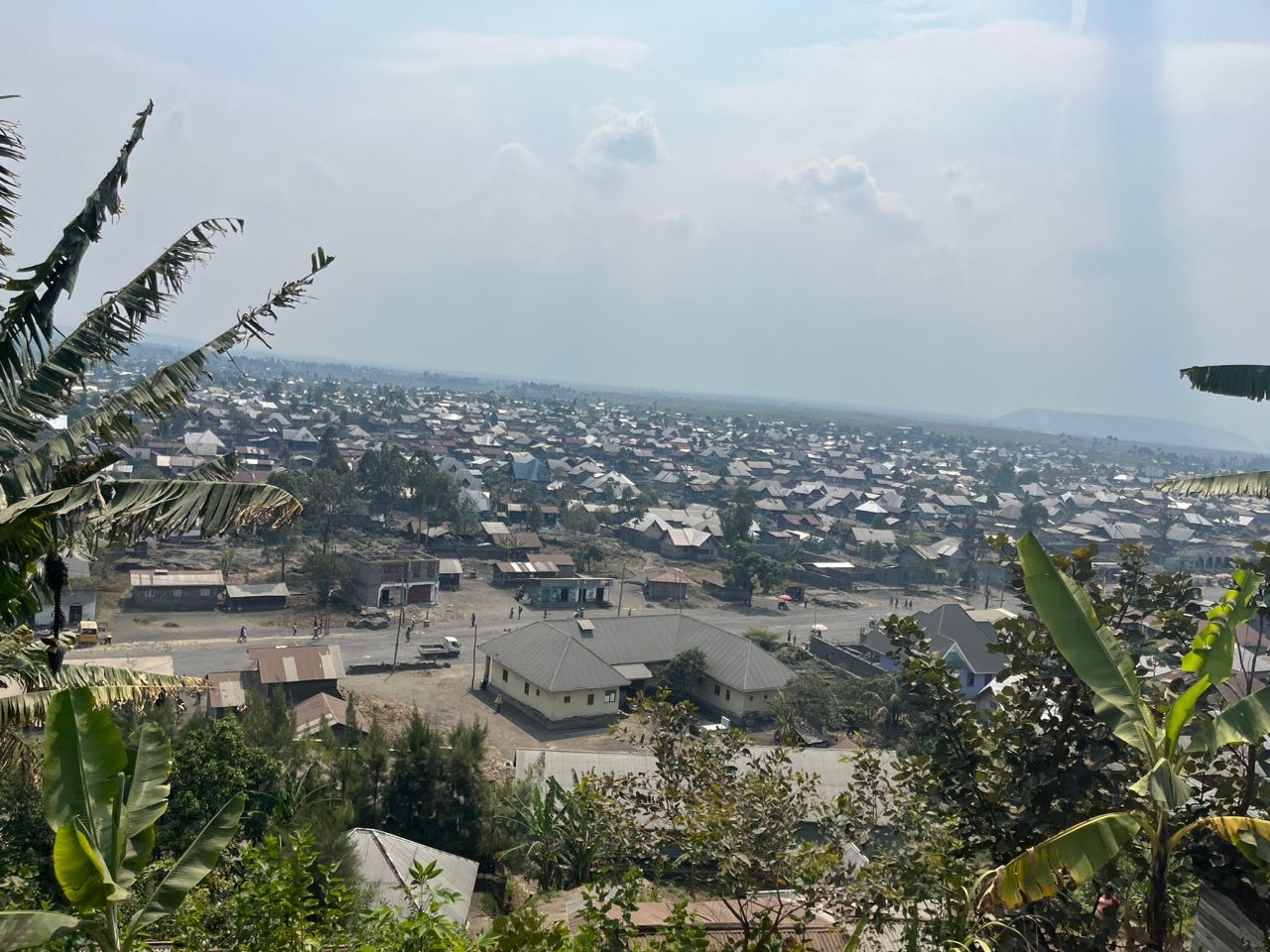
- Sake, Kamuronza
- Country: Democratic Republic of the Congo
- Province: North Kivu
- Territory: Masisi
- Chiefdom: Bahunde
- Administrative seat: Sake

Area
  - Total: 162 km^{2} (63 sq mi)

Population (2010 est.)
  - Total: 43,616
- Official language: French
- National language: Kiswahili

Kamuronza is one of the six groupements of the Bahunde Chiefdom, located in Masisi Territory, North Kivu, in the eastern Democratic Republic of the Congo. Its administrative center is the town of Sake. As of 2010, the groupement had an estimated population of 43,616 people and covers an area of approximately 162 square kilometers. Situated in the eastern part of Masisi Territory, Kamuronza is bordered to the north by the Bashali Chiefdom, to the south by Lake Kivu, which separates it from Kalehe Territory in neighboring South Kivu province, to the east by the city of Goma, to the west by the Mupfuni-Karuba groupement, and to the southwest by the Mupfuni-Shanga groupement.

Kamuronza is administratively divided into seven villages: Matcha, Malehe, Kimoka, Kingi, Katembe, Murambi, and Nzulo, with a population ethnically dominated by the Hunde, Hutu, and the Tutsi, along with smaller groups like the Batwa, Bashi, Nande, Havu, Tembo, Nyanga, and others.

== Geography ==
=== Terrain and climate ===
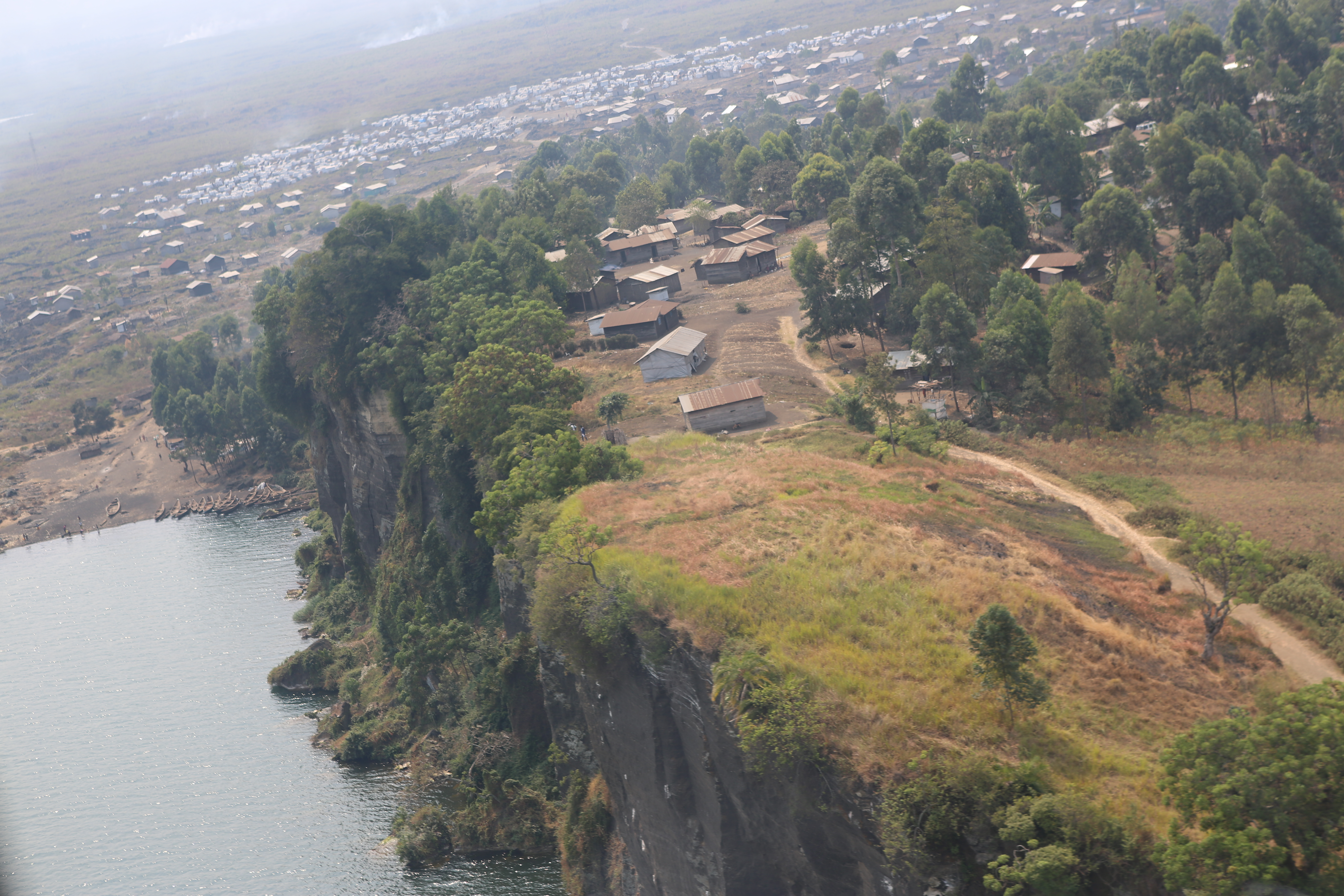
View of Sake and its surrounding landscape

Kamuronza lies within the Mitumba mountain range and is characterized by predominantly mountainous terrain. Elevations range from approximately 1,460 meters along the shores of Lake Kivu to about 2,750 meters in the northwestern highlands. The groupement experiences a temperate and humid climate, with average temperatures generally ranging between 15 °C and 25 °C. Rainfall is distributed across two main rainy seasons lasting a combined 7 to 8 months annually, with a long rainy season from September to December and a shorter one from February to April. These are separated by two dry periods, including a longer dry season from June to late August and a shorter dry spell around late December to January.

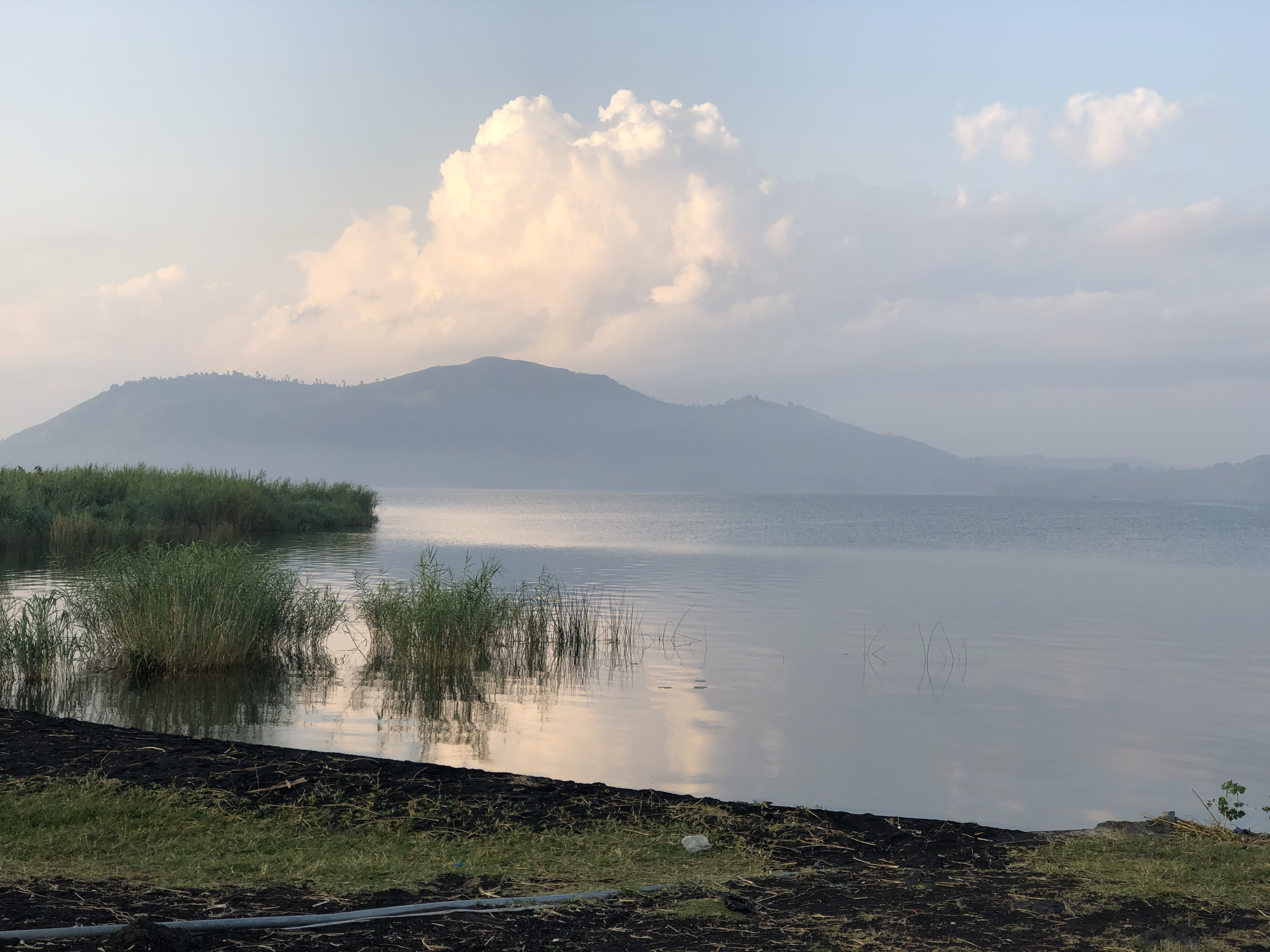
View of Lake Kivu shoreline as seen from Sake

The soils are largely sandy-clay in composition and of volcanic and mountainous origin. A second major soil type consists of wind-deposited volcanic ash that extends from the lowlands near Lake Kivu (1,460 meters) to elevations of about 2,600 meters. These aeolian deposits cover a broad area, including parts of the Buzi Peninsula and the regions around Sake and Kirotshe. Vegetation is dominated by savanna landscapes, which consist of grasses interspersed with scattered trees. Portions of eastern Kamuronza fall within the boundaries of Virunga National Park.

Hydrographically, and in addition to its southern boundary along Lake Kivu, the groupement is crossed by numerous rivers and streams, including the Kyabiringa and Kyamuhuwe rivers in Matcha, the Katahanwa River in Malehe, and the Buroha, Kahow, and Kinyabatsi rivers in Katembe. Other waterways include the Mwambi, Butengetenge, Kalonge, and Kibati rivers, while the Mutahyo River forms part of the western boundary. Kamuronza also has many natural springs, although many remain undeveloped and are often associated with waterborne pathogens due to limited infrastructure.

=== Governance and administration ===
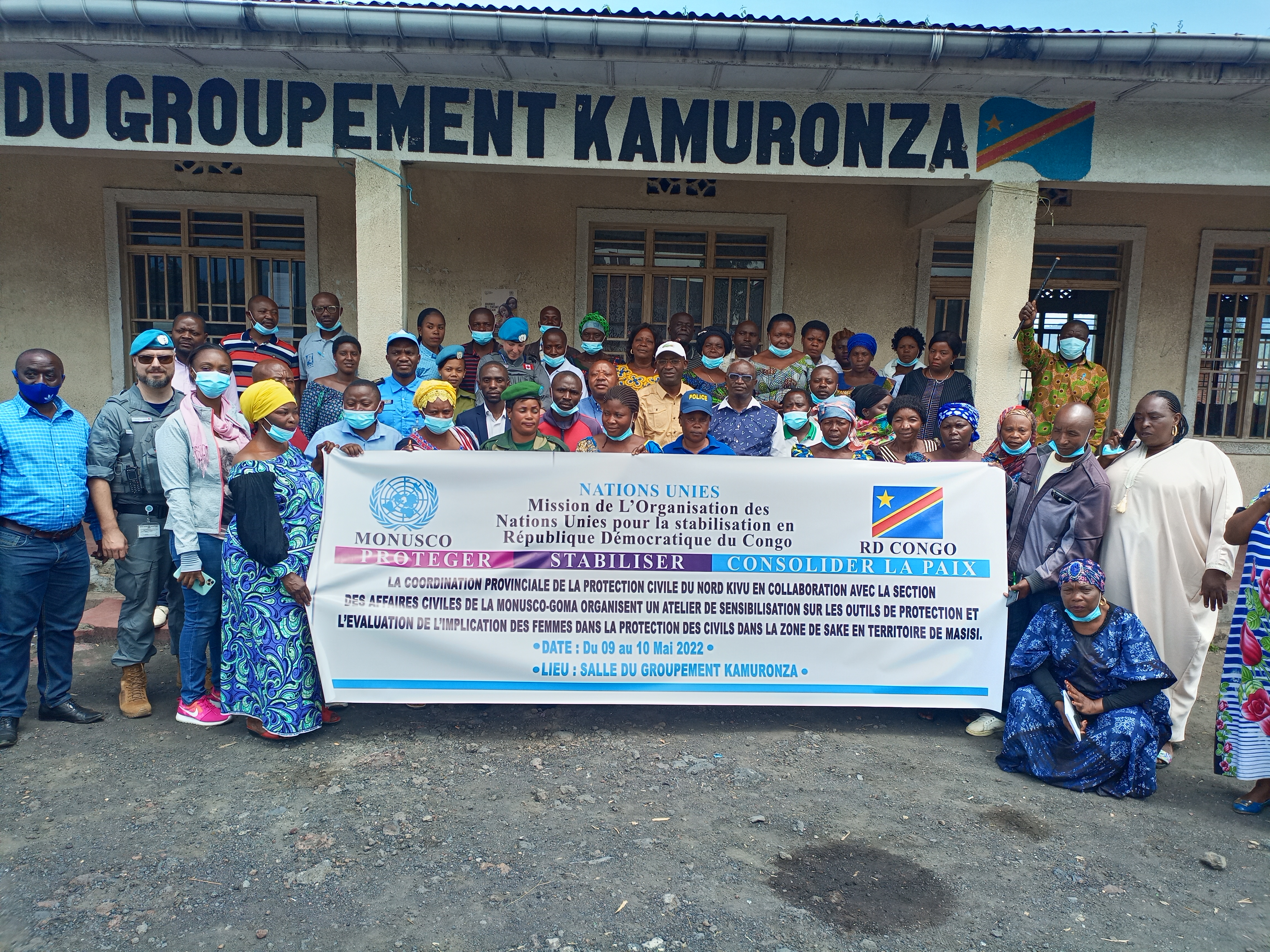
Officials and residents gathered at the Kamuronza office during a civil protection awareness workshop organized in collaboration with MONUSCO.

Governance is based on the customary structure of the Bahunde Chiefdom, with authority vested in the chef de groupement (grouping chief), who acts as the chief local leader and representative of the Mwami (paramount chief). This role is hereditary within the ruling lineage of the Mwami and involves administrative duties and the enforcement of customary law. The chef de groupement is assisted by a council of elders, whose advisory role focuses on maintaining and interpreting traditional norms. At the groupement level, justice is administered through a mix of customary and delegated systems, with minor disputes handled by local adjudicators, while more serious matters are referred to higher customary authorities under the Mwami.

Kamuronza is administratively subdivided into several localités (villages), each of which is led by a chef de localité (village chief) who acts as an intermediary between the population and the chef de groupement.

Localités (villages)
Matcha
Kimoka
Kingi
Malehe
Katembe
Murambi
Nzulo

== Demographics ==
=== Population ===
According to data from the Kamuronza civil registry office, the groupement had an estimated population of 43,616 people in 2010. The population is unevenly distributed among its villages, with Matcha being the most populous, accounting for 35.4% of the total population. It is followed by Kimoka (19.7%), Kingi (11.6%), Malehe (10.4%), Katembe (10.3%), Murambi (9.6%), and Nzulo (3%). Girls constitute 33.6% of the total population, boys 31.8%, and adult men 16.1%, with adult women making up the remaining share. Females represent approximately 52.1% of the population, compared to 47.9% for males.

Villages	Men	Women	Boys	Girls	Total	%
Matcha	2,690	3,165	4,535	5,065	15,455	35.4
Kimoka	1,287	1,515	2,898	2,880	8,580	12.7
Kingi	749	809	1,750	1,734	5,042	11.6
Malehe	769	804	1,428	1,540	4,541	10.4
Katembe	693	738	1,365	1,603	4,499	10.3
Murambi	656	723	1,439	1,360	4,178	9.6
Nzulo	184	244	437	456	1,321	3.0
Total	7,028	8,098	13,852	14,638	43,616	100

=== Ethnic composition ===
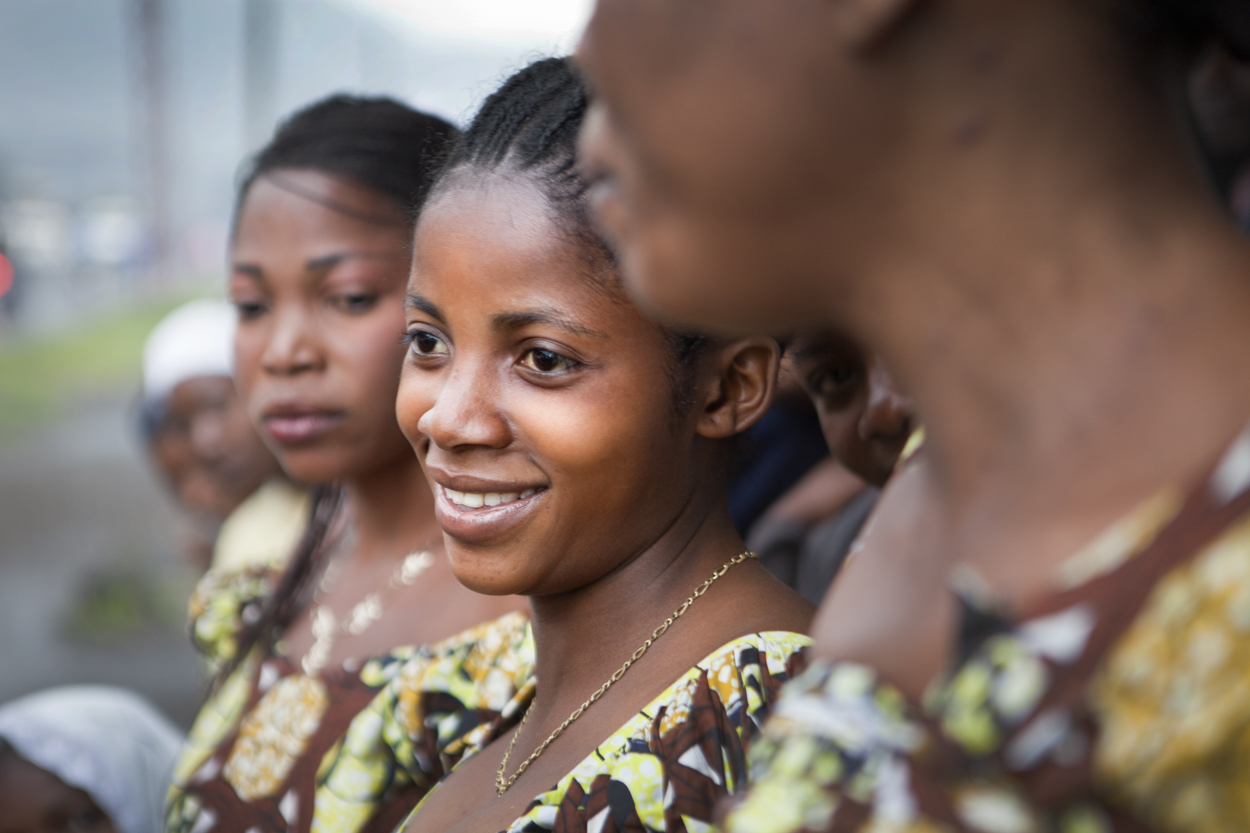
Women in Sake

Kamuronza is ethnically diverse, with the Batwa, regarded as some of the earliest inhabitants of Central Africa, found in Nyabirehe (Matcha), Luhonga (Kimoka), and Malehe. Traditionally reliant on hunting, gathering, and pottery, many Batwa have increasingly shifted toward agriculture due to population pressures and the gradual decline of forested areas. The Hunde, who have customary authority within the Bahunde Chiefdom, form the majority of the population and are present across all seven villages. Their main activities include farming, fishing, and trade, with a strong presence along the shores of Lake Kivu. The Hutu are similarly dispersed throughout the groupement and are largely involved in agriculture, supplemented by small-scale commercial activities. The Tutsi, who form a smaller proportion of the population, are traditionally cattle herders and are mainly concentrated in Malehe, Katembe, and Kingi.

Besides these principal groups, several other groups, including the Bashi, Nande, Tembo, Nyanga, and others, are also present.

=== Healthcare and education ===
Healthcare services are provided primarily through three health centers (centres de santé, CS), all of which operate under the supervision of the Kirotshe Rural Health Zone (Zone de Santé Rurale de Kirotche), including Neenero Health Center (CS Neenero), established in 1999 in Murambi; Kingi Health Center (CS Kingi), founded in 1958 in Kingi; and Sake Afia Health Center (CS Sake Afia), located in Matcha and established in 1984.

Historically, Kamuronza did not have secondary and higher education institutions. Over time, however, the education sector has significantly expanded, with the groupement currently composing a network of primary, secondary, and higher education institutions distributed across its villages.

Primary schools (école primaire; EP):

Villages	Schools	Network	Type of building
Kingi	EP Gasura	Catholic	Semi-permanent
	EP Mupfunanwa	Protestant (CEPAC)	Semi-permanent
	EP Kalonge	Protestant (CEBCA)	Semi-permanent
	EP Kisingati	Catholic	Semi-permanent
	EP Hanika	Adventist	Semi-permanent
	EP Kakomero	Public	Semi-permanent
Katembe	EP Kalambairo	Adventist	Semi-permanent
	EP Buroha	Protestant (CEPAC)	Semi-permanent
Kimoka	EP Kadogo	Islamic	Permanent
	EP Pili Pili	Islamic	Permanent
	EP Kimoka	Protestant (CEPAC)	Permanent
Matcha	EP Kamuronza	Kamuronza	Permanent
	EP Kibyancha	Public	Permanent
	EP Kasinga	Protestant (EDAC)	Permanent
	EP Fazili	Protestant (CEPAC)	Semi-permanent
	EP Matcha	Islamic	Semi-permanent
	EP Mubambiro	Protestant (CEBCA)	Permanent
Malehe	EP Malehe	Catholic	Semi-permanent
Murambi	EP Lueyo	Catholic	Semi-permanent
	EP Neenero	Adventist	Semi-permanent
Nzulo	EP Maindule	Catholic	Semi-permanent

Secondary schools (écoles secondaires):

Villages	Schools	Network	Type of building
Kingi	Institut Mupfumu	Catholic	Semi-permanent
	Institut Mataba	Adventist	Semi-permanent
Katembe	—	—	—
Kimoka	Institut Kamuronza	Protestant (CEPAC)	Semi-permanent
Matcha	Institut Mululu	Public	Permanent
	Institut Matcha	Islamic	Semi-permanent
	Institut Mubambiro	Protestant (CEBCA)	Semi-permanent
	Institut Kiluku	Protestant (EDAC)	Permanent
Malehe	Institut Malehe	Adventist	Semi-permanent
Murambi	—	—	—
Nzulo	Institut Maindule	Catholic	Semi-permanent

== Economy ==
=== Agriculture ===
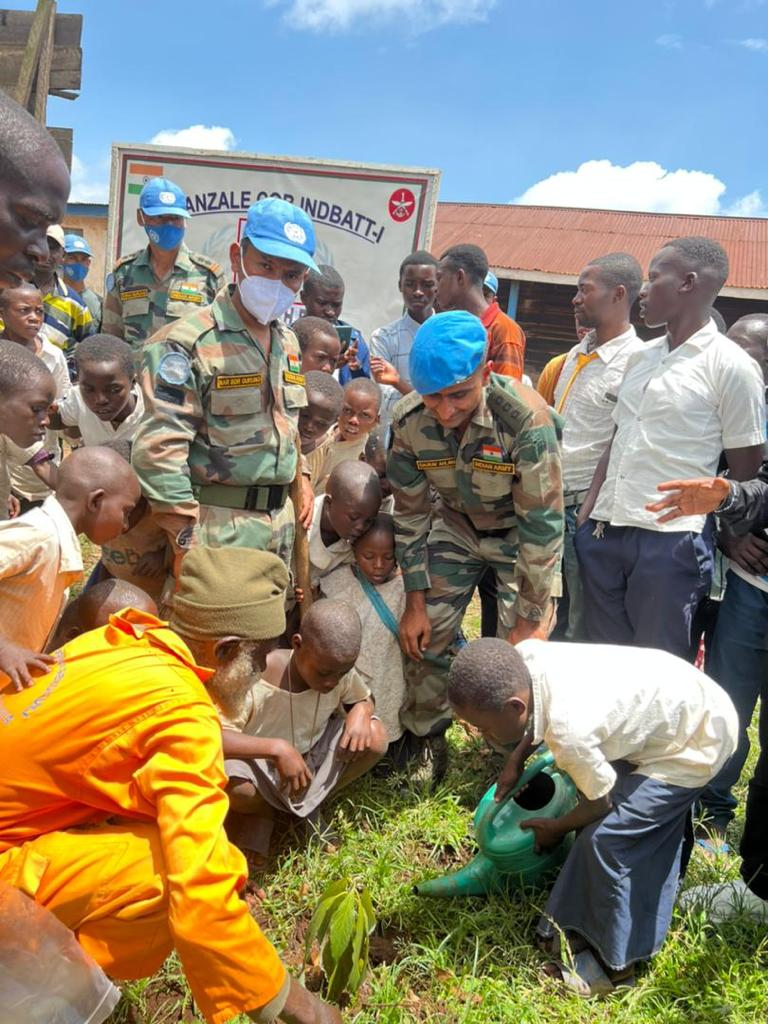
MONUSCO-led tree planting in Sake

Agriculture is subsistence-based and market-oriented, and it forms a major source of income for the population. The division of labor is traditionally organized along gender lines, with men typically undertaking physically demanding tasks such as tree felling and land clearing, while plowing is carried out jointly by men and women. Activities considered less physically intensive, including weeding and harvesting, are generally performed by women. The principal crops cultivated include sweet potatoes, beans, cassava, bananas, and various vegetables.

Agricultural production is often irregular, largely due to climatic variability and prolonged insecurity in the region since 1994. Cultivation is less developed in the villages of Matcha and Nzulo, partly because of volcanic lava flows from Mount Nyiragongo and the inclusion of portions of these areas within the boundaries of Virunga National Park, and, as a result, the population of Matcha is more engaged in trade, while that of Nzulo relies more heavily on fishing.

=== Livestock farming ===
Livestock farming also forms the backbone of the local economy. However, it experienced a decline during the interethnic conflicts of 1994 and the subsequent First and Second Congo Wars, when large numbers of animals were looted. With the gradual improvement of security conditions, livestock production has been slowly recovering.

Cattle breeding is practiced in grazing areas, particularly in Katembe, Murambi, Kingi, and Malehe. Small livestock farming is also widespread and includes pig rearing, especially in areas such as Neenero in Murambi and in Malehe, as well as goat farming, which is practiced in nearly all villages. Sheep are rarely raised, except in isolated cases, and their slaughter is often conducted informally in the Bahunde Chiefdom. Poultry farming remains largely traditional, with minimal use of modern techniques, and includes chickens, ducks, turkeys, guinea fowl, and rabbits. Since 2009, the organization Veterinarians Without Borders (Vétérinaires Sans Frontières, VSF) has supported goat farming initiatives in the groupement. The program distributes goats to vulnerable households and provides veterinary support, with beneficiaries typically receiving seven goats and one male goat, particularly in Kingi.

=== Fishing and infrastructure ===
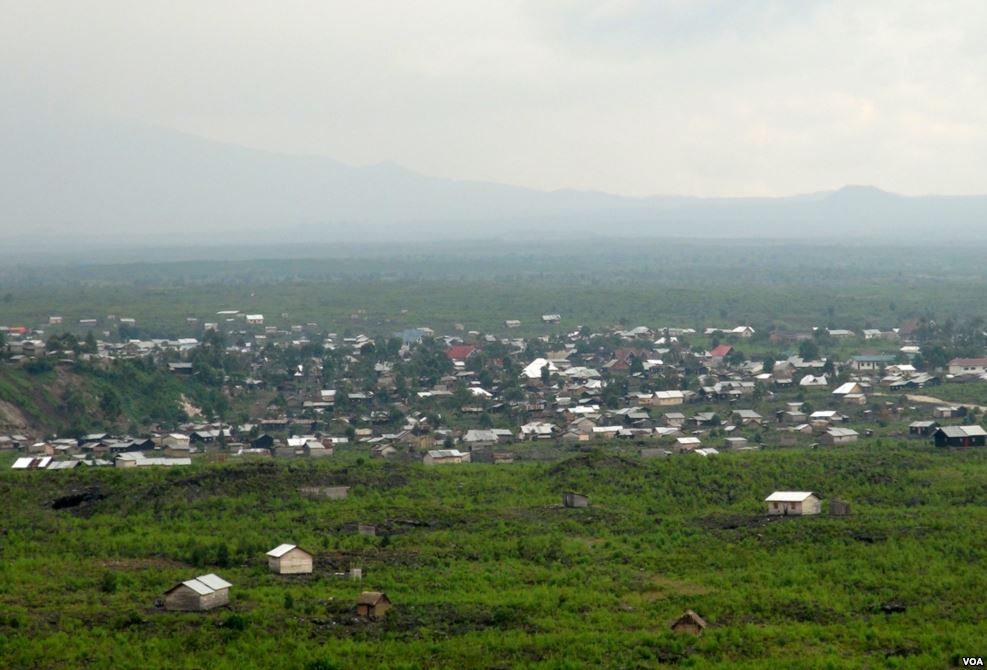
Clustered housing and rural infrastructure in Sake

Fishing is practiced along the shores of Lake Kivu, particularly by residents of Nzulo. The main species caught include haplochromis (locally known as "ndugu"), Oreochromis niloticus, and Limnothrissa miodon ("sambaza"). Part of the catch is consumed locally, while the remainder is sold in local markets.

Settlements in the groupement are generally concentrated, with houses constructed mainly from wood and thatched roofing materials. Some dwellings are built as durable or semi-durable structures. Sanitation facilities remain limited, as trash bins are not commonly used in some areas, and when present, they are often utilized to avoid penalties from hygiene authorities. The same issue applies to the use of pit latrines.

== Culture ==
The influence of Christianity and Islam has led to a decline in traditional beliefs in Kamuronza. Although the population now shares belief in one God, with many people belonging to different religious communities, including Catholic, Protestant, Muslim, and Adventist groups.

Recreational and cultural activities include games across the groupement and theatrical performances organized by schools and churches. Sports are also practiced through various clubs, including football teams like Radi, Isan, and Buuma, in addition to volleyball and karate.
