= Lists of Democratic Republic of the Congo attacks =

Lists of Democratic Republic of the Congo attacks contains links to articles on attacks per year or period.

Summary count of civilians killed in attacks:

2018. 1,339 deaths
2019. 1,702 deaths
2020. 2,507 deaths
2021. 3,076 deaths
2022. 2,252 deaths
2023. 2,502 deaths
2024. 2,241 deaths
2025. N/A

== Lists of attacks in chronological order ==
- 2020 Democratic Republic of the Congo attacks
- 2021–2024 Democratic Republic of the Congo attacks
- 2025 Democratic Republic of the Congo attacks

== See also ==
- List of massacres in the Democratic Republic of the Congo
- Attacks on humanitarian workers
