= Peter Cirimwami Nkuba =

Congolese military officer and governor

Military Governor of North Kivu
- In office 19 September 2023 – 24 January 2025
- President: Félix Tshisekedi
- Preceded by: Constant Ndima Kongba
- Succeeded by: Evariste Somo

Personal details
- Born: South Kivu
- Died: 24 January 2025 Kinshasa, Democratic Republic of the Congo
- Cause of death: Gunshot wounds

Military service
- Allegiance: DR Congo
- Branch/service: Land Forces of the Democratic Republic of the Congo
- Rank: Major general
- Battles/wars: Second Congo War; Kivu conflict; M23 offensive †

Peter Cirimwami Nkuba (died 24 January 2025) was a Congolese military officer and politician who served as the governor of North Kivu province from 2023 until he was killed in action in 2025 while fighting the M23 rebels during the latter's campaign.

== Biography ==
Peter Cirimwami Nkuba was born in South Kivu and belonged to the Abashi ethnic group. He had a long career in the Armed Forces of the Democratic Republic of the Congo (FARDC). Over the course of his service, he mostly oversaw operations in the eastern Congo.

On 24 July 2020, Major General Jacques Nduru Ytshaligonza transferred command of the Sokola I operational sector to Cirimwami Nkuba who had previously served as his subordinate. In 2022, he was made commander of the Sokola II operational sector, overseeing counterinsurgency operations in North and South Kivu. In this role, he headed the government forces during the operations against a renewed M23 rebellion. In April 2023, he was criticized for alleged retreat orders, though argued that two subordinate colonels had actually withdrawn without his input.

In September 2023, the Military Governor of North Kivu, Constant Ndima Kongba, was dismissed from his post due to the deadly suppression of a religious sect by his troops. Cirimwami Nkuba was appointed his successor. Over the next months, he rallied various militias -most notably FDLR and Wazalendo- to assist the FARDC against M23. He allegedly also closely cooperated with the Burundian military which had opted to assist the FARDC against M23.

On 23 January 2025, Cirimwami Nkuba visited the town of Mubambiro to calm the local public amid a major M23-led operation which targeted nearby Goma. At this point, the settlement of Sake was deemed the last line of defense before Goma. On the next day, Cirimwami Nkuba was shot at approximately 9:00 p.m. in Sake, overseeing the local frontline. Cirimwami was subsequently evacuated to Kinshasa, where his death was confirmed. The FARDC subsequently declared that a state funeral would be held for him, and that he would be posthumously promoted to lieutenant general. Somo Kakule Evariste was appointed new military governor of North Kivu on 28 January.

Military offices
Preceded by Constant Ndima Kongba	Military Governor of North Kivu; 2023–2025	Vacant Title next held by Evariste Somo
