= 2023 DRC anti-MONUSCO protests =

- 2023 Goma massacre Part of the Kivu conflict
- Date: August 27, 2023
- Location: Goma, Democratic Republic of the Congo
- Goals: Withdrawal of MONUSCO from the Democratic Republic of the Congo
- Methods: Protests

Parties
Anti-MONUSCO protestors	MONUSCO; Congolese Army; Congolese National Police

Lead figures
Uncentralized	António Guterres; Constant Ndima Kongba

Casualties and losses
56 protestors killed 67 injured 220+ arrested	1 policeman killed

The 2023 Goma massacre occurred on August 27, 2023, when a protest erupted in Goma, Democratic Republic of the Congo, against the presence of the United Nations Organization Stabilization Mission in the Democratic Republic of the Congo (MONUSCO) forces across the country. MONUSCO was accused of failing to prevent the violence by militant groups against civilians. Forty-eight protestors were shot dead by Congolese soldiers. The death toll increased to 56 on September 5, 2023, as eight critically injured people died of their wounds.

== See also ==
- List of massacres in the Democratic Republic of the Congo
- 2021–2024 Democratic Republic of the Congo attacks
