= Constant Ndima Kongba =

Congolese military officer

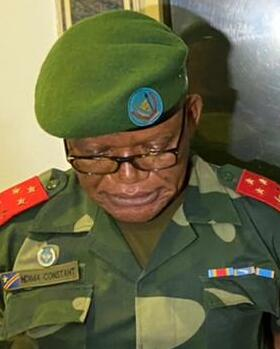
- Constant Ndima Kongba in 2021

Military governor of North Kivu
- In office May 2021 – 19 September 2023
- President: Félix Tshisekedi
- Preceded by: Carly Nzanzu Kasivita (as civil governor)
- Succeeded by: Peter Cirimwami (as military governor)
- Nickname: Effacer le tableau ("erase the board")

Military service
- Allegiance: Zaire (before 1997); Movement for the Liberation of the Congo (MLC) (?–2003); DR Congo (since 2003)
- Branch/service: Zairian Armed Forces (FAZ); Armed Forces of the Democratic Republic of the Congo (FARDC)
- Rank: Lieutenant general
- Battles/wars: Second Congo War; Operation Effacer le tableau; Kivu conflict; M23 offensive (2022)

Constant Ndima Kongba (Note: also known as "Ndima Kongba Constant" or "Ndima Constant") is a Congolese military officer who served as the military governor of North Kivu from May 2021 to September 2023. Before this appointment, he had served in high-ranking positions in the Armed Forces of the Democratic Republic of the Congo (FARDC). In the Second Congo War (1998–2003), Ndima was a commander in the Movement for the Liberation of the Congo; in this role, he was involved in Operation Effacer le tableau, a campaign that resulted in genocidal massacres.

== Biography ==
=== Early career in the FAZ and MLC ===
Constant Ndima Kongba joined the Zairian Armed Forces (FAZ) during the rule of Mobutu Sese Seko, becoming part of the elite Special Presidential Division. In the Second Congo War, Ndima joined the Movement for the Liberation of the Congo (MLC) rebel group. He served as general and led the MLC's "Effacer le tableau" battalion, infamous for the ferocity and brutality of its troops. By 2001/2002, he was placed directly under General Amuli Bahigua, MLC chief of staff.

From 2002 to 2003, the MLC and other insurgent factions conducted Operation Effacer le tableau against another rebel group, RCD-K-ML; Ndima was one of the main commanders of the MLC troops involved in this campaign. Operation Effacer le tableau resulted in numerous massacres of civilians, including the genocidal mass slaughter of the Bambuti pygmies. After the Second Congo War's conclusion, Ndima and many other MLC members were integrated into the Armed Forces of the Democratic Republic of the Congo (FARDC). Ndima's role in Operation Effacer le tableau was never addressed by the successive governments of the DR Congo. The MLC officially denied that Ndima had been present during the campaign.

=== Rise in the FARDC and governorship ===
In 2018, Ndima was appointed head of the FARDC's third military zone which covers the entire Kivu region, Maniema, and Tshopo. He was later promoted to FARDC Deputy Chief of General Staff in charge of administration and logistics.

In response to the continuing instability and violence in the northeastern parts of the country, President Félix Tshisekedi reorganized the government of several provinces in 2021. He moved members of the FARDC into leadership positions, with Ndima being appointed military governor of North Kivu, succeeding civil governor Carly Nzanzu Kasivita. (Note: It was initially reported that Ndima had been appointed military governor of Ituri Province.) In his first speech to the people of North Kivu, Ndima promised to act against corruption among the FARDC garrisons, to listen to local grievances, and improve the security situation. A few days after he had assumed office, the stratovolcano Mount Nyiragongo erupted. Ndima responded by ordering the evacuation of nearly a third of Goma's residents.

From March 2022, Ndima had to deal with a new offensive by the M23 rebel group. In course of this offensive, Ndima condemned calls for violence and the mobilization of the civilian population, stating that the FARDC was responsible for combating the rebels. After M23 insurgents captured the town of Bunagana and reopened its economically important border post under their own administration, North Kivu's government under Ndima forbid the import and export of goods through rebel-held territory. Ndima declared that any trader who cooperated with the insurgents would be treated as a "fraudster, collaborator with the enemy". On 12 July 2022, Ndima passed direct responsibility of commanding the local security forces to Lieutenant General Philémon Yav Irung. He was replaced on an interim basis by Major General Peter Cirimwami on 19 September 2023.
