= Flank eruption =

Type of volcanic eruption

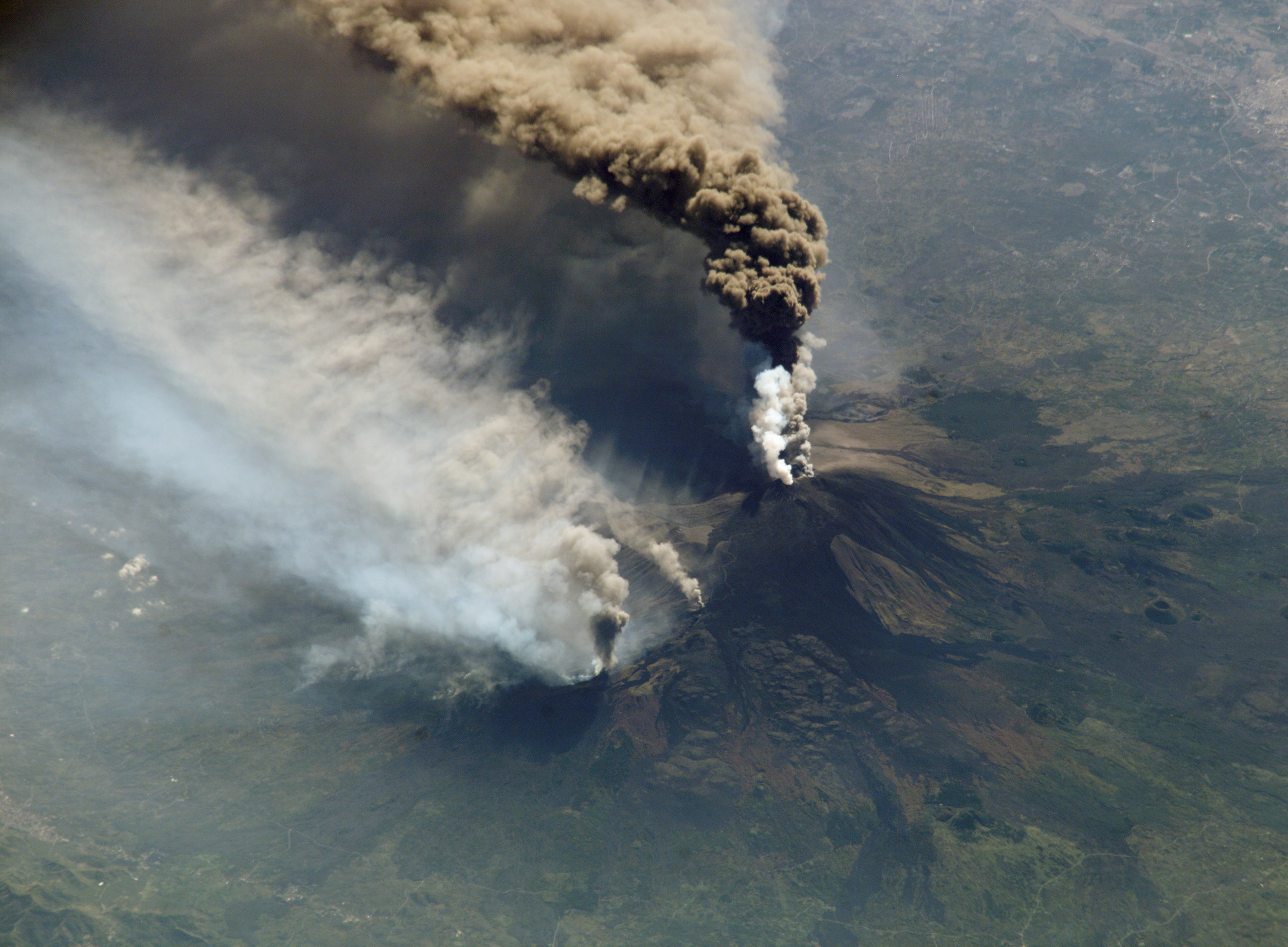
The 2002 eruption of Mount Etna was a flank eruption, occurring along two rift zones to the north-east and south of the summit craters. In this image taken from the International Space Station, the northeast flank is in the foreground. Steam rising from the summit craters obscures the lower part of the south flank eruption column.

A flank eruption is a volcanic eruption which occurs on the flanks of a volcano, instead of at its summit. Such eruptions occur when the conduit connecting the summit to the magma chamber below is blocked, forcing the magma to move laterally.

== Overview ==
At some volcanoes, flank eruptions are common, and occur along clearly defined rift zones. This is the case at Mauna Loa and Kilauea volcanoes in Hawaii, Piton de la Fournaise on Réunion Island, and Mount Etna in Italy. Flank and summit eruptions may occur at the same time.

Where there are inhabited areas on the flanks of a volcano, flank eruptions may be more destructive and dangerous than summit eruptions. Flank eruptions may also trigger the collapse of the volcanic edifice, causing lateral eruptions (such as the 1980 eruption of Mount St. Helens), landslides and tsunamis. Collapse-drive eruptions are among the largest and most destructive volcanic phenomena.
