= Yumbi =

- Territory
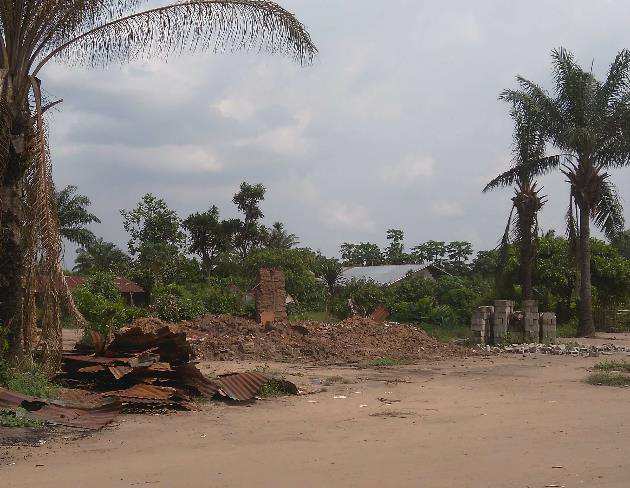
- Destroyed buildings in Yumbi

- Location within Democratic Republic of the Congo
- Coordinates: 1.900458°S 16.558628°E
- Country: DR Congo
- Province: Mai-Ndombe
- Seat: Yumbi
- Time zone: UTC+1 (WAT)
- National language: Lingala

Yumbi is a town and territory of Mai-Ndombe in the Democratic Republic of the Congo. It lies on the eastern bank of the Congo River between Bolobo and Lukolela. The town of Yumbi is the headquarters of Yumbi Territory and has a population of approximately 30,000.

On February 2, 2003 a tornado killed 17 people in and near the town. Over 4,000 people were injured, 217 seriously.

== 2018 massacre ==
Between December 16 and 18, 2018, at least 890 people were killed in four villages of the territory, as reported by the UNHCR. Around 465 houses and buildings were burned or looted, including two primary schools, two health centres, one market and the local Independent National Electoral Commission office. The motives of this massacre remain unclear but the UN hints to "clashes between Banunu and Batende communities". The real figure of people that were killed remains unknown because "there are most probably corpses that were thrown away in the river, and people that died in their burning homes."
