= Burundi–Democratic Republic of the Congo relations =

- Burundi: DR Congo

Burundi–Democratic Republic of the Congo relations refers to the current and historical relationship between Burundi and the Democratic Republic of the Congo.

== Political relations ==
=== 2023 ===
- Burundi cuts ties with Rwanda over rebel support allegations.

=== 2025 ===
- Uvira, near to the Burundi border, has a prison emptied that includes 228 deserters.
- Burundi, alongside the UNHCR, verifies and screens new arrivals from the DRC for protection.
- Congolese refugees are relocated to transit centers, where they receive food, water, and health services.
- Before M23 captured Uvira in South Kivu in December 2025, the FDNB had stationed at least 18,000 troops alongside Congolese government forces. Although the FNDB started withdrawing from eastern DRC after M23 left Uvira under US pressure in early 2026, it subsequently returned several thousand troops to South Kivu in support of Congolese military operations. Security sources interviewed by the French publication Jeune Afrique in mid-June 2026 estimated that more than 6,000 FDNB troops remain deployed in the DRC. The force also reinforced its presence by sending two additional battalions, totaling approximately 1,300 personnel, to South Kivu as part of a wider buildup of pro-government forces that began in mid-May 2026 after M23's withdrawal from the Ruzizi Plain under US pressure. There are also allegations that Wazalendo forces have supplied or shared drones with FDNB units conducting operations against Twirwaneho in the South Kivu highlands. The Burundian media outlet SOS Médias Burundi cited unverified claims from Congolese security sources on 12 and 21 June 2026 alleging that the Congolese government offered Burundi additional incentives linked to gold mining in Minembwe and other mining sites in Fizi Territory in return for increased military assistance to help restore government control over areas held by Twirwaneho.

== Military relations ==
=== 2021 ===
- M23 rebels begin to resurface, and the DRC seeks regional military support from Burundi.

=== 2022 ===
- Burundi, Tanzania, and Uganda all begin to deploy troops to eastern Congo.

=== 2025 ===
- UN Officials state that Burundi has maintained a military presence in eastern DRC for years, initially to combat Burundian rebels and more recently the M23 rebels.
- Burundian soldiers begin their withdrawal from the DRC after the fall of Bukavu.
- Over 10,000 people flee the DRC into Burundi, due to the escalating violence in Bukavu.
- Over 500 Congolese police flee to Burundi, but are disarmed at the border.
- Trucks carrying Burundian troops return home via border posts.
- Regional leaders hold a summit around the DRC-Rwanda conflict, but no concrete military action is proposed.

== Economic relations ==
=== 1983 ===
- SINELAC, an international electricity supplier, is founded by Burundi, the DRC, and Rwanda.

=== 1989 ===
- The Ruzizi II Hydroelectric Power Plant finishes construction.

=== 2025 ===
- Burundi and Uganda both seek economic influence in the region of the DRC.
