= Kasanzi massacre =

2021 massacre in Democratic Republic of the Congo

Kasanzi attack
- Part of Allied Democratic Forces insurgency of the Kivu conflict
- Location: Kasanzi, Beni Territory, North Kivu, Democratic Republic of Congo
- Date: August 28, 2021
- Deaths: 19
- Injuries: Unknown
- Perpetrator: ISCAP

On August 28, 2021, the Allied Democratic Forces (ADF) attacked the village of Kasanzi, Beni Territory, North Kivu, Democratic Republic of the Congo. Nineteen civilians were killed in the massacre, and the attack was part of a larger spree by ISCAP against villages in Beni Territory.

== Background ==
Following the radicalization of its founding leader, Jamil Mukulu, the ADF was formed as a merger of several rebel groups (initially called ADF/NALU) in 1995. The ADF initially operated in western Uganda but has since, and currently continues to operate solely in the eastern DRC; this includes the North Kivu and Ituri Provinces.

The ADF's leadership shifted after the imprisonment of Mukulu on 30 April 2015. Musa Seka Baluku, Mukulu's second-in-command since the group's formation, stepped forward in his place shortly after. Under Baluku's leadership, the group made contact with the Islamic State (IS) as early as 2017, were formally recognized as a chapter of IS–Central Africa Province (IS-CAP) in 2018, and formally pledged their allegiance to the IS in 2019. By that year, the ADF had split, with one part remaining loyal to Mukulu and the other to Baluku. Since joining IS-CAP, the ADF increasingly targeted civilians into their attacks.

== Attack ==
During the massacre, the ISCAP jihadists looted and burned homes in the village of Kasanzi near Virunga National Park. Congolese authorities stated that the attackers used machetes and guns to attack the populace. Civilian groups stated that there were no Congolese soldiers stationed nearby to prevent the attack. Initial reports stated that five bodies were found in the village and thirteen houses were torched and looted. The next day, searches by authorities and the Red Cross discovered fourteen more bodies in fields surrounding the village. Others had been killed returning or fleeing from the village.

Congolese authorities attributed the attack to ISCAP, although the group did not claim responsibility.
