= Sake, Democratic Republic of the Congo =

Sake
- Groupement capital and village
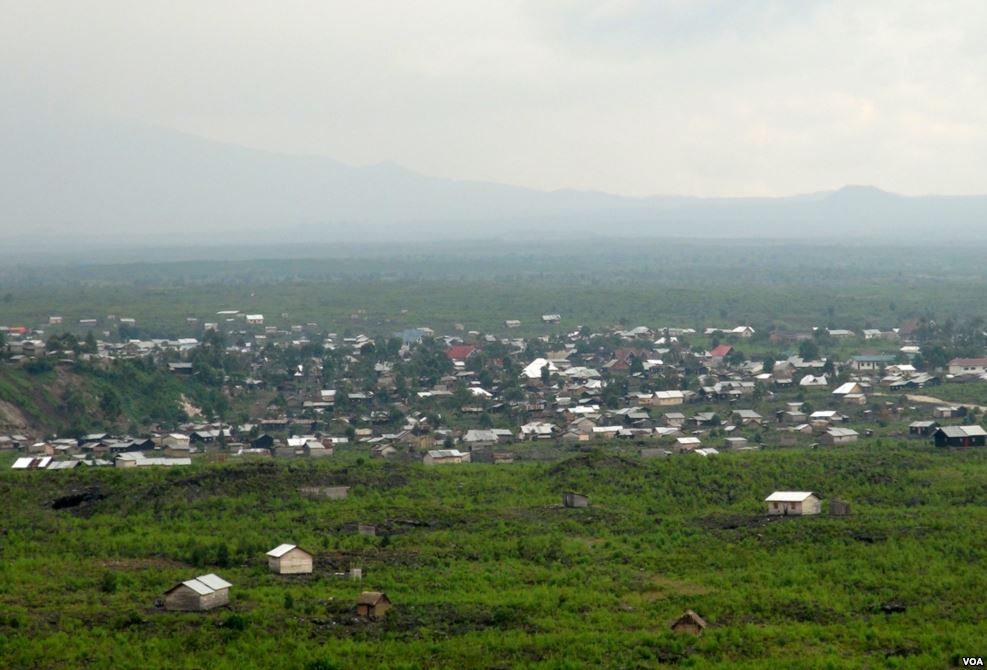

- Location within Democratic Republic of the Congo
- Coordinates: 1°34′26.79″S 29°2′28.78″E
- Country: Democratic Republic of the Congo
- Province: North Kivu
- Territory: Masisi Territory
- Chiefdom: Bahunde
- Groupement: Kamuronza

Population (2004)
  - Total: 17,151
- Time zone: UTC+2 (CAT)
- Climate: Aw
- National language: Swahili

Sake is a capital and village of the Kamuronza groupement, within the Bahunde Chiefdom, Masisi Territory, North Kivu, Democratic Republic of the Congo. It is located at the northwestern extremity of Lake Kivu, 25 km (15 mi) west-northwest of Goma on National Road No. 2, at the edge of the volcanic lava plains in the bottom of the Western Rift Valley, at an elevation of about 1500 m. The western escarpment of the rift valley rises to 800 m above Sake.

The lava comes from the volcanoes Nyamuragira and Nyiragongo, 25 km northwest, and numerous smaller volcanic cones which are fed by fissures from these volcanoes. A number of cones can be seen in satellite photographs 7–8 km east of Sake. They also show that lava flows in recent years have covered parts of the road to Goma (National Road No. 2) and have reached the lake, cutting off the bay in which Sake is located, to form a small lake of less than 1 square km. The adjacent bay, which is about 40 km^{2} in size, has almost been cut off by the lava and only a 160 m wide channel remains to connect it to the main body of Lake Kivu.

Sake has hosted Rwandans during the Great Lakes refugee crisis of the mid-1990s and Goma residents fleeing the 2002 eruption of Mount Nyiragongo. Deadly battles between the government military and forces led by Laurent Nkunda led thousands of residents of Sake to flee in August 2006. On 25 November 2006, fifteen to twenty thousands fled battles between Nkunda forces and the DRC army in an offensive waged by the former in the area of Sake. The fighting took place nearly a day before the Supreme Court was to rule on the outcome of the highly contested 2006 presidential run-off. The fighting appear to have dissipated the following morning.

Sake has also been home to the UN Force Intervention Brigade since July 2013.

== Geography ==
The climate of Sake is classified as Cfb under the Köppen climate classification system, which means it has a highland temperate climate with average temperatures of 19 °C and average rainfall of 1207 mm. The soil is of the andosol type, formed from the alteration of volcanic rocks, particularly ash, and is characterized by a high content of amorphous silica and alumina, very rich in organic matter (5–8%), with good water retention capacity (12–15%) and a pH of 7.
