= International Criminal Court investigation in the Democratic Republic of the Congo =

Situation in the Democratic Republic of the Congo
- The seal of the International Criminal Court
- File no.: 01/04
- Referred by: Democratic Republic of the Congo
- Date referred: 19 April 2004
- Date opened: 23 June 2004
- Incident(s): Second Congo War; Ituri conflict (Bogoro attack); Kivu conflict
- Crimes: Crimes against humanity: · Inhumane acts · Murder · Persecution · Rape · Sexual slavery · Torture; War crimes: · Attacks against civilians · Conscripting of children · Destruction of property · Enlisting of children · Inhuman treatment · Murder · Pillaging · Rape · Sexual slavery · Torture · Using children in conflict

Status of suspects
- Germain Katanga: Served a 12 year sentence
- Thomas Lubanga Dyilo: Served a 14 year sentence
- Callixte Mbarushimana: Charges not confirmed
- Sylvestre Mudacumura: Fugitive (Dead)
- Mathieu Ngudjolo Chui: Acquitted
- Bosco Ntaganda: Serving a 30 year sentence

The International Criminal Court investigation in the Democratic Republic of the Congo or the situation in the Democratic Republic of the Congo is an ongoing investigation by the International Criminal Court (ICC) into crimes committed in the Democratic Republic of the Congo (DRC) during the Second Congo War and its aftermath, including the Ituri and Kivu conflicts. The war started in 1998 and despite a peace agreement between combatants in 2003, conflict continued in the eastern parts of the country for several years. In April 2004 the government of the DRC formally referred the situation in the Congo to the International Criminal Court, and in June 2004, prosecutor Luis Moreno Ocampo, formally opened an investigation. To date, arrest warrants have been issued for:

- Thomas Lubanga Dyilo
- Germain Katanga
- Mathieu Ngudjolo Chui
- Bosco Ntaganda
- Callixte Mbarushimana
- Sylvestre Mudacumura.

Lubanga was imprisoned. Katanga was convicted, Chui was acquitted, and the pre-trial chamber declined to confirm the charges against Mbarushimana, currently a fugitive. Ntaganda turned himself in to the US Embassy in Kigali on 18 March 2013, requesting to be extradited to the ICC. Sylvestre Mudacumura was considered a suspect at large until his death in 2019.

== Historical background ==
The Democratic Republic of the Congo (DRC) was a colony of Belgium between 1885 and 1960. Initially, it was the personal property of King Leopold II, known as the Congo Free State, before becoming a Belgian colony in 1908. The country gained independence on June 30, 1960. Shortly after independence, political instability ensued, leading to a military coup d'état in 1965. Shortly after independence from Belgium, Mobutu Sese Seko seized power in a military coup d'état and installed himself as president. Under Mobutu's authoritarian rule, the country was known as Zaire. While the people of Zaire suffered from poverty and human rights abuses over the course of his 32-year regime, Mobutu embezzled an estimated $4–15 billion during his time in office. And by 1996, conflict from the Rwandan genocide spilled over into Zaire and Hutu militias, including the Interahamwe, were using refugee camps in the Kivu region to attack Rwanda. Rwandan and Ugandan armed forces invaded Zaire to fight Hutu militias, and ultimately overthrew Mobutu, in what was to become the First Congo War. Rwandan and Ugandan forces were joined by Congolese politicians and militia leaders opposed to Mobutu's rule and these groups joined forces to become the Alliance of Democratic Forces for the Liberation of Congo (AFDL), led by Laurent-Désiré Kabila. In 1997, Mobutu fled Zaire and Kabila named himself president and changed the name of the country back to the Democratic Republic of the Congo.

Following his victory, tensions soon rose between Kabila and the various factions of the AFDL who came to oppose his rule. Rwandan forces retreated to Goma on the Rwandan border and formed the Rally for Congolese Democracy (RDC) and in response Ugandan forces instigated the formation of Movement for the Liberation of the Congo (MLC) under the command of Jean-Pierre Bemba. These two groups started the Second Congo War by attacking the army of Kabila's government. Kabila was assassinated by his bodyguard in 2001 and succeeded as president by his son, Joseph, who eventually negotiated peace talks to end the war. Although one of the tenets of the peace accords was that rebel forces would join the Congolese army, violence has continued to the present day, especially in the Kivu and Ituri regions. Former rebels have continuously broken away, forming new rebel groups such as M23, who are fighting for control of Eastern Congo. The region is known for possessing mineral resources used for technology. Peace talks with M23 have been ruled out, as President Felix Tshisekedi claims that they are illegally exploiting the Democratic Republic of the Congo's natural resources.

== Referral ==
In July 2003, ICC Prosecutor Luis Moreno Ocampo announced that he had received communications from individuals and non-governmental organisations regarding the situation in the Congo and that his office would closely follow developments there. In September of that year, Moreno Ocampo informed the Assembly of States Parties (the governing body of the ICC) that he was prepared to apply for authorisation to begin a formal investigation but that he believed a referral from the Congolese government would expedite the investigation. In April 2004 Joseph Kabila formally referred the situation in the DRC to the ICC prosecutor and Moreno Ocampo formally opened the investigation that June. The DRC investigation was the first formal investigation conducted by the International Criminal Court.

== Charges ==
The Democratic Republic of the Congo

The ICC has jurisdiction to prosecute individuals who are accused of committing crimes defined under the Rome Statute (the treaty that established the Court) as either war crimes, crimes against humanity, or genocide. The prosecutor charged six people with crimes within the jurisdiction of the Court in the Democratic Republic of the Congo: Thomas Lubanga Dyilo, Germain Katanga and Mathieu Ngudjolo Chui, Bosco Ntaganda, Callixte Mbarushimana, and Sylvestre Mudacumura.

=== Thomas Lubanga Dyilo ===
Thomas Lubanga Dyilo was the alleged founder and leader of the Union of Congolese Patriots (UPC) and its military wing, the Patriotic Forces for the Liberation of the Congo (FPLC). He was charged on 10 February 2006 with three counts related to the military use of children from July 2002 to December 2003 in the Ituri region of the DRC. Counts one and two are alleged to have taken place at training camps in Bule, Centrale, Mandro, Rwampara, Bogoro, Sota, and Irumu. According to the arrest warrant for Lubanga Dyilo, count three took place during "hostilities in Libi and Mbau in October 2002, in Largu at the beginning of 2003, in Lipri and Bogoro in February and March 2003, in Bunia in May 2003 and in Djugu and Mongbwalu in June 2003." The counts are as follows:

1. Enlisting children, a war crime in violation of article 8(2)(b)(xxvi) of the Rome Statute;
2. Conscription of children, a war crime in violation of article 8(2)(b)(xxvi) of the Rome Statute;
3. Using children to participate in hostilities, a war crime in violation of article 8(2)(b)(xxvi) of the Rome Statute.

In 2012, he was convicted and sentenced to 14 years in prison and was released on 15 March 2020.

=== Germain Katanga and Mathieu Ngudjolo Chui ===
Germain Katanga, also known simply as "Simba" (the Swahili word for "lion"), was allegedly the commander of the Front for Patriotic Resistance in Ituri (FRPI). Mathieu Ngudjolo Chui was allegedly the leader of the Nationalist and Integrationist Front (FNI). Katanga and Chui were charged with nine counts of crimes against humanity and war crimes allegedly committed between January and March 2003 in the Ituri region of the DRC against members of the Hema people. Katanga and Chui were indicted in July 2007. Specifically, Katanga and Chui are also accused of launching a coordinated attack against the civilian population of the village of Bogoro on 24 February 2003. According to the warrants issued for Katanga and Chui, the attack included "the murder of about 200 civilians", the "imprisoning [of] civilians in a room filled with corpses", and "the sexual enslavement of several women and girls". The counts are as follows:

1. Murder, a crime against humanity in violation of article 7(1)(a) of the Rome Statute;
2. Wilful killings, a war crime in violation of article 8(2)(a)(i) of the Rome Statute;
3. Inhumane acts, a crime against humanity in violation of article 7(1)(k) of the Rome Statute;
4. Inhumane or cruel treatment, a war crime in violation of article 8(2)(a)(ii) or (c)(i) of the Rome Statute;
5. Using children to participate in hostilities, a war crime in violation of article 8(2)(b)(xxvi) of the Rome Statute;
6. Sexual slavery, a crime against humanity in violation of article 7(1)(g) of the Rome Statute;
7. Sexual slavery, a war crime in violation of article 8(2)(b)(xxii) or (e)(vi) of the Rome Statute;
8. Attack against a civilian population, a war crime in violation of article 8(2)(b)(i) or (e)(i) of the Rome Statute;
9. Pillaging, a war crime in violation of article 8(2)(b)(xvi) or (e)(v) of the Rome Statute.

On 7 March 2014, Katanga was convicted for accessory to one count of crime against humanity and four counts of war crimes. He was sentenced to 12 years' imprisonment on 23 May 2014.

Mathieu Ngudjolo Chui was acquitted, on 18 December 2012, of the charges of crimes against humanity and war crimes, and was ordered for immediate release. This verdict was upheld by the Appeals Chamber on 27 February 2015.

=== Bosco Ntaganda ===
Bosco Ntaganda is allegedly the former Deputy Chief of the General Staff of the Patriotic Forces for the Liberation of the Congo (FPLC), the military wing of the Union of Congolese Patriots (UPC). On 22 August 2006 he was charged with three counts of war crimes:

1. Enlisting children, a war crime in violation of article 8(2)(b)(xxvi) of the Rome Statute;
2. Conscription of children, a war crime in violation of article 8(2)(b)(xxvi) of the Rome Statute;
3. Using children to participate in hostilities, a war crime in violation of article 8(2)(b)(xxvi) of the Rome Statute.

On 14 July 2012, he was also charged with three crimes against humanity and four counts of war crimes:

1. Murder, a crime against humanity in violation of article 7(1)(a) of the Rome Statute;
2. Rape and sexual slavery, crimes against humanity in violation of article 7(1)(g) of the Rome Statute;
3. Persecution, a crime against humanity in violation of article 7(1)(h) of the Rome Statute;
4. Murder, a war crime in violation of article 8(2)(c)(i) of the Rome Statute;
5. Attack against the civilian population, a war crime in violation of article 8(2)(e)(i) of the Rome Statute;
6. Rape and sexual slavery, war crimes in violation of article 8(2)(e)(vi) of the Rome Statute;
7. Pillaging, a war crime in violation of article 8(2)(e)(v) of the Rome Statute.

On 8 July 2019, ICC Trial Chamber VI found Bosco Ntaganda guilty of 18 counts of war crimes and crimes against humanity, committed in Ituri, Congo, in 2002–2003. He was sentenced to 30 years of imprisonment on 7 November 2019.

On 8 March 2021 the ICC ruled that Ntaganda's victims should be compensated with US$30 million, the highest amount ever rewarded. Since Ntaganda does not have the money to pay, the Court will use its own funds to compensate victims.

=== Callixte Mbarushimana ===
Callixte Mbarushimana was allegedly executive secretary of the Democratic Forces for the Liberation of Rwanda (FDLR). He was charged with 11 criminal counts:

1. Attack against a civilian population, a war crime in violation of article 8(2)(b)(i) or (e)(i) of the Rome Statute;
2. Destruction of property, a war crime in violation of article 8(2)(a)(iv) or (e)(xii) of the Rome Statute;
3. Murder, a war crime in violation of article 8(2)(a)(i) or (c)(i) of the Rome Statute;
4. Murder, a crime against humanity in violation of article 7(1)(a) of the Rome Statute;
5. Torture, a war crime in violation of article 8(2)(a)(ii) or (c)(i) of the Rome Statute;
6. Torture, a crime against humanity in violation of article 7(1)(f) of the Rome Statute;
7. Rape, a war crime in violation of article 8(2)(b)(xxii) or (e)(vi) of the Rome Statute;
8. Rape, a crime against humanity in violation of article 7(1)(g) of the Rome Statute;
9. Inhumane acts, a crime against humanity in violation of article 7(1)(k) of the Rome Statute;
10. Inhuman treatment, a war crime in violation of article 8(2)(a)(ii) of the Rome Statute;
11. Persecution, a crime against humanity in violation of article 7(1)(h) of the Rome Statute.

On 16 December 2011, Pre-Trial Chamber I declined to confirm the charges against him. On 23 December 2011, he was released from custody. On 30 May 2012, the decision was confirmed in appeals.

=== Sylvestre Mudacumura ===
Sylvestre Mudacumura was charged with nine counts of war crimes on 12 July 2012:

1. Murder, a war crime in violation of article 8(2)(c)(i) of the Rome Statute;
2. Mutilation, a war crime in violation of article 8(2)(c)(i) of the Rome Statute;
3. Cruel treatment, a war crime in violation of article 8(2)(c)(i) of the Rome Statute;
4. Torture, a war crime in violation of article 8(2)(c)(i) of the Rome Statute;
5. Outrage upon personal dignity, a war crime in violation of article 8(2)(c)(ii) of the Rome Statute;
6. Attack against the civilian population, a war crime in violation of article 8(2)(e)(i) of the Rome Statute;
7. Pillaging, a war crime in violation of article 8(2)(e)(v) of the Rome Statute;
8. Rape, a war crime in violation of article 8(2)(e)(vi) of the Rome Statute;
9. Destruction of property, a war crime in violation of article 8(2)(e)(xii) of the Rome Statute.

Mudacumura is not within ICC custody, and the case against him remains at pre-trial.

== Court proceedings ==
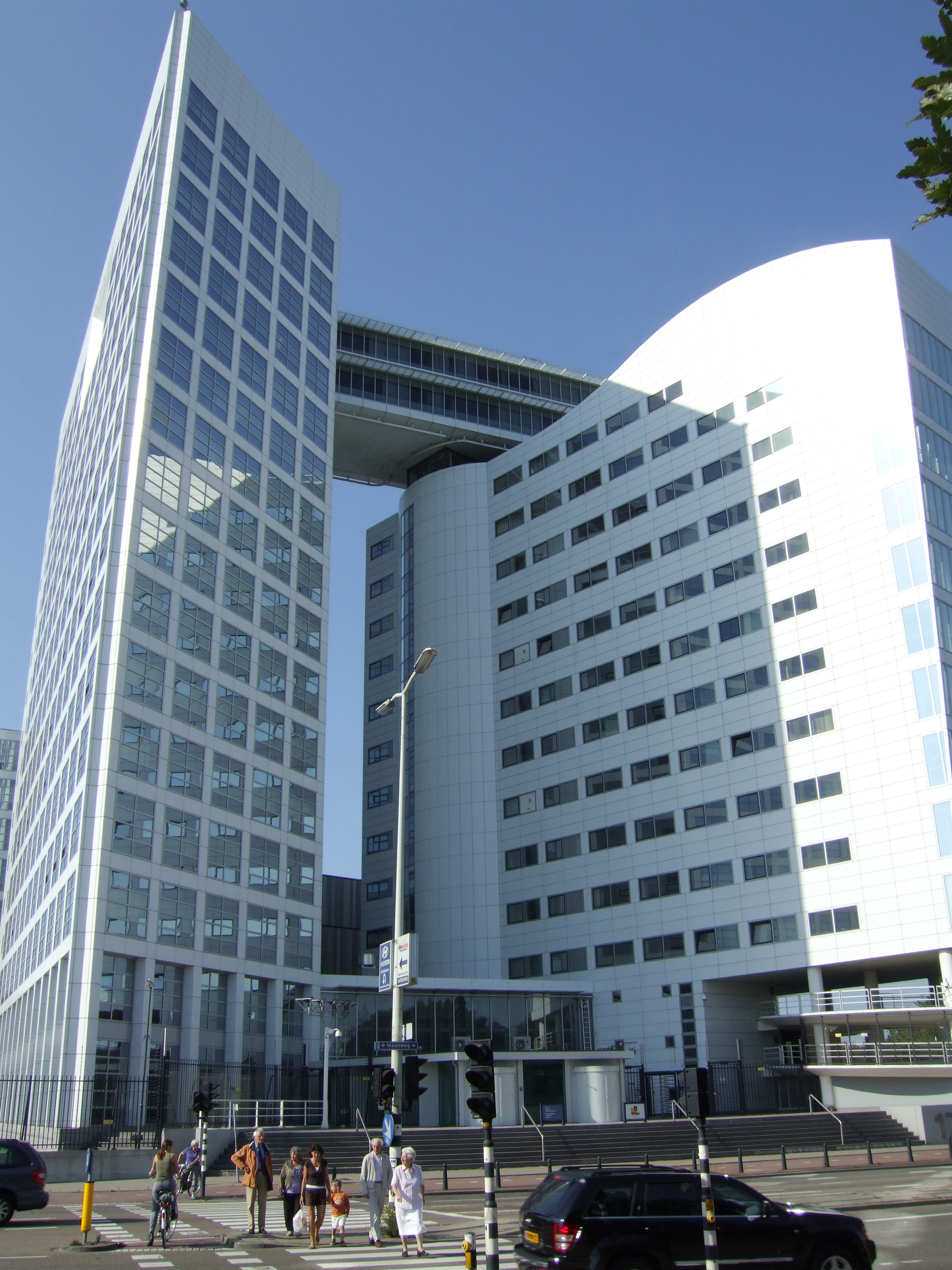
The ICC's temporary headquarters in The Hague

The prosecution of the five suspects was separated into four cases. Germain Katanga and Mathieu Ngudjolo Chui were tried together and the other three suspects we're tried individually. The trial of Bosco Ntaganda started in September 2015. At this moment, Sylvestre Mudacumura was still not arrested.

=== The Prosecutor v. Thomas Lubanga Dyilo ===
The Prosecutor applied for a warrant for Lubanga Dyilo's arrest on 12 January 2006 and the warrant was issued under seal on 10 February 2006. Lubanga Dyilo was already in a Kinshasa prison when the warrant was issued in connection with the killing of nine Bangladeshi peacekeepers from the United Nations Organization Stabilization Mission in the Democratic Republic of the Congo. Congolese authorities surrendered Lubanga Dyilo to the ICC on 17 March 2006, he was transferred to the ICC detention centre in The Hague, and he made his initial appearance before the Court on 20 March 2006. His confirmation of charges hearing took place from 9 to 28 November 2006 and Pre-Trial Chamber I confirmed the charges on 29 January 2007.

Before the trial against Lubanga Dyilo started, the Pre-Trial Chamber halted proceedings and ordered Dyilo released on grounds that the prosecutor had failed to disclose evidence to the defence. In a subsequent ruling the chamber reversed its previous decision and allowed the trial to begin. Additionally, the senior trial lawyer, prosecutor Ekkehard Withopf, was removed from the case only a month before the trial started. Lubanga Dyilo's trial began on 26 January 2009 but on 8 July 2010 the Trial Chamber once again stayed the proceedings because of the conduct of the prosecutor and ordered him released. Following a successful appeal by the prosecutor the order to release Lubanga Dyilo was reversed and the trial resumed. Closing arguments concluded on 26 August 2011. In 2012, Lubanga was found guilty and sentenced to 14 years imprisonment.

=== The Prosecutor v. Germain Katanga and Mathieu Ngudjolo Chui ===
The prosecutor applied for warrants for the arrest of Katanga and Chui on 25 June 2007 and they were issued by Pre-Trial Chamber I on 2 July and 6 July, both under seal. Katanga was arrested in the DRC and was surrendered to the Court on 17 October 2007. Chui was arrested on 6 February 2008 and surrendered to the court the following day. Katanga had his initial hearing at the court on 22 October 2007 while Chui first appeared on 11 February 2008. The confirmation of charges hearing took place between 27 June and 18 July 2008 and the charges were confirmed by Pre-Trial Chamber I on 26 September 2008. The trial of Katanga and Chui began on 24 November 2009 and concluded on 23 May 2012. Chui was acquitted, and Katanga was convicted of murder and pillage over a deadly attack on Bogoro.

=== The Prosecutor v. Bosco Ntaganda ===
The Prosecutor applied for a warrant for Ntaganda's arrest on 12 January 2006. The warrant was issued on 22 August 2006 under seal and subsequently unsealed on 28 April 2008. Ntaganga is currently at large as a fugitive. Since being indicted, Ntaganda had become a general in the Congolese armed forces and (despite the fact that there was an international warrant for his arrest) still lived openly in the Kivu region of the eastern DRC until he turned himself into the U.S. Embassy in Rwanda on 18 March 2013.

=== The Prosecutor v. Callixte Mbarushimana ===
The Prosecutor applied for a warrant for Callixte Mbarushimana's arrest on 20 August 2010 and it was issued under seal on 28 September 2010. Mbarushiman was arrested by French authorities in Paris on 11 October 2010. He was then transferred to the Court's detention centre in The Hague. His confirmation of charges hearing took place between 16 and 21 September 2011. and on 16 December 2011 the judges of Pre-Trial Chamber I by a 2–1 majority declined to confirm the charges and ordered Mbarushimana's release from custody. Judge Sanji Mmasenono Monageng, the presiding judge, dissented.

== See also ==
- International Criminal Court investigation in Uganda
