= Sexual violence in the Democratic Republic of the Congo =

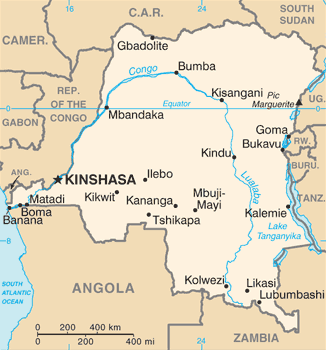
The map of Democratic Republic of Congo from the CIA World Factbook

The Democratic Republic of the Congo, and the east of the country in particular, has been described as the "Rape Capital of the World", and the prevalence and intensity of all forms of sexual violence has been described as the worst in the world. Human Rights Watch defines sexual violence as "an act of a sexual nature by force, or by threat of force or coercion", and rape as "a form of sexual violence during which the body of a person is invaded, resulting in penetration, however slight, of any part of the body of the victim, with a sexual organ, or of the anal or genital opening of the victim with any object or other part of the body."

The Democratic Republic of the Congo has had a long history of unrest and instability. Although sexual violence has always occurred in the DRC in some capacity, increased rates of sexual violence coincided with the armed conflicts of the early 1990s and later.

Much of the research conducted about sexual violence in the DRC has focused on violence against and rape of women as related to these armed conflicts, mostly occurring in the eastern region of the country. The eastern region of the DRC has the highest rates of sexual violence, and much of it is perpetrated by armed militia groups. However, other studies have begun to show that sexual violence is pervasive in all parts of the DRC and that it is not always related to the conflict.

While there is extensive evidence of the societal and individual ramifications caused by the sexual violence in the country, the government has been criticized for not doing enough to stop it. Although Congolese law criminalizes many forms of sexual violence, these laws are not always enforced.

== Historical background ==
Rape in the Democratic Republic of Congo has frequently been described as a "weapon of war", and the United Nations officially declared rape a weapon of war in 2008. War rape makes a particularly effective weapon because it not only destroys its physical victims, but entire communities as well. War, violence, and instability have ravaged the DRC for decades, and this has led to a culture of violence in war and civilian life that often takes its form in a sexual nature.

Eleven years after the Republic of the Congo gained independence in 1960, president Mobutu renamed the country Zaire in 1971 and ruled the nation under an autocratic and corrupt regime. Under Mobutu's regime, sexual abuse was used as a method of torture.

Mobutu ruled until 1997, when after the 1994 Rwandan genocide, many génocidaires fled across Rwanda's western border into the DRC in hopes of escaping censure. Hutu extremist militias were reformed across the border, particularly in Kivu, the DRC's easternmost region, bringing crime and violence to the DRC. While the Congolese army and UN peacekeepers attempted to launch large operations, they still ultimately failed to disarm Hutu rebels who often retaliated by performing rapes, kidnappings and murders. This influx of militants and fighting in Burundi catalyzed the First Congo War and the end of Mobutu's regime. Spurred by the violence, the Alliance of Democratic Forces for the Liberation of Congo (AFDL), led by Laurent Kabila, launched a rebellion against Mobutu regime in 1996 in the eastern part of the country.

Wilhelmine Ntakebuka, who coordinates a sexual violence program in Bukavu, believes that the increase in sexual violence started with the inflow of foreign militants:

The epidemic of rapes seems to have started in the mid-1990s. That coincides with the waves of Hutu militiamen who escaped into Congo's forests after exterminating 800,000 Tutsis and moderate Hutus during Rwanda's genocide 13 years ago. Mr. Holmes said that while government troops might have raped thousands of women, the most vicious attacks had been carried out by Hutu militias.

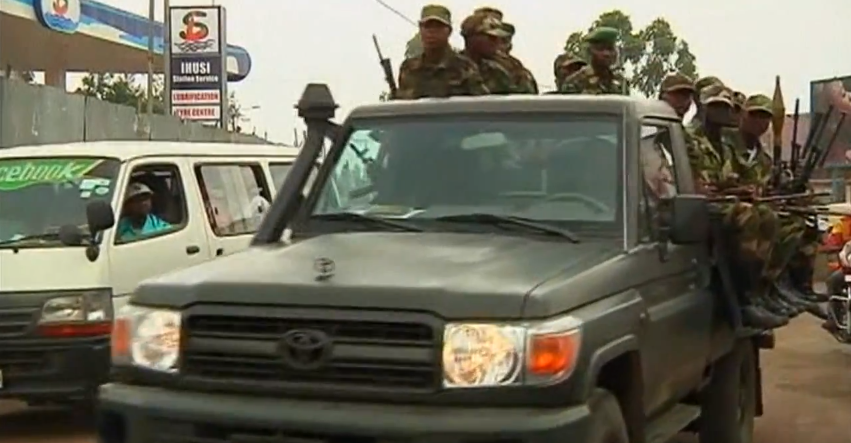
M23 rebels in Goma, November 2012

The violence from the First Congo War led to the Second Congo War, which officially ended in 2006 with the election of the first democratically elected president, Joseph Kabila. However, there has been no end to the violence. A major confrontation in 2007 between government forces and troops of Tutsi general Laurent Nkunda culminated in another major confrontation in the eastern province of Nord-Kivu. Recently, instability and violence have greatly increased since the mutiny of members of the Government of DRC and the creation of the rebel movement, M23, supported by the Government of Rwanda and individuals of the Government of Uganda. Moreover, as recently as December 2012, the UN accused M23 rebels of raping and killing civilians in eastern DRC. There have also recently been allegations of a military attack and 72 counts of rapes against civilians by M23 in the Minova area.

Much of this continuing violence is a result of long-lasting animosity between the Tutsis, the Hutus, and other groups. Other factors of the continued violence are control of land, control of minerals, and economic tensions. The persistence of rape can also be attributed to misconceptions about rape, such as the myth that having sex with prepubescent girls will give people strength in battle or business dealings. The long history of violence has led to a culture of desensitization, lacking respect for international norms of human rights, and inadequate education.

Today, the Democratic Republic of the Congo, particularly the eastern region of the country, is known as the rape capital of the world. While "the law specifically prohibits and provides penalties of 10 to 20 years' imprisonment for child and forced prostitution, pimping, and trafficking for sexual exploitation....There were no reported investigations or prosecutions of traffickers during the year [2007]." There is no law against spousal sexual assault.

== Forms of sexual violence ==
=== Violence against women ===
Margot Wallström dubbed eastern Congo the "most dangerous place on earth to be a woman" and it is said that rape is simply a fact of life in the DRC. In October 2004 the human rights group Amnesty International said that 40,000 cases of rape had been reported over the previous six years, the majority occurring in South Kivu. This is an incomplete count, as the humanitarian and international organizations compiling the figures do not have access to much of the conflict area; only women who have reported for treatment are included. It is estimated that there are as many as 200,000 surviving rape victims living in the Democratic Republic of the Congo today.

A 2011 report recorded that 1,000 women had been raped daily.

A 2014 report by human rights charity Freedom from Torture outlined the usage of rape as a form of torture by security forces, focusing on case studies and accounts from torture survivors.

In 2023, the UN reported over 113,000 sexual violence cases in DRC and by the following year of 2024, conflicted related cases doubled.

According to research conducted by The Journal of the American Medical Association in 2010, 39.7% of women in the Eastern Region (North Kivu, South Kivu, and Province Orientale) of the DRC reported to have been exposed to sexual violence during their lifetime, most commonly taking its form in rape.

As Noel Rwabirinba, a sixteen-year-old who had been a militiaman for two years said, "If we see girls, it's our right...we can violate them." This statement reflects the normalization of rape in the DRC. Because of conflicts, between 60 and 90 percent of women are single heads of households. This puts many burdens upon them, such as having to travel long distances to find resources, leaving them vulnerable to violence.

Patricia Rozée identifies different categories of rape, all of which occur in the DRC: punitive rape (used to punish to elicit silence and control); status rape (occurring as a result of acknowledged differences in rank); ceremonial rape (undertaken as part of socially sanctioned rituals); exchange rape (when genital contact is used as a bargaining tool); theft rape (involuntary abduction of individuals as slaves, prostitutes, concubines, or spoils of war); and survival rape (when women become involved with older men to secure goods needed to survive).

Rape, as related to the conflicts, is the most prevalent form of sexual violence in the country, particularly in the eastern region. However, civilians are also the perpetrators of rape. Furthermore, although people might assume that men always perpetrate conflict-related sexual violence against women, women are also perpetrators. In the 2010 study conducted by the American Medical Association, women reported to have perpetrated conflict-related sexual violence in 41.1% of female cases and 10.0% of male cases.

=== Violence against men and boys ===
The rape of men is also common. More studies are coming out to show that both women and men are the victims and perpetrators of sexual violence in the DRC.

Research conducted by the Journal of the American Medical Association in 2010 cites that 23.6% of men in the Eastern Region of the country have been exposed to sexual violence. And, a similar study also conducted in 2010 found that 22% of men (as compared to 30% of women) in eastern Congo reported conflict-related sexual violence. A cross-sectional, population-based study found that one in four men living in the eastern region of the country have been the victims of sexual violence. Moreover, at least 4 to 10 percent of all rape victims are male.

The prevalence of rape of men in the country is likely underreported due to extreme stigma attached to sexual abuse of males. Men who admit to being raped risk ostracism by their community and criminal prosecution, because they may be seen as homosexual, which, though legal in the DRC, is socially unacceptable. Male victims are less likely to appear in court, and those who do are cast away in their villages and called "bush wives". According to Denise Siwatula, a programme officer at the Women's Synergy for the Victims of Sexual Violence based in Kivu, many men are victims of sexual violence and they need different assistance than women who come to their center.

Lynn Lawry, a humanitarian expert at the International Health Division of the US Department of Defense, said, "When we are looking at how we are going to address communities, we need to talk to female perpetrators as well as male perpetrators, and we have to include male survivors in our mental health clinics in order to address their issues, which may be very different from female survivors."

The 2020 report by the United Nations Secretary General on conflict related sexual violence covered that a young man from Tanganyika Province was stripped naked, raped and coerced by Twa militia to rape his own mother that led to severe sense of shame and the fear of stigmatization and reprisals for seeking support. Raping of men and boys have been used for degrading societal identities—by attacking family and community "protective" figures through humiliation and ultimately inflicting identity-based vulnerabilities. The report also covered the continuation of sexual violence against men and boys in detention and in several settings.

=== Violence against children ===
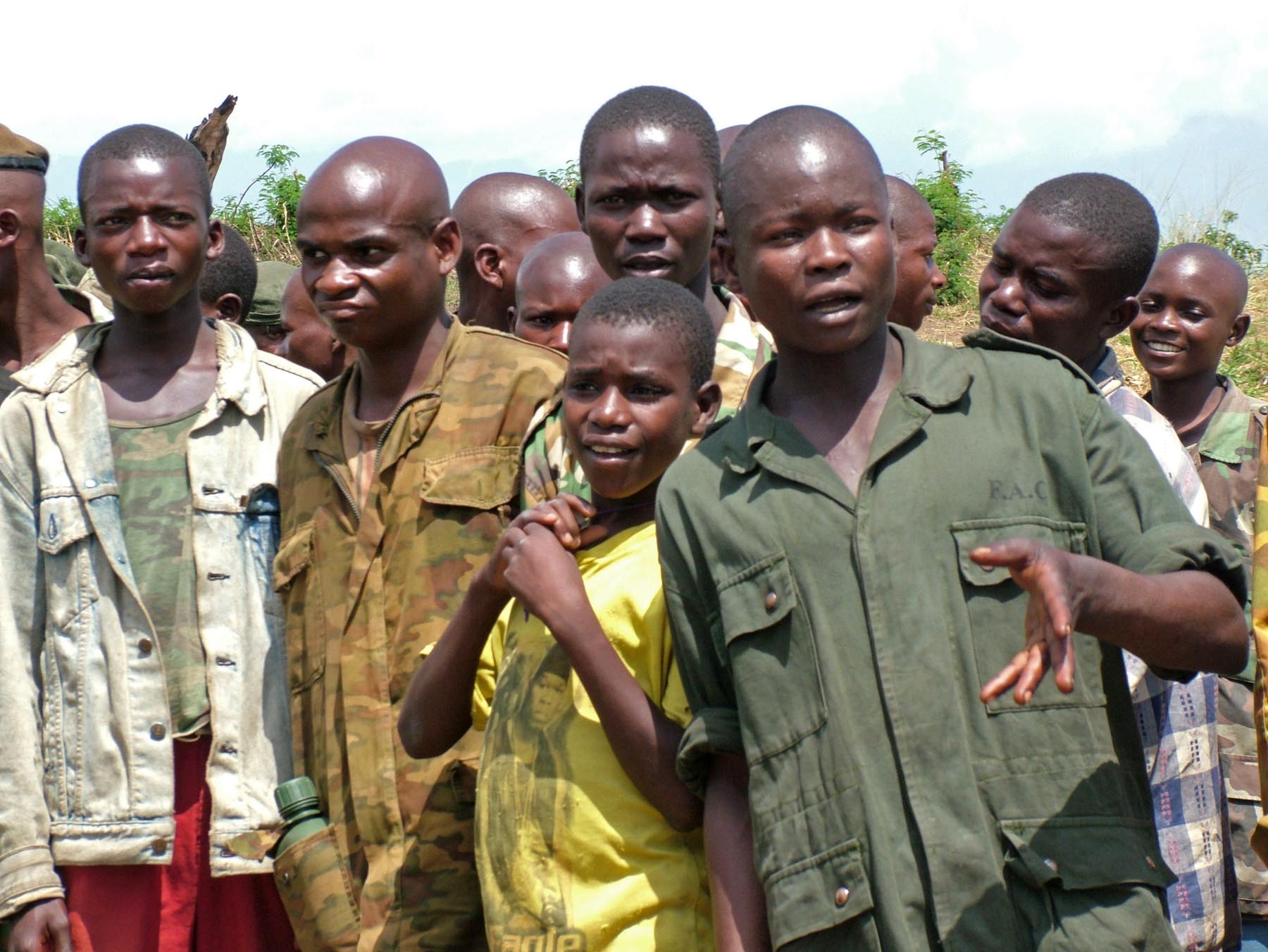
A group of demobilized child soldiers in the Democratic Republic of the Congo

UNFPA reported that over 65% of victims during the past 15 years were children. The majority of this percentage was adolescent girls and roughly 10% of child victims are said to be under 10 years old. Many child soldiers, after being recruited from refugee camps, are often sexually abused.

Rape of girls and gender-based violence of minors is widespread in the eastern Congo.

=== Rape ===
Sexual violence functions as a means of humiliating, not only a female victim, but also her family and/or husband. Once raped, the victim traditionally sends a message to her husband to alert him about the event. He then arms himself and searches for the rapist. Today, most communities also stigmatize women and hold them accountable for being raped. The influx of armed groups from Burundi and Rwanda into the DRC has impacted the frequency of sexual violence in the region.

After the wars of 1996 and 1998 and the displacement of Congolese people, women were forced to turn to "survival sex" with wealthy foreign soldiers and UN peacekeepers. This was seen as emasculating the soldiers who were unable to live up to their expected societal roles. Objectified rape became the expected order in the DRC. According to healthcare providers, women are commonly subjected to sexual violence related to the conflict as they flee their residences and encounter diverse armed groups, such as militias, rebels, and the FARDC, on their way to refugee settlements.

Many rapes occur in public spaces and in the presence of witnesses. These public rapes have become so popular that they have been given a name – "la reigne". During these rapes, women are stripped, tied upside down, and gang raped in the middle of a village. The permission to invade and rape a village is often given as a reward to the armed group by the commanders. The government army, FARDC, due to its size and capacity, is the largest perpetrator.

==== "National security" rape ====
This form of rape is predominately used by governments and militaries to protect its "national security". Additionally, "national security" rape violently imposes many intersecting and mutually fundamental power relations such as nationalism and patriarchy. It is used to humiliate, torture, and punish "rebellious" women for directly challenging what the rapists view as strictly enshrined ideas of femininity and masculinity.

==== "Systematic mass" rape ====
The systematic rape of women in the DRC is regarded as a tool of oppression focused on a specific ethnic group and is generalized through terror that is justified through established national discourses. During times of war, mass rape can be seen as an effective way to "feminize" one's enemy by violating "his women, nation and homeland", thus proving that he is incapable of being an adequate protector. The raping of women in this process seeks to destroy the very "fabric of society, as women are seen as the symbolic bearers of ethno-national identity because of their roles as biological, cultural, and social reproducers of society itself".

=== Other forms of sexual violence ===
The United Nations includes rape, public rapes, sexual slavery, forced prostitution, forced pregnancy, gang rape, forced incest, sexual mutilation, disemboweling, genital mutilation, cannibalism, deliberate spread of HIV/AIDS, and forced sterilization as other forms of sexual violence that occur in the DRC that are used as techniques in war against the civilian population.

Other forms of sexual violence reported include: forcing of crude objects such as tree branches and bottles into the vagina, public rape in front of the family and community, forced rape between victims, the introduction of objects into the victims' cavities, pouring melted rubber into women's vaginas, shooting women in the vagina and inducing abortions using sharp objects.

=== Trafficking and prostitution ===
The Democratic Republic of the Congo is a source and destination for trafficking for forced labor and forced prostitution, much of which is internal and perpetrated by armed groups in the eastern region of the DRC. The DRC is said to be the main regional source, from which women and children are trafficked in large numbers to sex industries in Angola, South Africa, Republic of Congo, and western Europe, particularly Belgium. Prostitution and forced prostitution occurs often in refugee camps in the country. In addition to forced prostitution in refugee camps, many girls are forced into prostitution in tent- or hut-based brothels, markets, and mining areas.

The main perpetrators are the Democratic Forces for the Liberation of Rwanda (FDLR), Patriotes Resistants Congolais (PARECO), various local militia (such as the Mai-Mai), the Alliance des patriots pour un Congo libre et souverain (APCLS), and the Lord's Resistance Army (LRA). There are many reports of these groups forcibly recruiting women and children to serve in sexual servitude.

=== Domestic violence ===
Article 444 of the Congo Family Code states that a wife "owes her obedience to her husband". Marital rape is not considered an offense in the DRC. Similar laws and attitudes are prevalent in countries involved in the DRC conflict. In Zimbabwe one in four women report having experienced sexual violence at the hands of their husbands. Women in the DRC do not have the right to refuse sex, and should they, men have the right to discipline their wives through beating, an act often referred to as "tough love".

Research Directorate has called domestic violence "very prevalent" in the Democratic Republic of the Congo. According to several studies conducted in 2011, intimate partner sexual violence is the most pervasive form of violence against women in all areas of the DRC. A 2010 study concluded that intimate partner violence was reported by 31% of women and 17% of men.

Central factors for the high rates of domestic violence are the reintegration of combatants in communities, circulation of arms, and post-traumatic stress in times during and after conflict. However, reporting domestic violence is rare because women have no rights to share property or wealth, fear losing their children or being shunned by the community, or may not even know it is a punishable offense.

Although there are laws against domestic violence, cultural beliefs make it extremely difficult to implement the rules. Because the social status of African women is dependent on their marital status, and because the conflict has drastically reduced the male population, women have no choice but to suffer. Although the status of men is also dependent on their marital status, they are expected to exercise strict control over the wives. Men are seen as being superior in that they are better educated and capable of purchasing property.

== Perpetrators ==
=== Militia groups ===
According to Human Rights Watch, while many of the perpetrators of sexual violence are militia groups, some of whom have been known to kidnap women and girls and use them as sex slaves; the Congolese army, Forces Armées de la République Démocratique du Congo (FARDC), is the "single largest group of perpetrators".

In 2007, the United Nations Organization Stabilization Mission in the Democratic Republic of the Congo (MONUSCO) reported that 54% of all recorded sexual violence cases in the first 6 months of that year were committed by FARDC soldiers. Some commanders have been purported to overlook sexual violence perpetrated by those under their command. One investigation found that some commanders ordered their soldiers to commit rape. There are also incidents of rape involving the police, others in authority, civilians, and other opportunistic criminals.

View of masculinity which associate manliness with excessive use of aggression, force and violence contribute to military and militia sexual violence. Weapons are used as status symbols and to acquire social and economic hierarchy by employing power over unarmed civilians. Soldiers who exude any qualities deemed to be feminine are seen as weak and often end up being attacked and ostracized.

Many societies, such as the Democratic Republic of Congo generally place the means of violence – military training, and weapons – in the hands of men, while promoting a direct link between the idea of a real man and the practice of dominance and violence.

==== Background ====
Beginning with colonization, economic factors have contributed to the culture of violence that has dominated the DRC. In 1908, under King Leopold II, the "methodical rape of entire villages" was a popular tactic used by his administration for keeping the local population in order.

After gaining independence in 1960, the Democratic Republic of Congo was marked by political and social instability. In 1965, during a coup, Colonel Joseph Mobutu took over and remained in power for the next 32 years.

During the 1990s, Mobutu's regime witnessed a large influx of refugees after the Rwandan genocide, many of which included genocide perpetrators. The perpetrators were able to rearm themselves and were immediately organized by ex-(FARDC) Armed Forces of the Democratic Republic of Congo leaders. In an effort to prevent future attacks from the newly formed group, Rwandan Patriotic Front (RPF) soldiers joined together with (AFDL) Alliance of Democratic Forces for the Liberation of Congo-Zaire forces under the leadership of Congolese rebel commander, Laurent Desire Kabila. The group was responsible for killing thousands of unarmed civilians.

In 2001, after the assassination of his father, Joseph Kabila took over as leader. A rebellion erupted in the same year. As a result, an estimated 4 million people died in the competition for control over the DRC's natural resources. Attempts to stabilize the peace process have failed. Insecurity is perpetuated by the remaining militia groups, which include the Mai-Mai.

=== Civilian perpetrators ===
In June 2010, UK aid group Oxfam reported a dramatic increase in the number of rapes occurring in the Democratic Republic of the Congo. Contrary to MONUSCO's 2007 report, the study found that 38% of rapes were committed by civilians in 2008. Rapes by civilians are increasing, demonstrating that sexual violence is becoming even more widespread throughout the country. This is a particularly dramatic rise compared to the number of civilian-perpetrated rapes in 2004, which was less than 1%. Researchers from Harvard discovered that rapes committed by civilians had increased seventeenfold. Consistent with these studies is a statement from Dr. Margaret Agama, the DRC's United Nations Population Fund (UNFPA) representative:

Initially, rape was used as a tool of war by all the belligerent forces involved in the country's recent conflicts, but now sexual violence is unfortunately not only perpetrated by armed factions but also by ordinary people occupying positions of authority, neighbours, friends and family members.

=== Teachers ===
A survey by the Brazil-based nonprofit organization Promundo found that 16% of girls in North Kivu said they had been forced to have sex with their teachers. And according to a 2010 UNICEF report, 46% of Congolese schoolgirls in a national study confirmed that they had been victims of sexual harassment, abuse, and violence committed by their teachers or other school personnel.

=== Female perpetrators ===
A 2010 survey in over 1,000 households in eastern Congo by a team of researchers led by Harvard academic Lynn Lawry asked victims of sexual violence to specify their assailant's gender. The study found that 40% of the female victims and 10% of male victims said they have been assaulted by a woman. A UN expert on armed groups states, "Women who were raped for years are now raping other women."

=== Violence in Angola ===
Congolese women are being systematically raped in Angola as a means of expelling the Congolese living there. With a booming mining trade, Congolese continue migrating into Angola in search of a living. Among some 26,000 people expelled since April 2011, more than 21,000 cases of serious human rights violations, including rape, beating, torture and looting, have been documented by an Italian aid agency that has a UN grant to monitor the border. Human Rights Watch says the goal of the abuse is to instill fear.

== Minova Trial ==
The Minova Trial was a military court proceeding held in the Democratic Republic of the Congo (DRC) from February to May 2014. Members of the Armed Forces of the Democratic Republic of the Congo (FARDC) were prosecuted for mass rapes and other crimes committed against civilians in the town of Minova in November of 2012. After the retreat of government forces after the M23 rebel group had captured the city of Goma, soldiers engages in a 10-day period of violence from November 20th-30th 2012. During this period, at least 76 women and girls were raped, but estimates suggest the actual number of victims exceeds 1,000 individuals. While the proceedings attracted significant international attention and support, the verdict delivered on May 5 2014, resulted in only two low-level soldiers being convicted of rape, with all high-ranking acquitted, leading to widespread disappointment among victims and human rights advocates. The trial's minimal outcomes highlighted the continuous challenges facing the DRC's justice system, particularly the political nature of human rights trials and the difficulty of holding senior officers accountable.

=== Background and Context ===
==== November 2012 Violence ====
In April of 2012, armed conflict erupted in the province of North Kivu, located in eastern Congo, between the Congolese army and the M23 rebel group. With support from Rwandan military officials, M23 gained control of much of Rutshuru and Nyiragongo territories by July 2012. On November 20, 2012, M23 seized the city of Goma. After the fall of the city, several Congolese army battalions received orders to retreat to the town of Minova to reorganize.

Human Rights Watch documented at least 76 cases of rape of women and girls by soldiers from November 20th to November 30th in Minova and nearby villages. It was estimated more than 1,000 women, children, and men were raped in Minova during this period alone. However, only 37 soldiers ultimately faced rape charges.

Several women described a recurrent pattern of attack. The soldiers in official army uniforms force their way into homes at night, pointed guns at them, demanded, money, and committed rapes while other soldiers took goods that families had received through aid from organizations. In many cases, when husbands learned of the rapes, they subsequently abandoned their wives.

Sexual Violence in the DRC Context

Members of military groups have been identified as the main perpetrators of sexual violence in the DRC, where sexual violence frequently leads to social and especially familial exclusion. Soldiers' explanations of why rape occurs in the DRC armed forces must be understood in relation to notions of different masculinities within the increasingly globalized context of soldiering, in which rape becomes normalized in warspaces.

The integration of former rebel groups into the national armed forces has repeatedly undermined peace and stability efforts in the DRC. This creates an environment where sexual violence persists despite existing legal frameworks.

=== Trial Proceedings ===
==== Trial Structure and Location ====
Between February 12th and 19th, 2014, a temporary courtroom was set up in a Catholic school auditorium in Minova to hear victim testimonies. Trials were normally held in Goma, but for victims the trip would have been expensive, so they brought the court to them. 39 FARDC soldiers were placed on trial under charges relating to violence committed during the ten-day period. Of those accused, 25 were lower-ranked soldiers and 12 were officers. All but four of the accused sat in the trial room, the missing four were still on active duty in the DRC.

Judges and prosecutors directly applied the Rome Statute of the International Criminal Court to compensate for gaps in domestic laws. This approach allowed the court to utilize international legal standards, like provisions on war crimes and responsibilities.

Victim Participation and Protection

Victims were often very reluctant to step forward due to the stigma placed onto rape victims by Congolese society. Only 47 victims testified despite the much higher estimated number of survivors. The victims who did testify wore head coverings, gowns, and veils designed to keep them anonymous, with cloth sometimes covering their heads as they testified. Women were referred to by numbers instead of names to maintain anonymity. Some testified behind curtains to further shield them from their abusers. These kinds of protection methods were provided according to statues of the International Criminal Court.

Many women had symptoms of post-traumatic stress disorder. Psychologists worked to calm women before their testimony, with some experiencing flashbacks, anger, vomiting, headaches, and sweating when talking about their experiences.

Investigation and Prosecution Challenges

There were many different army battalions and thousands of soldiers located in Minova at the time of the crimes. This makes it incredibly difficult to identify individual perpetrators. Commanders were replaced just before the retreat to Minova and individual soldiers were a mess outside of their regular units. No evidence emerged that soldiers had been ordered or encourages to rape and pillage homes, but commanders failed to control their troops and to prevent, stop, or punish crimes.

The timing of the investigation was also difficult because of the political state of the DRC at that time. The conflict with the M23 rebels continued as investigations started, and many believed the trial would harm soldier morale. In December of 2013, when the case was rushed to trial due to international pressure, the elite commanders in Minova were already being touted as national heroes for defeating the M23 rebels.

The prosecution's case was weak due to the shortage of legal expertise in handling these cases, and an inability to gather strong evidence against the soldiers.

=== Verdict and Outcomes ===
==== Convictions and Acquittals ====
The trial verdict given by the Operational Military Court in Goma on May 5, 2014 resulted in only two low-ranking soldiers being convicted for rape. High-level commanders who had overall responsibility for the troops in Minova were never charged, and other low-ranking officers were acquitted of their charges.

Of the 39 defendants, two soldiers were sentenced to life in prison for rape, and 24 were convicted of pillaging. 13 soldiers were acquitted of all charges. A number of soldiers were convicted of the war crime of pillage, despite the lack of evidence against them for that crime.

Reparations

The judges ordered reparations to be paid by the Congolese state to the victims of rape, pillage, and murder. However, these have not been given out. Nearly all victims lost their cases on the basis that they were unable to identify the perpetrators. This information eliminated any chance of demanding reparations.

International Reaction

The verdict created widespread disappointment from international observers, human rights activists, and the victims. Human Rights Watch stated that the Minova rape trial was a huge disappointment for the victims of one of the worst mass rapes in the country in recent years.

=== Aftermath and Continuing Issues ===
==== Lack of Justice ====
Victims expressed deep dissatisfaction with the trial's outcomes. The verdict failed to deliver the accountability and justice that victims had hoped for when they came forward to testify.

Ongoing Violence

Despite the trial, armed groups, including M23, have continued to commit atrocities in eastern DRC. The limited accountability achieved through the Minova trial has not served as a significant deterrent to prevent ongoing sexual violence in the region.

African Commission Decision

In April 2025, the African Commission on Human and Peoples' Rights urged the DRC to immediately prosecute and punish perpetrators of the Minova violations. This was caused after the commission received a petition in October of 2018 signed by 1,016 victims. The Commission found DRC in violation of numerous human rights protected under the African Charter.

== Ramifications ==
=== Medical ramifications ===
The medical repercussions of the sexual assault in the DRC vary from severed and broken limbs, burned flesh, rectovaginal and vesicovaginal fistulas, STIs, pregnancy, and urinary incontinence to death. Adequate medical care for these injuries is very hard to come by, and many survivors remain ill or disfigured for the rest of their lives.

These are all more severe the younger the victim is. Young girls who are not fully developed are more likely to suffer from obstructed birth, which can lead to fistulas or even death. On a young girl, a pelvis "[has not] yet grown large enough to accommodate the baby's head, a common occurrence with young teenagers...[these girls end] up in obstructed birth, with the baby stuck inside [their] birth passage[s]...[often, they cannot] walk or stand, a consequence of nerve damage that is a frequent by-product of fistulae."

At the Doctors on Call for Service/Heal Africa Hospital in Eastern DRC, 4,715 of the women reported having suffered sexual violence; 4,009 received medical treatment; 702 had a fistula, 63.4% being traumatic and 36.6% being obstetric. During 2022, healthcare facilities experienced 159 assaults, which resulted in either a reduction of services or complete closures lasting as long as a month. The targeting of medical centers has severely limited the availability of crucial aid, especially for those who have experienced sexual and gender-based violence.

Sexual assault has also contributed to the HIV rate. Before the conflict in 1997, only 5% of the population was HIV positive; by 2002, there was a 20% HIV positive rate in the eastern region. A study conducted found that sociocultural barriers and strict obedience to Vatican doctrine prevented adolescents from receiving condoms or comprehensive sex education, which contributes to the spread of HIV.

=== Psychological and social ramifications ===
There are also many psychological and social consequences to being the victim of sexual violence. Victims often suffer from posttraumatic stress disorder (PTSD), depression, and suicide. This can be particularly severe in cases in which men have been forced at gunpoint to sexually assault their daughters, sisters, or mothers. Psychological trauma after experiencing sexual violence can have a negative effect on sexual behavior and relationships, feelings about sex, ability to negotiate safer sex, and increased likelihood of drug abuse.

The most common social consequence for victims of sexual violence is isolation from their families and communities. Raped women are seen as impure, frequently leading to their being abandoned by their husbands or having trouble marrying. The most extreme versions of this stigmatization can lead to "honor killings" in which the victim of sexual violence is murdered by her family or community due to the belief that she has brought them shame and dishonor.

Young women and girls who are cast outside of their homes, or leave due to shame will most likely become even more vulnerable to further abuse. Moreover, the culture of widespread violence often affects children at an early age. Sexual violence is also perpetrated by minors, particularly among those involved with combatant forces. A previous child soldier of the Mai-Mai fighters' movement, who fought to resist the Interahamwe from Rwanda who took refuge in the DRC after they fled from the Rwandan Patriotic Front, said that reasons that child soldiers and other combatants rape women include: listening to witch doctors' advice, drug use, long periods in bush, gaining sexual experience, punishment, revenge, and a weapon of war.

In the context of the Congolese society, rape is considered to be an "act of marriage" to the perpetrator. A girl who becomes pregnant as a result of abuse is no longer viewed as a child who needs the care and affection of her parents.

Many women and girls report extreme poverty, being unable to continue with school and an inability to earn a living and pay fees. Additionally, women declare that they are unable to find jobs because of the physical pain and injuries caused by the abuse.

== Regional differences ==
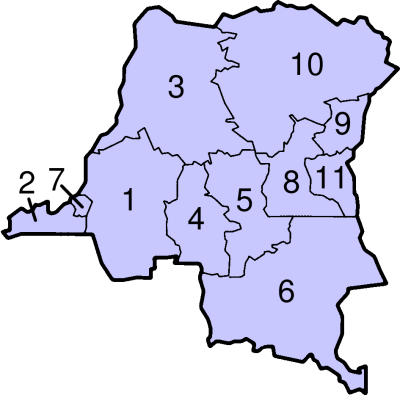

1. Bandundu
2. Bas-Congo
3. Équateur
4. Kasai-Occidental
5. Kasai-Oriental
6. Katanga
7. Kinshasa (city-province)
8. Maniema
9. North Kivu
10. Orientale
11. South Kivu
- An Ituri Interim Administration also exists in the Ituri region of Orientale Province

Several reports claim that there are no accurate representative numbers on the prevalence of sexual violence in the DRC because of underreporting and lack of research. Moreover, so far, there are no reports to indicate differences in rates of sexual violence based upon education, income, or residence (urban or rural). However, other research studies have found regional differences in rates and types of sexual violence in the DRC.

According to research done by the American Journal of Public Health in 2011, the highest rates of rape against women occurred in the North Kivu province. The war-torn and mineral-rich areas in the eastern part of the country have very high rates of sexual violence. M23 has recently gained control of territory in North Kivu, the city of Goma, and other areas of the Ruthuru region, and there have been recent reports of sexual violence in those areas.

Anthony Gambino, mission director for the Congo of the United States Agency for International Development, has also said that "shockingly high rape statistics are found in western Congo as well as northern and eastern Congo," but that conflict-related rape is less prevalent in the west. Although most reports agree that sexual violence related to the armed conflict are most prevalent in North and South Kivu, Maniema, and Katanga, one report found that the highest number of rapes reported in 2007 by women aged 15 to 49 was in the provinces of Orientale, North Kivu and Équateur. They found that sexual violence not related to the armed conflict, such as in Équateur, often takes its form in intimate-partner violence.

== Preventative efforts ==
Increasing awareness regarding the problem of sexual violence in the DRC has led to both national and international efforts to prevent the continuation of the atrocities taking place.

=== Government policy ===
According to articles of the Constitution of the Democratic Republic of the Congo, sexual violence is defined and criminalized as a form of gender-based violence and gender discrimination (article 14); a cruel, degrading, and inhuman treatment (article 16); a crime against humanity (article 15); and a violation of an individual's right to peace (article 52). Congolese law draws a distinction between rape and systematic rape, sexual violence being a crime against the state and systematic sexual violence as an international crime.

In 2006, the Palais du Peuple, the Congolese government, enacted sexual violence amendments to the 1940 Penal Code and the 1959 Penal Procedure Code. Part of these changes was criminalizing "insertion of an object into a woman's vagina, sexual mutilation, and sexual slavery" as well as defining "any sexual relation with a minor as statutory rape." The Congolese government's department, The Ministry of Gender, Family Affairs and Children, is dedicated to dealing with sexual violence within the nation.

=== International community and nongovernmental organizations ===
International human rights organizations began to document sexual violence in 2002.

In September 2009, following her visit to the DRC, US Secretary of State Hillary Clinton oversaw the adoption of the U.N Security Council Resolution 1888, which details specific efforts that must be taken to protect women from sexual violence in war-stricken regions, and measures taken to bring perpetrators to justice. Clinton has also urged the Congolese government to personally investigate members of FARDC who have committed crimes of sexual violence, and FARDC generals have declared that they will set up new military tribunals to prosecute soldiers accused of sexual violence. Additionally, she has supported a $17 million plan to combat the sexual violence in the DRC.

USAID/Kinshasa currently provides medical, psycho-social, judicial, and socio-economic support to approximately 8,000 survivors in North Kivu, South Kivu, and Maniema Province. The International Security and Stabilization Support Strategy found that 72 percent of international funds for sexual violence in the DRC are devoted to treating victims of rape and 27 percent to preventing sexual abuse.

DRC vs Burundi, Rwanda, and Uganda in March 1999 was the first case the African Commission on Human and Peoples' Rights heard that discussed violations of human rights, including sexual violence, during an armed conflict. The Commission found that the human rights abuses committed in the eastern provinces of the DRC were not in agreement to Part III of the Geneva Convention Relative to the Protection of Civilian Persons in Time of War of 1949, Article 75(2) of Protocol 1, and Articles 2 and 4 of the African Charter.

The International Criminal Court is conducting an ongoing investigation into crimes committed in the DRC during the Second Congo War and afterwards. Several military leaders have been charged with crimes of sexual violence. Germain Katanga, the leader of the Front for Patriotic Resistance in Ituri (FPRI), and Mathieu Ngudjolo Chui, the leader of the Nationalist and Integrationist Front (FNI), were charged and indicted with nine crimes against humanity including sexual slavery, a crime against humanity under article 7(1)(g) of the Rome Statute and a war crime under article 8(2)(b)(xxii) or (e)(vi) of the Rome Statute. Bosco Ntaganda of the Patriotic Forces for the Liberation of the Congo (FPLC) was charged with rape and sexual slavery. Callixte Mbarushimana of the Democratic Forces for the Liberation of Rwanda (FDLR), and Sylvestre Mudacumura have also been charged with rape.

According to Tier Rating, the Government of the Democratic Republic of the Congo does not comply with minimum standards for efforts to eliminate this problem by prosecuting perpetrators and providing services to victims. The government has not shown evidence in prosecuting sex trafficking perpetrators.

In June 2014, UK-based rehabilitation charity Freedom from Torture published its report "Rape as Torture in the DRC: Sexual Violence Beyond the Conflict Zone, using evidence from 34 forensic medical reports, to show that rape and sexual violence is being used routinely by state officials in Congolese prisons as punishment for politically active women. One of the women mentioned in the report stated: "Now I know, because I have been there, that it is normal for women to be sexually abused in prison..." The women included in the report were abused in several locations across the country including the capital Kinshasa and other areas away from the conflict zones.

In addition, Eve Ensler's nongovernmental organization, V-Day, has not only been crucial in the growing awareness regarding sexual violence in the DRC, but has also entered into a project with UNICEF and the Panzi Foundation to build The City of Joy, a special facility in Bukavu for survivors of sexual violence in the DRC. The center, which can host up to 180 women a year, has resources such as sexual education courses, self-defense classes, and group therapy, as well as academic classes and courses in the arts. The City of Joy facility opened in February 2011.

== Other perspectives ==
There are others who offer different perspectives to the dominant discourse about sexual violence in the Democratic Republic of the Congo.

Many Congolese populations on the ground, Congolese intellectuals, and field-based interveners emphasize that there are many other consequences of the armed conflict that deserve as much attention as sexual violence does, including killings, forced labor, child soldiers, and torture. They also believe that the attention to rape in the DRC contributes to the proliferation of the widespread stereotype of Congolese people as savage and barbaric.

It is also said that the international focus on this problem has led to unintended, negative consequences, including ignoring other forms of violence and rape of men and boys. The worst consequence discussed is the belief that some armed groups think that sexual violence is now an effective bargaining tool. Thus, according to this perspective, the international focus is actually contributing to the increase of sexual violence. It has been said that the mass rapes in Luvungi in 2010, where Mai-Mai Sheka gang raped 387 civilians, was partly due to this consequence because Sheka allegedly ordered his soldiers to rape women to draw attention to their group.

=== Perpetrator testimonies ===
The voices and testimonies of perpetrators have long been absent. However, during 2005–2006, Maria Erickson of the School of Global Studies at the Gothenburg University in Sweden interviewed soldiers and officers within the integrated armed forces. The interviews were organized in groups made up of 3–4 people and lasted between 3–4 hours.

A large portion of those interviewed were from the previous government forces, the FARDC. The data collected from the interviews provided detailed accounts and useful information on how the soldiers understood their identities, their roles as combatants and the amount of pain they inflicted onto their victims.

==== View of masculinity ====
Some of the FARDC soldiers interviewed described the military as a place for the tough and strong and as a place to prove one's manhood. One soldier stated that: "You have to learn the tough spirit of a soldier. If you do not know that, some beating up is required. Those who are not able to make it, we call them inept, also sometimes the women, the inept will run away''.

He also went on to demonstrate the desensitization that accompanies military macho-violence: ''....A soldier is a soldier. He is not a civilian. Bullets are bullets. It is a war. We are not going there to kill ducks. It is war. You go there to defend. The centre is no place for compassion".

==== Roles as soldiers ====
The respondents' perception of their roles as soldiers was reflected in their notions of what a successful position was within the armed forces. A successful soldier, they said, was an educated one who "sat behind a desk and completed administrative work". However, the soldiers also explained, that although administrative tasks were appealing, their entry into the force was not an active choice, but instead, was done to make money and receive an education.

Because manhood was closely linked to material wealth their choice to join the armed forces was not a vengeful call for violence or revenge but a fall back option because of unfortunate circumstances. Many of the soldiers described that they had not received the education they were promised and instead indicate that their lives had been filled with "ruin" and "tragedy". This discrepancy between a sense of how soldiering "should be" and "the way it was" was the basis for the prevalence of violence among armed forces.

== See also ==
- The Greatest Silence: Rape in the Congo – documentary film
- Ruined (play) – by Lynn Nottage, winner of 2009 Pulitzer Prize for Drama
- Sexual slavery
- Wartime sexual violence

General:

- Women in the Democratic Republic of the Congo
- Crime in the Democratic Republic of the Congo

International:

- Sexual violence in Finland
- Sexual violence in South Africa
- Sexual violence in Papua New Guinea
- Rape statistics (worldwide)
- Estimates of sexual violence (worldwide)
