= Revolutionary Movement of the Congo =

The Revolutionary Movement of the Congo (French: Mouvement révolutionnaire du Congo, or MRC) (Note: The group has sometimes been referred to as the Mouvement révolutionnaire congolaise (Congolese Revolutionary Movement).) was a coalition of rebel groups involved in the Ituri Conflict in the Democratic Republic of the Congo which was active between approximately 2006 and 2007.

The MRC emerged in Ituri District, Democratic Republic of the Congo in September 2006. Rather than a rebel group in its own right, it was chiefly a coalition of different independent rebel groups including the Patriotic Resistance Front of Ituri (FRPI), Party for Unity and Safeguarding of the Integrity of Congo (PUSIC), Union of Congolese Patriots (UPC), Nationalist and Integrationist Front (FNI), Armed Forces of the Congolese People (FAPC), and the Rally for Congolese Democracy-KML (RCD-KML). It was led by Bwambale Kabolele and Bosco Ntaganda and received foreign support, probably from Uganda and Rwanda which were competing for influence in the eastern Congo at the time.

The MRC, along with the FNI and FRPI, agreed to a disarmament deal on 22 August 2007.

== See also ==
- Popular Front for Justice in Congo (FPJC) - another Ituri rebel coalition, between 2008 and 2010.

== Citations ==
=== Bibliography ===
- Arnold, Guy (2008). "Congo, Democratic Republic". The A to Z of Civil Wars in Africa. Plymouth: Scarecrow Press. ISBN 978-0-8108-7048-2.
