= Cobra Matata =

Cobra Matata (Note: "Cobra Matata" is a regularly used alias. As indicated by these alternative names, sources conflict as to Matata's real name.)
- Other names: Banaloki Matata; Justin Banaloki; Justin Wanaloki; Justin Matata Wanaloki; Matata Wanaloki
- Known for: Leader of the FRPI and FPJC

Cobra Matata (also known as Banaloki Matata, Justin Banaloki, Justin Wanaloki, Justin Matata Wanaloki, and Matata Wanaloki) is a former leader of the Front for Patriotic Resistance in Ituri (FRPI) and Popular Front for Justice in Congo (FPJC) militias active in the Ituri conflict in the northeastern Democratic Republic of the Congo. He was previously a member of the D.R. Congo armed forces (FARDC), having integrated in 2007 before deserting to reconstitute a rebel group in 2010. In November 2006, Matata had agreed to disarm in exchange for amnesty. In the FARDC, Matata attained the rank of colonel or general. The International Criminal Court classified Matata as Ngiti.

Matata has been accused of leading the massacre at Nyakunde Hospital in 2002, which resulted in the deaths of at least 1,200 civilians, and the subsequent Bogoro massacre. Matata succeeded Germain Katanga as leader of the FRPI after Katanga integrated into the FARDC in 2004. Matata surrendered to the Congolese government on November 21, 2014, and was arrested on January 2, 2015, in Bunia, a city in Ituri, for crimes against humanity, war crimes, and the use of child soldiers. Matata was also accused of forming a rebel group, desertion, and attempting to escape detention. Prior to his surrender, Matata commanded an estimated 1,000 combatants in Ituri. The FARDC falsely claimed in 2011 that it had killed Matata.
