= Popular Front for Justice in the Congo =

Armed group operating in the DRC

- Leaders: Jean-Claude Baraka (POW); Sharif Manda (POW); Cobra Matata (surrendered) (POW); David Mbadu
- Dates active: 2008–?
- Active regions: Ituri Province, D.R. Congo
- Size: <100 (2011)
- Wars: Ituri conflict

The Popular Front for Justice in the Congo (French: Front populaire pour la justice au Congo, or FPJC) is an armed group operating in the south of Ituri Province in the Democratic Republic of the Congo (DRC), where it has participated in the Ituri conflict. It formed in September 2008 from a splintering of the Front for Patriotic Resistance in Ituri (FRPI) and coalescing of other armed actors, including combatants from the Nationalist and Integrationist Front, who had resisted national disarmament campaigns. The group has expressed opposition to a 2006 attempt to resolve the Ituri conflict, which granted amnesty to former participants in the conflict. In 2011, the group was estimated to have no more than 100 members. Whereas the FRPI was closely linked to the Ngiti ethnolinguistic group, the FPJC incorporated members of more varied ethnic backgrounds.

In October 2008, the FPJC clashed with Congolese government forces near Bunia in Ituri District, displacing thousands of local residents before it was pushed back by government troops and MONUSCO, the United Nations peacekeeping mission in the DRC. In March 2009, the FPJC launched attacks on villages southeast of Bunia, which were followed by counterattacks from the FRPI. The UN Refugee Agency blamed fighting between the rebel groups for the displacement of more than 30,000 Congolese in Ituri. Government forces launched an operation in 2010 to repel the FPJC and other rebel groups operating in Ituri and to relocate at-risk populations. An early leader of the FPJC, Sharif Mandu, was arrested on September 2, 2010, in Arua, a town in western Uganda. Another FPJC leader, Jean-Claude Baraka, was arrested around the same time. The arrest of Mandu was followed by a power struggle between his lieutenants. David Mbadu took control after his rival Cobra Matata, a former FPRI commander and briefly the FPJC leader, disappeared for a time. Matata surrendered to military forces in November 2014 and was arrested in January 2015.

In 2011, FPJC combatants stole national election materials from voter registration centers in Ituri, though did not otherwise block voter registration. The UN reported that the group has engaged in abductions and forced recruitment of adults and children. A resolution of the European Parliament in 2010 accused the FPJC, along with other armed groups active in eastern Congo, of "causing, either directly or indirectly, thousands of deaths, unbearable suffering, poverty and internally displaced people (IDPs) every month." In 2011, custody of Sharif Manda was transferred to the International Criminal Court to have Manda testify as a witness in the case against Germain Katanga, the former FPRI leader accused of war crimes and crimes against humanity.
