= Rombault Mbuayama =

- Born: Rombault Mbuayama Nsiona
- Military career
- Allegiance: Democratic Republic of the Congo
- Branch: Land Forces; Navy
- Rank: Vice Admiral
- Commands: Navy; 6th Military Region
- Conflicts: Ituri conflict Katanga insurgency

Vice Admiral Rombault Mbuayama Nsiona is a Congolese military officer and, as of 2014, is the chief of naval staff in the armed forces of the Democratic Republic of the Congo (FARDC). In 2007 he was appointed as the FARDC chief of logistics, being a brigadier general at the time. However, before becoming the chief of naval staff, he had served as the commander of the 6th Military Region (Katanga Province), holding the rank of major general. Before 2007 he had also served as regional commander in Ituri and Bas-Congo.

Military offices
| Preceded by Emmanuel Kyabu Kaniki | Chief of Staff of the Navy of the Democratic Republic of the Congo; 2014–2020 | Succeeded by Jean-Marie Valentin Matalinguma |
