= Armed Forces of the Congolese People =

The Armed Forces of the Congolese People (French: Forces armées du Peuple congolais, or FAPC) was a rebel group based in the Ituri region of the Democratic Republic of the Congo, active between approximately 2003 and 2005. It was a belligerent in the Ituri conflict. At its height, the group had approximately 2,000 to 3,000 fighters.

The FAPC was formed in March 2003. The group was supported by the Ugandan government of Yoweri Museveni which was trying to support its own interests in Eastern Congo following its formal military withdrawal from the region in 2002. Originally, the Ugandan government had supported the Union of Congolese Patriots (Union des Patriotes Congolais, UPC) rebel group but relations broke after the UPC sought aid from the Rwandan regime. The FAPC was founded and led by Jérôme Kakwavu, a former member of a number of rebel groups including the UPC, with the backing of Ugandan general Salim Saleh. The militia was operational around Aru, Ariwara and Mahagi along the section of the Congolese-Ugandan border to the north of Lake Albert. The region is known to have rich gold and timber resources.

Unlike most rebel groups active in Eastern Congo, the FAPC did not raid or intimidate civilian populations and instead attempted to create a state-like administration to raise money. It did not aim to overthrow the Congolese government but instead to maintain control of the border region it occupied. The group prioritised trading and cross-border smuggling in conflict minerals, especially gold, into Uganda which was worth an estimated 1–2 million United States dollars each month in 2004.

Under pressure from the United Nations MONUC peacekeeping mission, the FAPC was forced to disband. The process began on 6 March 2005 and a number of its members, including Kakwavu, were integrated into the Congolese military. A few FAPC rebels fled into exile.
