= Mathieu Ngudjolo Chui =

Congolese colonel and former rebel

- Born: 8 October 1970 (age 55); Bunia, Ituri Province, Republic of the Congo
- Other names: Mathieu Cui Ngudjolo, Cui Ngudjolo
- Occupations: Militia leader, nurse
- Known for: Indicted and acquitted by the International Criminal Court on war crimes and crimes against humanity charges

Mathieu Ngudjolo Chui (born 8 October 1970) is a colonel in the Congolese army and a former senior commander of the National Integrationist Front (FNI) and the Patriotic Resistance Force in Ituri (FRPI).

On 6 February 2008, he was arrested by the Congolese authorities and surrendered to the International Criminal Court (ICC) to stand trial on six counts of war crimes and three counts of crimes against humanity. The charges include murder, sexual slavery and using children under the age of fifteen to participate actively in hostilities.

In December 2012, he was acquitted of war crimes at the Hague by a three-judge panel presided over by Bruno Cotte on the grounds that the prosecution had not proven beyond reasonable doubt that he was responsible for the crimes committed, a decision which led to criticism of the ICC. The verdict was appealed on 20 December 2012 and the acquittal was confirmed on 27 February 2015.

He is also known as Mathieu Cui Ngudjolo or Cui Ngudjolo.

== Personal life ==
Ngudjolo was born on 8 October 1970 in Bunia, Ituri Province, in the north-east of the Democratic Republic of the Congo (DRC). A "poor farmer's son", he is believed to be of Lendu ethnicity and speaks Lingala, French, Swahili and Kilendu. He is married to Semaka Lemi and has two children.

== Career ==
Ngudjolo began his career as a corporal in the Congolese army (then called the Forces Armées Zaïroises) under the dictator Mobutu Sese Seko. He deserted when the First Congo War broke out in 1996 and, during the years that followed, he trained as a nurse and worked for the Red Cross in Bunia.

The Second Congo War began in 1998, but Ngudjolo did not become involved until 2002, when the Union of Congolese Patriots took control of Bunia. Between August 2002 and August 2006, Ngudjolo held senior positions in a number of rebel groups involved in the conflict in Ituri, including the National Integrationist Front (FNI), the Patriotic Resistance Force in Ituri (FRPI) and the Congolese Revolutionary Movement (MRC). On 24 February 2003, he allegedly led an attack on the village of Bogoro in which rebels under his command went on an "indiscriminate killing spree", killing at least 200 civilians, imprisoning survivors in a room filled with corpses, and sexually enslaving women and girls. Ngudjolo allegedly ordered his fighters to "wipe out" the village.

On 23 October 2003, he was apprehended by the United Nations and surrendered to the Congolese authorities, who charged him in connection with the killing of another rebel. He was subsequently acquitted and released. On 1 November 2005, a United Nations Security Council committee imposed a travel ban and asset freeze on him for violating an arms embargo.

In August 2008, Ngudjolo signed a peace deal with the Congolese government on behalf of the MRC. In December 2008, he was appointed a colonel in the DRC army as part of the peace process.

== International Criminal Court proceedings ==
On 6 July 2007, a Pre-Trial Chamber of the International Criminal Court (ICC) found that there were reasonable grounds to believe that Ngudjolo bore individual criminal responsibility for war crimes and crimes against humanity committed during the Bogoro attack, and issued a sealed warrant for his arrest. He was charged with six counts of war crimes (willful killing; inhuman treatment or cruel treatment; using children under the age of fifteen years to participate actively in hostilities; sexual slavery; intentionally directing attacks against civilians; and pillaging) and three counts of crimes against humanity (murder, inhumane acts and sexual slavery).

On 6 February 2008, the Congolese authorities arrested him and surrendered him to the ICC. The following day, he was flown to the ICC's detention centre in The Hague. Ngudjolo was the third suspect surrendered to the ICC since its establishment in 2002. He was tried jointly with Germain Katanga, who is also charged with directing the Bogoro attack; the hearing to confirm the charges against the two men began on 27 June 2008. Ngudjolo's lawyer has argued that the case should have been inadmissible since Ngudjolo has already been tried for the crimes in question. The trial began on 24 November 2009, and concluded on 23 May 2012. On 21 November, the charges against Katanga were separated.

A controversial verdict of not guilty was announced on 17 December. According to Judge Bruno Cotte, prosecutors had "not proved beyond reasonable doubt [that] Ngudjolo was responsible" for war crimes, and evidence presented had been "too contradictory and too hazy." Cotte ordered Ngudjolo to be released, denying the prosecution's request that he remain in ICC custody, though it was not immediately clear where he would go, as he is still subject to a United Nations travel ban. Prosecutors said that they would appeal the decision. Anonymous legal experts interviewed by Thomson Reuters judged it unlikely that the ICC's verdict would be overruled, as appeals do not permit new evidence to be submitted.

According to Ngudjolo's lawyer, Jean-Pierre Kilenda Kakengi Basila, "[a]ny other verdict would have astonished us. Judges have shown that this is a court that applies the law." The ICC's verdict was met with dismay from various observatory groups; Human Rights Watch said that it "leaves the victims of Bogoro and other massacres by his forces without justice for their suffering." The Ituri human rights group Equitas said via a spokesperson that "[t]he people trusted the International Criminal Court more than our national courts. After this decision, for those who were victims of this, there is a feeling of disappointment. The victims feel forgotten, abandoned by international justice."

The prosecution appealed the verdict on 20 December 2012. The repeal was rejected, confirming the acquittal and closing the case, on 27 February 2015.
