= Bogoro massacre =

2003 massacre in the Democratic Republic of the Congo

- Part of the Second Congo War and the Ituri conflict
- Location: 1.4084°N 30.2800°E; Bogoro, DRC
- Date: 24 February 2003
- Deaths: 200+
- Perpetrators: FNI, FRPI

The Bogoro massacre, which occurred on February 24, 2003, was an attack on the village of Bogoro in the Democratic Republic of the Congo (DRC) by the Nationalist and Integrationist Front (FNI) and the Front for Patriotic Resistance of Ituri (FRPI). The attackers allegedly went on an "indiscriminate killing spree", killing at least 200 civilians, imprisoning survivors in a room filled with corpses, and sexually enslaving women and girls. Two rebel leaders, Germain Katanga and Mathieu Ngudjolo Chui, have been charged by the International Criminal Court with war crimes and crimes against humanity over their alleged role in planning the attack.

== Background ==
Bogoro is a village in Ituri Province, in the north-east of the DRC. Between 1999 and 2003, Ituri was the scene of a violent conflict between the Lendu, Ngiti and Hema ethnic groups. The Hema-dominated Union of Congolese Patriots (UPC) seized control of Bunia, the district capital, in August 2002.

Bogoro was a strategically important town on the road between Bunia and the border with Uganda, with a UPC military camp in the middle of the town. The attack aimed to drive the UPC from Bogoro, but it also appeared to be a "reprisal operation against the Hema civilian population". It was part of a plan by Lendu and Ngiti rebels to attack predominantly Hema villages in preparation for an assault on Bunia.

== Attack ==
On 24 February 2003, hundreds of FNI and FRPI fighters — including children under the age of fifteen — attacked Bogoro with machetes, spears, arrows, mortars, rocket-propelled grenades, rocket launchers and firearms. According to the ICC, they circled the village and "converged towards the centre on a killing spree", killing at least 200 civilians, imprisoning survivors in a room filled with corpses, and sexually enslaving women and girls. Some residents of the village were killed by setting their houses on fire, others were hacked to death with machetes. The UN reported that 173 of the victims were under the age of 18.

UPC leader Thomas Lubanga claimed that 400 people were killed and 500 were missing after the attack. "The civilian population was very, very coldly massacred," he said.

The attack succeeded in pushing UPC forces out of Bogoro within a few hours and, ten days later, the Lendu and Ngiti drove the UPC from Bunia.

== International Criminal Court proceedings ==
In March 2004, the DRC government referred the situation in the country to the International Criminal Court (ICC). In July 2007, the Court found that there were reasonable grounds to believe that two rebel leaders, Germain Katanga and Mathieu Ngudjolo Chui, bore individual criminal responsibility for war crimes and crimes against humanity committed during the Bogoro attack, and issued sealed warrants for their arrest. Both men were charged with six counts of war crimes (willful killing; inhuman treatment or cruel treatment; using children under the age of fifteen years to participate actively in hostilities; sexual slavery; intentionally directing attacks against civilians; and pillaging) and three counts of crimes against humanity (murder, inhumane acts and sexual slavery). They are alleged to have ordered their fighters to "wipe out" the village of Bogoro.

Katanga, who had been held by the Congolese authorities since March 2005, was transferred to the ICC in October 2007. Ngudjolo was arrested by the Congolese authorities on 6 February 2008 and surrendered to the ICC. The two men will be tried jointly; the hearing to confirm the charges against them began on 27 June 2008.
