= Thomas Lubanga Dyilo =

Congolese war criminal (born 1960)

- Born: 29 December 1960 (age 65); Djiba, Orientale Province, Congo-Léopoldville
- Known for: War crimes; first person convicted by the International Criminal Court

Thomas Lubanga Dyilo (born 29 December 1960) is a convicted war criminal from the Democratic Republic of the Congo (DRC) and the first person convicted by the International Criminal Court (ICC). He founded and led the Union of Congolese Patriots (UPC) and was a key player in the Ituri conflict (1999–2007). Rebels under his command have been accused of massive human rights violations, including ethnic massacres, murder, torture, rape, mutilation, and forcibly conscripting child soldiers.

On 17 March 2006, Lubanga became the first person arrested under a warrant issued by the ICC. His trial, for the war crime of "conscripting and enlisting minors under the age of fifteen years and using them to participate actively in hostilities," began on 26 January 2009, and he was found guilty on 14 March 2012, and faced a sentence of up to 30 years. On 10 July 2012, Trial Chamber I of the International Criminal Court (ICC) sentenced Lubanga to a total period of 14 years of imprisonment, also ordering that the time from Lubanga's surrender to the ICC in 2006 until the sentencing day should be deducted from the 14-year term, which meant he would spend 6 fewer years in prison. He was released from prison in 2020. In early 2025 he established a new militia in the DRC.

== Early life and family ==
Lubanga was born on 29 December 1960 in Djiba in the Ituri Province of the Republic of the Congo (Léopoldville). He is of the Hema-Gegere ethnic group. He studied at the University of Kisangani and has a degree in psychology. He is married and has seven children.

== Ituri conflict ==
During the Second Congo War, Lubanga was a military commander and "minister of defence" in the pro-Uganda Congolese Rally for Democracy-Liberation Movement (RCD-ML). In July 2001, he founded another rebel group, the Union of Congolese Patriots (UPC). In early 2002, Lubanga was sidelined from the military control of the RCD-ML and he split from the group. In September 2002, he became President of the UPC and founded its military wing, the Patriotic Force for the Liberation of the Congo (FPLC).

Under Lubanga's leadership, the largely Hema UPC became one of the main actors in the Ituri conflict between the Hema and Lendu ethnic groups. It seized control of Bunia, capital of the gold-rich Ituri region, in 2002, and demanded that the Congolese government recognise Ituri as an autonomous province. Lubanga was arrested on 13 June 2002 while on a mission to Kinshasa but he was released ten weeks later in exchange for a kidnapped government minister.

Human Rights Watch has accused the UPC, under Lubanga's command, of "ethnic massacres, murder, torture, rape and mutilation, as well as the recruitment of child soldiers". Between November 2002 and June 2003, the UPC allegedly killed 800 civilians on the basis of their ethnicity in the gold mining region of Mongbwalu. Between 18 February and 3 March 2003, the UPC are reported to have destroyed 26 villages in one area, killing at least 350 people and forcing 60,000 to flee their homes. Human rights organisations claim that at one point Lubanga had 3,000 young soldiers between the ages of 8 and 15. He reportedly ordered every family in the area under his control to help the war effort by donating something: money, a cow, or a child to join his militia.

The UPC was forced out of Bunia by the Ugandan army in March 2003. Lubanga later moved to Kinshasa and registered the UPC as a political party, but was arrested on 19 March 2005 in connection with the killing of nine Bangladeshi United Nations peacekeepers in Ituri on 25 February 2005. He was initially detained in one of Kinshasa's most luxurious hotels but after a few months he was transferred to Kinshasa's central prison.

In January 2025, in its report on the Democratic Republic of Congo (DRC), the United Nations group of experts accused Thomas Lubanga of supporting armed groups, Zaire in Ituri and the March 23 (M23) movement.
In March 2025 Lubanga established a new armed militia in the Ituri Province in the DRC, the CRP (Convention pour la Révolution Populaire, Convention for the Popular Revolution), refusing to join the local Aru-II peace process there, instead undermining it. He aligned his militia with the M23 movement, which (by the end of 2025) controlled large parts of the eastern DRC. By mid-September 2025, clashes of the CRP with the Congolese Armed Forces had already caused dozens of civilian casualties. Lubanga created his militia "to respond to the scandalously blatant abdication of the state's sovereign duty to ensure the safety of people and their property".

== Trial ==
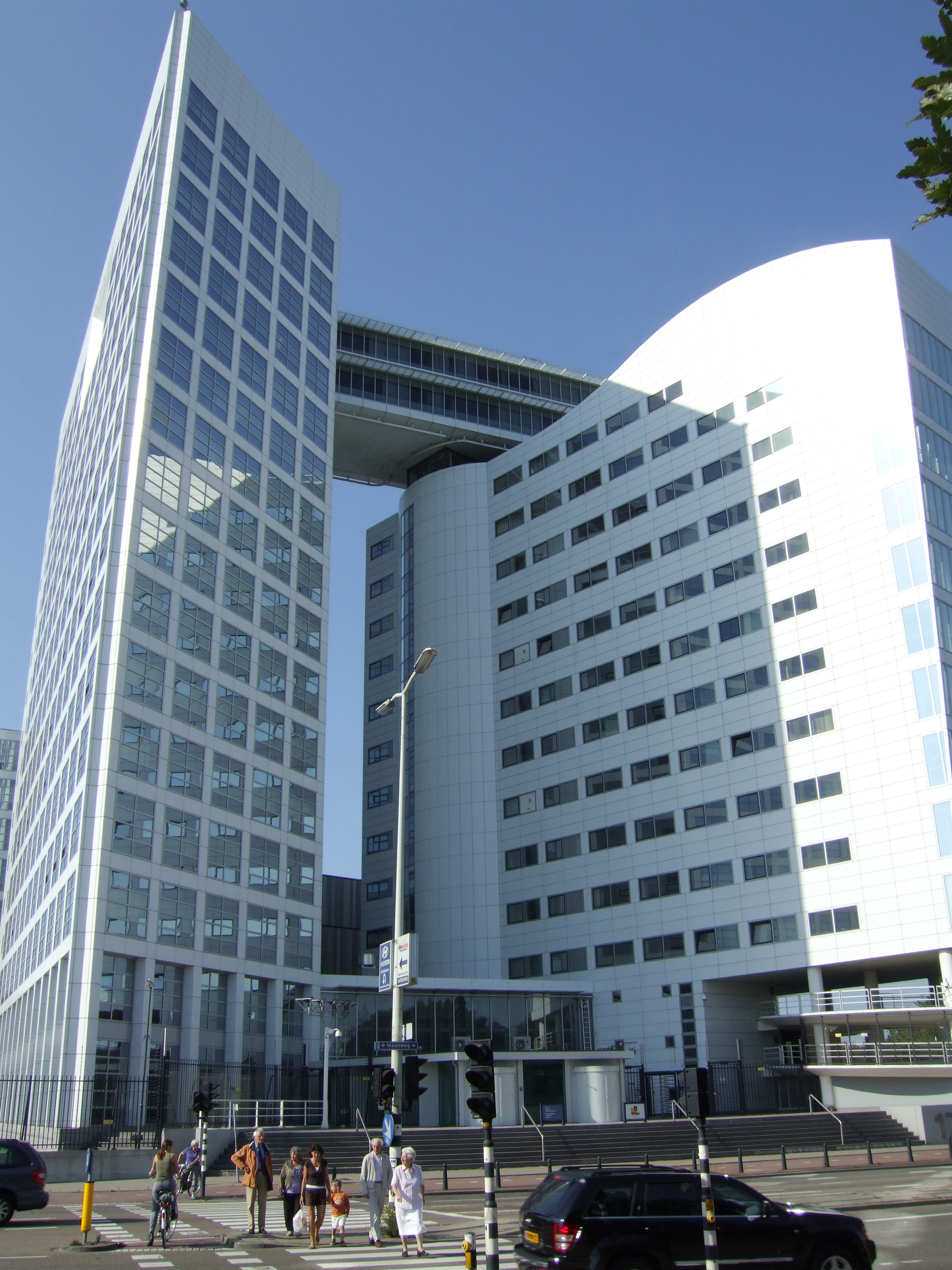
The former seat of the International Criminal Court in The Hague, where Lubanga stood trial.

In March 2004, the Congolese government authorised the International Criminal Court (ICC) to investigate and prosecute "crimes within the jurisdiction of the Court allegedly committed anywhere in the territory of the DRC since the entry into force of the Rome Statute, on 1 July 2002." On 10 February 2006, a Pre-Trial Chamber of the ICC found that there were reasonable grounds to believe that Lubanga bore individual criminal responsibility for the war crime of "conscripting and enlisting children under the age of fifteen years and using them to participate actively in hostilities", and issued a sealed warrant for his arrest.

On 17 March 2006, Lubanga became the first person arrested under an ICC arrest warrant, when the Congolese authorities arrested him and transferred him into ICC custody. He was flown to the Hague, where he was held in the ICC detention centre since 17 March 2006. Before embarking the plane, Lubanga wept openly. As of January 2009, he is one of four people being detained by the ICC, including two rebels who fought against Lubanga in the Ituri conflict: Germain Katanga and Mathieu Ngudjolo Chui. His trial opened on 26 January 2009.

On 14 March 2012 Lubanga was found guilty of abducting boys and girls under the age of 15 and forcing them to fight in a war in the Democratic Republic of Congo in 2002 and 2003. He faced a maximum sentence of 30 years when sentenced in July 2012.

== Sentence ==
On 10 July 2012, Lubanga was sentenced for 14 years by the ICC The sentencing was a landmark for the first permanent international criminal court, which recently celebrated its 10th anniversary. Presiding judge Adrian Fulford said the time Lubanga had spent in the court's detention centre in The Hague would be taken into account, meaning his sentence had only 8 more years to run.

During the first review in October 2015, Lubanga pleaded with ICC judges to grant him early release, promising to promote reconciliation and offering "sincere apologies for all victims for the suffering they endured". In September 2015, judges decided not to reduce Lubanga’s sentence after finding that there were no factors in favor of his early release. They found no evidence that he had genuinely dissociated from his crimes and also determined that Lubanga had not taken any significant action for the benefit of victims of his crimes. In the second review decision, judges ruled that there had been no changes in Lubanga’s cooperation with the court or in his actions to benefit victims. In December 2015, Lubanga was transferred to the DRC to serve the rest of his sentence from his home country’s Makala Central Prison.

In November 2017, ICC judges Silvia Fernández de Gurmendi, Howard Morrison, and Piotr Hofmańsk declined to reduce Lubanga’s sentence, after determining that since the initial review of the sentence two years earlier, there had been no significant change in circumstances to warrant his early release. The judges also stated that they saw no reason to schedule a further review of Lubanga’s sentence.

On 15 March 2020, Lubanga was released after serving the 14-year sentence.

=== Controversies ===
Lubanga's trial, the ICC's first, led to several controversies:

- The trial was halted on 13 June 2008 when the court ruled that the Prosecutor's refusal to disclose potentially exculpatory evidence had breached Lubanga's right to a fair trial. The Prosecutor had obtained the evidence from the United Nations and other sources on the condition of confidentiality, but the judges ruled that the Prosecutor had incorrectly applied the relevant provision of the Rome Statute and, as a consequence, "the trial process has been ruptured to such a degree that it is now impossible to piece together the constituent elements of a fair trial". On 2 July 2008, the court ordered Lubanga's release, on the grounds that "a fair trial of the accused is impossible, and the entire justification for his detention has been removed", but an Appeal Chamber agreed to keep him in custody while the Prosecutor appealed. By 18 November 2008, the Prosecutor had agreed to make all the confidential information available to the court, so the Trial Chamber reversed its decision and ordered that the trial could go ahead. The Prosecutor was widely criticised for his actions, but the court was also praised for its "determination to ensure fairness to the defence".
- Human rights groups have expressed their concern about the narrow scope of the charges against Lubanga, and urged the Prosecutor to add more crimes to the indictment. Several organisations wrote to the Prosecutor in 2006 arguing that "the failure to include additional charges in the case against Mr. Lubanga could undercut the credibility of the ICC in the DRC. Moreover, the narrow scope of the current charges may result in severely limiting victims' participation in the first proceedings before the ICC. This could negatively impact on the right of victims to reparations."
- Lubanga's lawyer complained that the defence team was given a smaller budget than the Prosecutor, that evidence and witness statements were slow to arrive, and that many documents were so heavily censored that they were impossible to read.
