= Ituri conflict =

Subconflict of the Second Congo War

- Part of the Congolese Civil Wars, the Second Congo War and the Kivu conflict
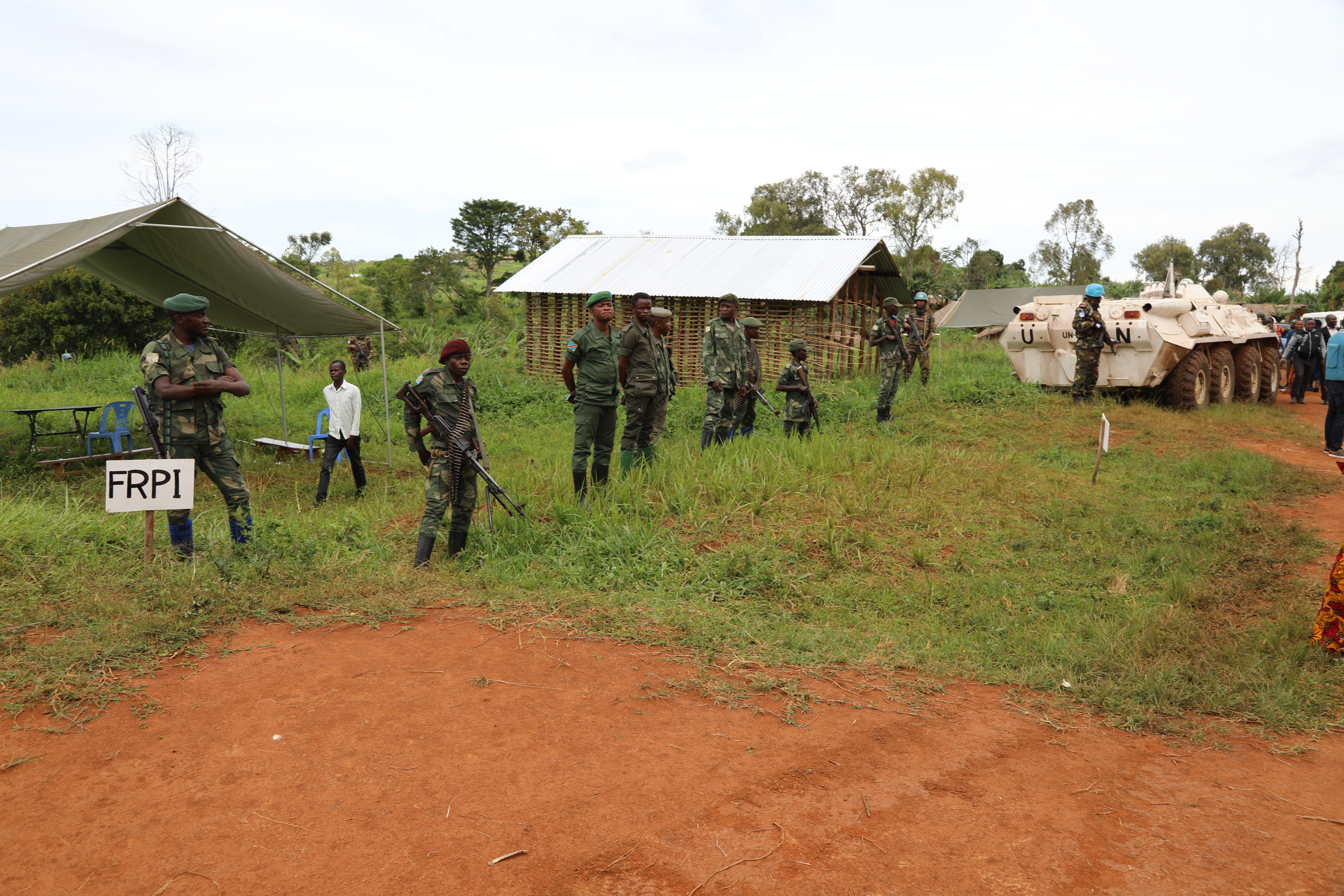
- FRPI Militia, waiting with MONUSCO peacekeepers, 2019
Date	Minor skirmishes 1972, 1985, 1996; Main conflict: 1999–2003 (4 years); Low level conflict: 2003–present (23 years)
Location	Ituri, Democratic Republic of the Congo
Status	Ongoing

Belligerents
Lendu ethnic group; FNI; FRPI; CODECO; FPJC; Mai-Mai Simba; Chini ya Kilima–FPIC; ADF; (Islamic State) IS-CAP; Mai-Mai Kyandenga	Hema ethnic group; UPC; Zaïre-FPAC; RCD/K-ML; FAPC; Uganda	DR Congo; FARDC; UN; MONUC; EU; Artemis

Commanders and leaders
Germain Katanga (FRPI) (POW); Mathieu Cui Ngudjolo (FRPI) (POW); Etienne Lona (FNI); Cobra Matata (FRPI/FPJC) (surrendered); Mbadu Abirodu (FRPI) (surrendered); Barnaba Kakado (FRPI) (POW)	Jérôme Kakwavu (FAPC) (surrendered); James Kazini	Joseph Kabila; Félix Tshisekedi; Rombault Mbuayama; Kabundi Innocent; Babacar Gaye (European Union) Jean-Paul Thonier

Strength
16,000 total (1999–2005); 2,000 total (2006); FRPI: 1,000 (2015)		(Democratic Republic of the Congo) 10,000–20,000 (2006) (United Nations) 4,000 (2003) (European Union) 1,400 (2003)

Casualties and losses
- ~63,770 killed (Note: 60,000 killed in 1998–2006, 527 killed in 2007–2017, 3,243 killed in 2017–2020); 140,000 civilians displaced (Note: Some 100,000 were internally displaced before 2021, 40,000 displaced in 2021.)

The Ituri conflict (French: Guerre d'Ituri) is an ongoing low intensity asymmetrical conflict between the agriculturalist Lendu and pastoralist Hema ethnic groups in the Ituri region of the north-eastern Democratic Republic of the Congo. While the two groups had fought since as early as 1972, the name "Ituri conflict" refers to the period of intense violence between 1999 and 2003. Armed conflict continues to the present day.

The conflict was largely set off by the Second Congo War, which had led to increased ethnic consciousness, a large supply of small arms, and the formation of various armed groups. More long-term factors include land disputes, natural resource extraction, and the existing ethnic tensions throughout the region. The Lendu ethnicity was largely represented by the Nationalist and Integrationist Front (FNI) while the Union of Congolese Patriots (UPC) claimed to be fighting for the Hema.

The conflict was extremely violent. Large-scale massacres were perpetrated by members of both ethnic factions. In 2006, the BBC reported that as many as 60,000 people had died in Ituri since 1998. Médecins Sans Frontières said "The ongoing conflict in Ituri, Democratic Republic of Congo (DRC), has led to more than 50,000 deaths, more than 500,000 displaced civilians and continuing, unacceptably high, mortality since 1999." Hundreds of thousands of people were forced from their homes, becoming refugees.

In June 2003, the European Union began Operation Artemis, sending a French-led peacekeeping force to Ituri. The EU force managed to take control of the regional capital of Bunia. Despite this, fighting and massacres continued in the countryside. In December 2003, the Hema-backed UPC split and fighting decreased significantly. As part of the disarmament and reintegration process, most of the 16,000 fighters in the region were disarmed by June 2005, but about 2,000 remained active. The new Congolese army and MONUC, the UN mission that replaced Artemis, fought the militias during 2005 and 2006, and there was an increase in ethnic violence. The situation calmed down in late 2006 and displaced people returned to their homes.

"Long-dormant" land disputes between "Hema herders and Lendu farmers" were re-ignited in December 2017 resulting in a surge of massacres with entire Hema villages razed and over a hundred casualties. Tens of thousands fled to Uganda. While the massacres by Lendu militia ceased in mid-March 2018, "crop destruction, kidnappings, and killings" continued. The UN estimated that as many as 120 Hema villages were attacked by Lendu militia from December 2017 through August 2018.

== Background ==
=== Lendu-Hema conflict ===
Ethnic tension between the Lendu and Hema can be traced to the colonial period, when the area was part of the Belgian Congo. The Belgian colonial administrators favored the pastoralist Hema, resulting in education and wealth disparities between the two groups. This divergence continued into modern times. Despite this, the two peoples have largely lived together peacefully and extensively intermarried. While the southern Hema speak their own language, the northern Hema speak Lendu.

The Hema and Lendu have longstanding grievances about land issues that had erupted into conflict on at least three previous occasions: 1972, 1985 and 1996. Much of the animosity revolves around the 1973 land use law, which allows people to buy land they do not inhabit and, if their ownership is not contested for two years, evict any residents from the land. Some wealthy Hema used this law to force Lendu off their land, leading to a growing sense of resentment. On January 19, 2001, armed Hema civilians reportedly massacred at least 200 Lendu in various quartiers (quarters) of Bunia. The victims, which included women and children, were killed with machetes, with some decapitated, and many bodies dumped into open pit latrines.

=== Ugandan involvement ===
The 1994 Rwandan genocide sent psychological shockwaves throughout the Great Lakes region. The murder of 800,000 people on the basis of ethnicity served to make people even more aware of their ethnic and linguistic affiliations. The subsequent influx of Hutu refugees into the region, which led to the First Congo War, served as further emphasis. During the Second Congo War, which began in 1998, the situation between the Hema and Lendu reached the level of regional conflict.

Much of the northern DRC, including Orientale Province (of which Ituri is a part), was occupied by the invading Uganda People's Defense Force (UPDF) and the Ugandan-backed Kisangani faction of the rebel Rally for Congolese Democracy (RCD-K) under the leadership of Ernest Wamba dia Wamba. The widespread conflict was accompanied by an influx of assault rifles and other firearms.

Ugandan forces were accused of stealing nine million dollars in gold from the province in 2003.

== Ituri conflict of 1999-2003 ==
=== UPDF splits off Ituri province (June 1999) ===
In June 1999 James Kazini, the commander of UPDF forces in the DRC, over the protests of the RCD-K leadership created a new province, Ituri, out of eastern Orientale Province. He then named a Hema as governor. This apparently convinced the Lendu that Uganda and the RCD-K were backing the Hema against them, and violence erupted between the two groups, resulting in the Blukwa massacre in which more than 400 ethnic Hemas were massacred by Lendu militias. The UPDF did little to stop the fighting but did, in some cases, aid the Hema. Even as the fighting intensified the UPDF continued to train both Hema and Lendu. Reports indicate that Lendu trainees refused to join the RCD-K and instead set up ethnically-based militias.

=== Temporary cessation of hostilities (1999–2001) ===
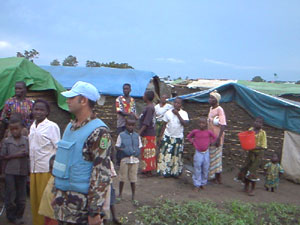
Internally displaced refugees in Bunia with MONUC personnel, 2004

The fighting did not begin to slow until the RCD-K named a neutral replacement to head the provincial government in late 1999. In the months prior approximately 200,000 people were displaced from their homes and 7,000 were killed in the fighting. An unknown number died of conflict-related disease and malnutrition, but mortality rates as high as fifteen percent were recorded during two measles outbreaks in the affected regions.

=== Renewed fighting (2001–2003) ===
The fighting flared again in 2001 after the UPDF replaced the neutral governor with a Hema appointee. The RCD-K appointed governor was taken to Kampala and held by the Ugandan government without explanation. In this period, an internal power struggle in the RCD-K resulted in a splitting of the organization into the RCD-K of Ernest Wamba dia Wamba and the RCD-Mouvement de Libération (RCD-ML) of Mbusa Nyamwisi, which had prominent Hema among its leadership.

Wamba dia Wamba returned to Bunia to denounce a proposed merger of the three major Ugandan-backed rebel groups, the RCD-K, the RCD-ML and Movement for the Liberation of Congo, as a Ugandan imposition. The quick collapse of Wamba dia Wamba's military base without Ugandan support is most probably a direct result of a perceived pro-Lendu stance.

== Peacekeeping operations (2003–2006) ==
In the beginning of 2003 UN observer teams present in DRC since 1999 monitored serious combat and human rights violations in Ituri. In April 2003, 800 Uruguayan soldiers were deployed in Bunia. In the same month an observer died in a mine explosion. In May 2003 two military observers were killed by militiamen. The withdrawal of 7,000 Ugandan troops in April 2003 led to a deteriorating security situation in the Ituri region, endangering the peace process.

UN Secretary-General Kofi Annan called for establishing and deploying a temporary multi-national force to the area until the weakened UN mission could be reinforced. On May 30, 2003, the Security Council adopted Resolution 1484 authorizing the deployment of an Interim Multinational Emergency Force (IMEF) to Bunia tasked with securing the airport, and protecting internally displaced persons in camps and civilians in the town.

The French government had already shown interest in leading the IMEF operation. It soon broadened to an EU-led mission with France as the framework nation providing the bulk of the personnel, complemented by contributions from both EU and non-EU nations. The total force consisted of about 1800 personnel and was supported by French aircraft based at N'Djamena and Entebbe airfields. A small 80-man Swedish Special Forces group, (SSG), was also added. The operation, Operation Artemis, launched on June 12 and the IMEF completed its deployment over the following three weeks. The force was successful in stabilizing the situation in Bunia and enforcing the UN presence in the DRC. In September 2003 responsibility for the security of the region was handed over to the UN mission.

In the summer of 2004, the first integrated brigade of the new Congolese army completed its training under Belgian instructors and was deployed to Ituri for peacekeeping. The brigade's first battalion, of 850 soldiers, was the first to arrive. The other two battalions arrived in late April 2005. On April 20, 2005, the 1st Integrated Brigade and MONUC troops conducted in a joint operation against militia strongholds, killing up to 20 fighters. As of June 2005 there were two integrated brigades, the 1st and 2nd, stationed in Bunia, Ituri.

In early 2006, there were reported to be six army brigades in the region, with each having between 1,500 and 3,200 soldiers. In 2005 and 2006, Congolese and MONUC forces launched "cordon and search" operations in Djugu and Urumu while giving militias an ultimatums to surrender. The Lendu FNI and the Hema UPC militias cooperated with each other to attack army and MONUC troops, and the fighting led to the displacement of 100,000 civilians. In mid-2006, General Rombault Mbuayama was appointed as commander of Congolese forces in Ituri.

The Lendu FNI and Union of Congolese Patriots (UPC) militias murdered nine Bangladeshi peacekeepers near the town of Kafe on February 25, 2005, the largest single UN loss since the Rwandan genocide. In response, UN forces assaulted a FNI stronghold, killing 50 militiamen. Thomas Lubanga Dyilo, the leader of the Union of Congolese Patriots, and other militia leaders were arrested by Congolese authorities and imprisoned in Makala Central Prison, Kinshasa.

Lubanga was accused of having ordered the killing of the peacekeepers in February 2005 and of being behind continuous insecurity in the area. In February 2006, the International Criminal Court issued an arrest warrant for Lubanga for the war crime of "conscripting and enlisting children under the age of fifteen years and using them to participate actively in hostilities". Congolese authorities transferred Lubanga to ICC custody in March 2006. Lubanga was found guilty in 2012 and sentenced to 14 years imprisonment, becoming the first person convicted by the ICC.

On April 1, 2005, the UN reported that less than half of the 15,000 militia members had disarmed by the deadline set. Peacekeeper Colonel Hussein Mahmoud stated that the MONUC would now aggressively and forcibly disarm the remaining militias. In April 2006 one Nepalese peacekeeper was killed and seven were taken hostage by the FNI. MONUC confirmed that seven of its peacekeepers were captured in an area 100 km east of Bunia, in the disputed northeastern region of Ituri. In May 2006 the FNI released the seven Nepalese peacekeepers. On October 9, 2006, MONUC reported that 12 FNI militiamen were killed in clashes with the Congolese army. MONUC spokesman Leocadio Salmeron stated that “no population movements have been observed” as a result of the fighting.

In the second half of 2006, the security situation improved, as the militia leaders were either arrested or integrated into the army, and displaced people were able to return to their homes. Lendu leaders accused the military (FARDC) of siding with the Hema, while the FARDC accused Lendu villagers of not ending their assistance to the FNI.

== Aftermath (2006–2008) ==
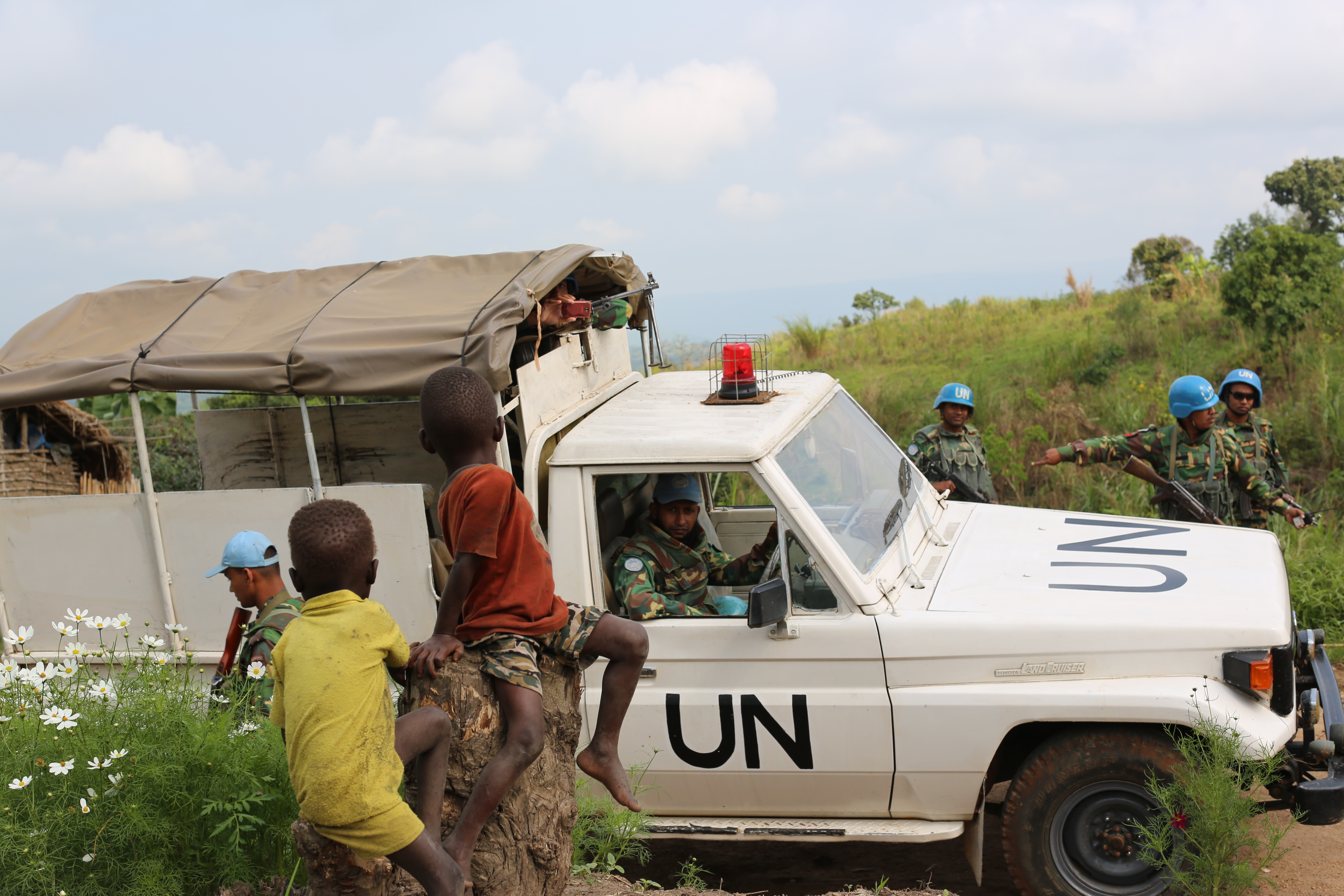
UN forces in Ituri in 2013

=== Foreign collusion ===
Human Rights Watch (HRW) has documented that AngloGold Ashanti, a subsidiary of mining conglomerate Anglo American, among others, supported the Nationalist and Integrationist Front (FNI). Payments were made to facilitate mining operations near the town of Mongbwalu, and gold was smuggled through Uganda to Europe and beyond. The proceeds from the gold trade were shared by the companies and armed militias. Following the release of the HRW report in June 2005, the Switzerland-based Metalor Technologies, the area's largest gold refiner, agreed to stop buying gold from Uganda.

On October 17, 2006, an Amnesty International, Oxfam, and International Action Network on Small Arms joint-research effort in Ituri found US, Russian, Chinese, South African, and Greek bullets. The researchers stated that: “this is just one example of how lax arms controls fuel conflict and suffering worldwide. UN arms embargoes are like dams against tidal waves.”

On October 11, 2006, as part of the agreement that led to the release of the Nepalese peacekeepers and following a ministerial decree signed on October 2, Congolese Defence Minister Adolphe Onusumba announced that FNI leader Peter Karim and Congolese Revolutionary Movement (MRC) leader Martin Ngudjolo were both appointed to the rank Colonel in the Congolese army, commanding 3,000 troops each.

=== Disarmament and reconciliation ===
The conflict has also seen the abduction and enslavement of civilians by armed troops. On October 16, 2006, Human Rights Watch stated that the DRC government needed to investigate and prosecute members of its army who had abducted civilians and their used them as forced labour, and called for an end to the practice. The whereabouts of nine civilians abducted on September 17 and 20 civilians abducted on August 11 remained unknown.

On October 30 a Congolese army officer, allegedly drunk, shot and killed two election officials in Fataki, Congo, which provoked a riot. He was sentenced to death the next day. On November 24, DRC's military prosecutor announced that three mass graves containing the bodies of about 30 people had been discovered in Bavi, Ituri. The commander of the battalion stationed in the town and a captain in charge of maintaining discipline were arrested.

In November 2006 the Ituri Patriotic Resistance Front (FRPI), the last of the three militias involved in the conflict, agreed to a deal by which up to 5000 fighters would release hundreds of child soldiers and disarm in exchange for an amnesty. Militia members would be incorporated into the national army and their leaders made officers in the wake of general elections endorsing the government of Joseph Kabila. The FNI became the last militia turn over its weapons in April 2007, although disarmament and demobilization continued through May. In November 2007, a Congolese government official announced that Ituri is mostly free of militias, except for some isolated elements of the FRPI.

Germain Katanga, the former leader of the FRPI, was surrendered on October 17, 2007, by the Congolese authorities to the International Criminal Court. On March 7, 2014, Katanga was convicted by the ICC on five counts of war crimes and crimes against humanity, as an accessory to the February 2003 massacre in the village of Bogoro, about 25 km southeast of Bunia, the provincial capital of Ituri. The verdict was the second-ever conviction for the International Criminal Court, following the conviction of Thomas Lubanga Dyilo.

== 2008–2017: "Front for Patriotic Resistance in Ituri" insurgency ==
The Second Congo War officially ended in 2003, but conflict continued in Ituri, with tens of thousands more killed. The continued conflict has been blamed both on the lack of any real authority in the region, which has become a patchwork of areas claimed by armed militias, and the competition among the various armed groups for control of natural resources in the area. The largest of these rebel groups is the Front for Patriotic Resistance in Ituri (FRPI), a Lendu-based group formed in 2002.

According to the 2014 publication, Modern Genocide, half of the militia members were under the age of 18 and some were as young as eight.

=== FRPI attacks (2008–2012) ===
Despite agreeing to a ceasefire in 2006, a splinter group of FRPI militants launched sporadic attacks on government forces and the civilian population beginning in 2008. These attacks included many atrocities, including rape, arson, and looting. In January 2010, Kakado Barnaba Yunga, the spiritual leader of the FRPI, was brought to trial in Bunia. Yunga was accused of launching a rebellion, looting, rape, and cannibalism, among other crimes. Over the next few years, tens of thousands of civilians were displaced by FRPI militants, who continued to attack them and commit numerous crimes.

=== FARDC counter-attacks and surrender offers (2012–2014) ===
As the attacks from the FRPI mounted, the FARDC (the Congolese military) began large-scale operations against them. Cattle and other stolen property were recovered and returned to the local population. Slowly, FRPI militants began disbanding, and many were incorporated into the FARDC.

In September 2014, MONUSCO opened an office in the village of Aveba with the goal of providing militants a place to surrender, with mixed success.

=== FRPI: (2014 – December 2017) ===
In spite of government efforts, the FRPI attacks civilians to this day, particularly since 2014. More property has been stolen and more crimes have been committed. Militants may be using bases in Uganda to aid in operations. Although FRPI commander Mbadu Adirodu promised to surrender 300 militants in May 2015, by June peace negotiations had broken down and fighting continued.

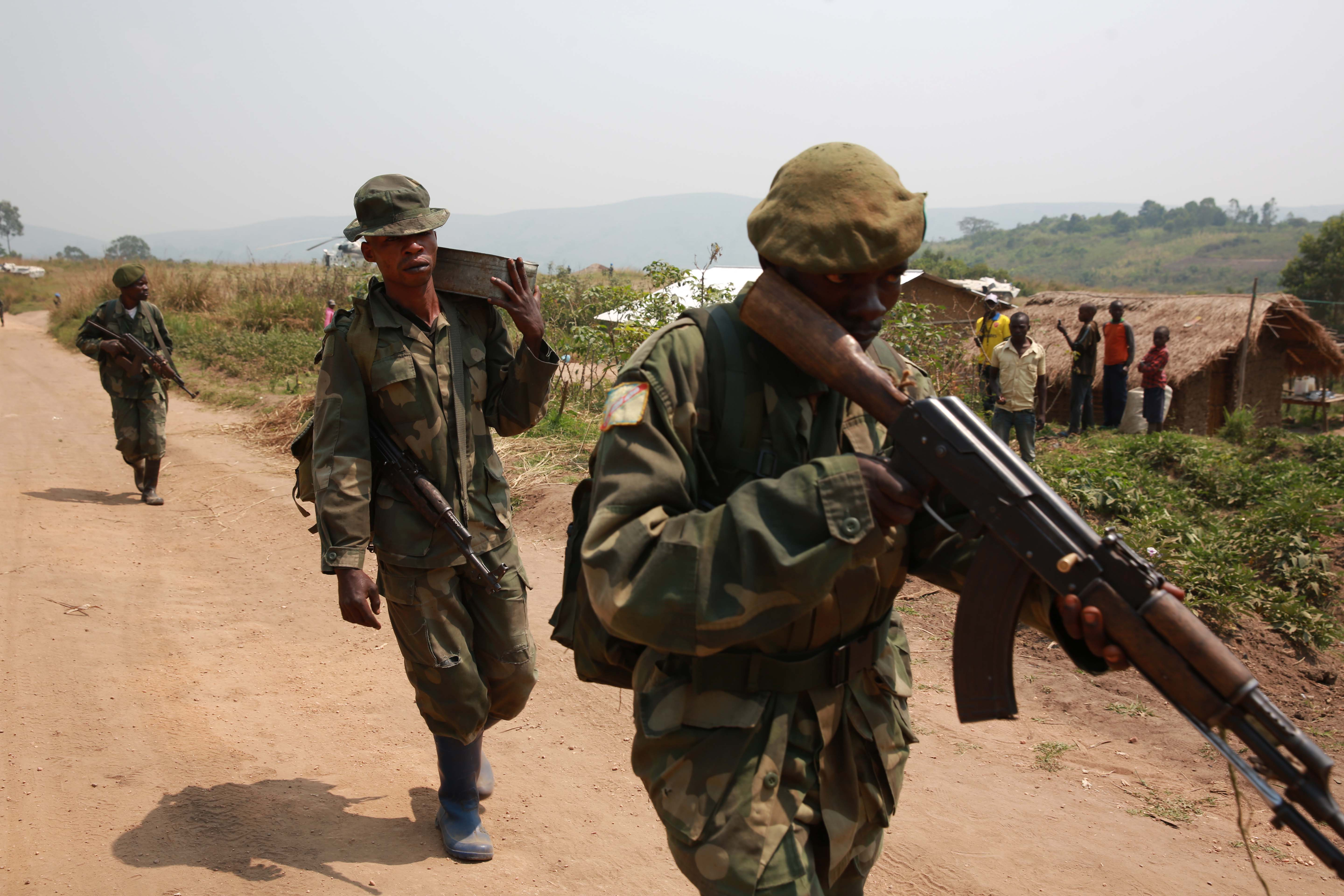
FARDC soldiers on patrol near Aveba in 2015

== 2017 resurgence (ongoing) ==
=== Resurgence of Hema-Lendu conflict ===
In 2017 tensions between the Hema and Lendu were reignited once more when on June 5, 2017, Father Florent Dhunji, a Lendu priest, died during his stay at presbytery of the Bahema abbots, Drodro. While the circumstances of his death were mostly unknown, some Lendu started accusing the Hema of planning to exterminate their leaders, with the priest representing the first victim.

According to an August 2018 Vice News report, for ten years prior to the 2017 outbreak of violence, the Lendu and Hema communities lived in "relative peace, sharing the same marketplaces and intermarrying". Rumors of violence began spreading in the summer of 2017, but the Hema community were shocked "when neighbors became murderers overnight". The report also noted that some the Lendu community members rejected claims that this was an ethnic conflict. Human Rights Watch's Central Africa director, Ida Sawyer said, "The violence started with incredible speed and seemed, for many in the region, to come out of nowhere."

For the time being this only led to hate speech between the two communities and low levels of violence. But that soon changed as just a few months later on December 17, after an altercation between a soldier and a Lendu youth at the military post of Uzi, Djugu territory. Hema youths pursued and beat up the young man. The next day, Lendu youth wounded three Hema women with a machete, and Hema youth attacked the village of Tete and set fire to multiple houses.

By December 18, 2017, the United Nations Organization Stabilization Mission in the Democratic Republic of the Congo (MONUSCO) announced that it would be closing its base in Bogoro, site of the February 2003 Bogoro massacre. Ituri residents in that region feared a recurrence of the 2003 violence with the withdrawal of MONUSCO troops.

On December 22, after a public meeting, then governor Pene Baka was able to set up peace between the two communities. Following this meeting, no major incident was reported for a little more than a month.

This peace was broken when on February 10, 2018, unidentified militiamen started attacking several Hema villages in Bahema-Nord and Bahema-Bajere, Djugu territory. The largest of these attacks was in the village of Rule, where 60 people lost their lives as their village was burnt to the ground. Their attacks didn't stop at just the Hema, they also started attack FARDC forces stationed in the area as well. They also stole many modern military equipment including weapons and ammunition. By mid-February 2018, entire Ituri villages had been burned to the ground and many others completely abandoned.

Starting in January Congolese began to cross Lake Albert to safety in Uganda. By the last two weeks of February 2018 more than 40,000 people had made the journey to Uganda via Lake Albert. By February 2018, according to the United Nations Children's Fund (UNICEF) report, there were an estimated 66,000 children internally displaced and another 25,000 refugees in Uganda. By mid-February 2018, 20,000 villagers had been displaced from Ituru villages to Bunia, according to the United Nations Office for the Coordination of Humanitarian Affairs (OCHA)'s Idrissa Conteh.

According to MSF, the Ugandan government confirmed an outbreak of cholera in the areas of the existing refugee camps. In the last two weeks of February MSF reported that there were more than 1,000 hospitalizations with cholera and 30 deaths from the disease.

On March 1 and 2, 2018, more than forty civilians were killed in a major Lendu attack on the village of Maze, about 80 kilometres north of Bunia. in Ituri province. According to a March 7, 2018, report, the violence between the Hema and Lendu ethnic groups in Ituri province continued to increase in several DRC provinces over the "control of disputed land." As part of a wave of violence, three Uturi villages were attacked and 39 Uturian were killed—10 people in Djo, ten in Gbi, and 19 in Logo Takpa near Tche. By mid-March the massacres had ceased but "crop destruction, kidnappings, and killings" continued.

=== Escalation ===
By March 2, 2018, after the second deadly attack in March over land disputes between have reignited a long-dormant ethnic conflict and caused thousands to flee, the United Nations warned that the DRC was at a "breaking point" with ten million Congolese needing humanitarian aid and 4.5 million internally displaced. The BBC reported March 2 that the army said it had separated the fighters from one another. At least 33 and as many as 49 people had been killed, some of them beheaded.

By March 3, 2018, thousands of people were fleeing the violence that resulted in over one hundred casualties.

In the spring of 2018, 350,000 people from Ituri had fled the violence, with about 50,000 making Lake Albert crossing to Uganda.

On June 10, suspected Hema armed actors killed Lendu traders on a road leading to the Hema village of Bembu-Nizi. In retaliation, Lendu burned down nearby Hema villages and killed the people living in those villages. By the end of June 160 were killed and about 360,000 people were displaced.

In response to these attacks, the FARDC launched Operation Zaruba ya Ituri ("Ituri storm") in June. This new operation was aimed at getting rid of the militias in Ituri. At first the army was able to liberate several areas, including the Cooperative for the Development of the Congo (CODECO) stronghold of Wago forest on June 26. But the dispersed militiamen were able to gain the protection of people in ethnic Lendu communities, allowing them to spread their terror in even more civilian territories including internally displaced person (IDP) camps. They were also soon able to retake localities that they were just kicked out of.

On June 20, Yves Mandro Kahwa Panga, former militia leader in the 1999 war, returned from exile to support the government in promoting peace between the Lendu and Hema.

The militiamen also started attacking members of the Alur community. The first time this happened was On July 16 when suspected Lendu militiamen killed 8 Alur in Babulaba groupment, Irumu territory. By the end of 2019, about 700 people had been killed.

In January 2019, due to the increased violence in North Kivu, the army had to withdraw from its positions in Ituri and move troops down south. Lendu militiamen took advantage of this regain control of 22 villages in the chiefdoms of Bahema-Bajere and Bahema-Nord, Djugu territory. They also regained two Mokambo chiefdom groupments, Mahagi territory, and all of Walendu-Pitsi groupment, Djugu territory.

In early April 2019, the FARDC killed 38 militants and captured eight, along with several weapons, in the Mambasa Territory. In late April the FARDC lost four soldiers and killed six militants during an operation in the Djugu territory.

In June 2019, 240 people were killed in a wave of violence that lead to more than 300,000 people fleeing.

In January 2020 the FARDC launched an operation to clear out Ituri of militants, as part of a larger operation launched in October 2019 in North Kivu against the militias there.

On September 30, 2020, fighting broke out between FRPI and government of DRC despite a peace accord signed by FRPI in February 2020. Six FRPI militants, three government soldiers and two civilians were killed in the fighting, ten people were seriously wounded; six FRPI militants and four government soldiers.

In June 2023, more than 45 civilians were killed by CODECO in an IDP camp in Bahema Badjere district. In July 2023, at least 40 civilians died in attacks by armed groups in Ituri province.

=== CODECO insurgency ===
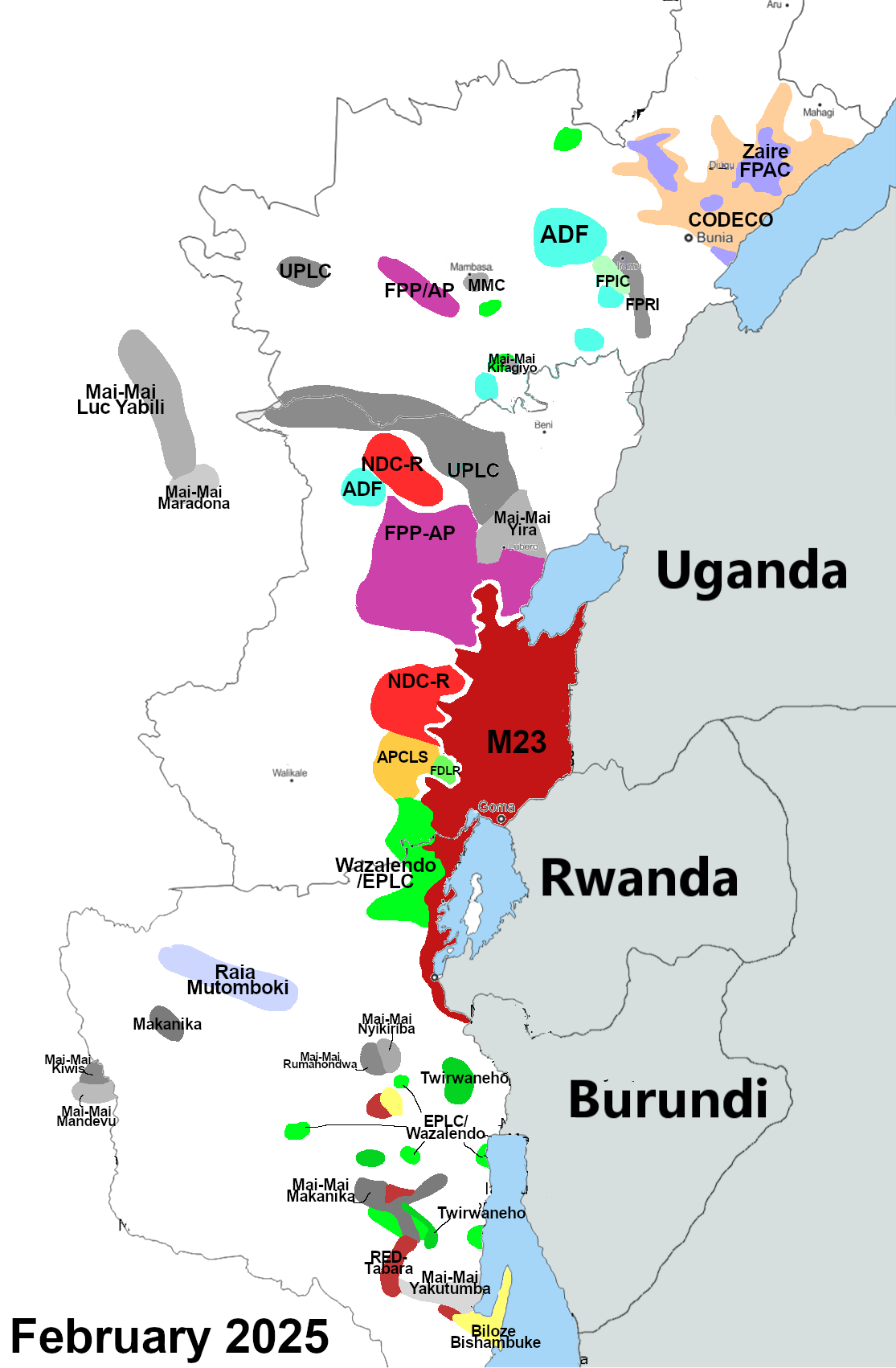
A map of armed groups in Ituri, 2020

At the start of the new violence, the identity of the Lendu militiamen was unknown. The group did not appear to be any of the former armed groups operating in the area and no armed group was claiming responsibility for the attacks. Later on, a group of an association of militias called the Cooperative for the Development of the Congo (CODECO) came forward. The organization did not appear to have an overarching command structure. Rather, it is composed of several small groups working independently under the same name.

Different militias scattered across Ituri claim to be under a separate organization, the Union of Revolutionaries for the Defence of the Congolese People (URPDC), and wish to be referred by that name. Civil and military authorities, as well as public opinion, see no difference between the groups, and consider URPDC to be an extension of CODECO.

CODECO was founded in the late 1970s by Bernard Kakado. Its initial aim was to promote agriculture in the chiefdom of Walendu-Bindi, Irumu territory. In the 1999-2003 war, Bernard Kakado organised a Lendu self-defence group before joining the FRPI, leaving CODECO as an agricultural cooperative to cease to exist.

It is unknown to what extent the Lendu community supports CODECO. CODECO demands center around two major issues: the reclaiming of land allegedly taken by the Hema and a refusal to accept foreign exploitation of local resources. Many Lendu leaders have condemned the violence created by Lendu militias. They claim the Lendu militias are a product of outside manipulation by corrupt Congolese politicians in Kinshasa and Uganda.

On June 12, 2019, the FARDC identified the leader of CODECO as Justin Ngudjolo. In the same month, Ngudjolo went on local radio and proclaimed himself as leader of the "armed group of Wago forest," leading a force of 2,350 trained men to protect the Lendu from the Hema.

On February 28, the FRPI and the government signed a peace agreement which triggered new attacks by CODECO because the FRPI obtained the conditions also demanded the CODECO.

In February 2020, at least 24 people were reported killed in an attack by members of CODECO. CODECO militias have been active in the Djugu territory north of Bunia, capital of Ituri since 2019.

In March 2020, CODECO suffered a series of setbacks, losing men and territory and having their leader be killed by the army. In retaliation for Ngudjolo's murder, the CODECO increased its attacks in April and regained control of lost localities in Djugu, Mahagi, and Irumu territories. After Ngudjolo's death, the CODECO command structure broke down. The control it still has over the Lendu militias is unknown. Now many factions including the URPDC are trying to gain control of CODECO's leadership.

On March 17, alleged leaders of the URPDC, Raymond Tseni Adrionzi and Joseph Amula (aka Kesta), were arrested.

In March, 309 CODECO militants were reportedly killed during the Storm of Ituri 2 operation launched by the FARDC in Djugu and Mahagi and in part of Irumu. The army lost 63 soldiers in the offensive. It recaptured two militia strongholds in Djaro and Londjango as well as several towns.

From June to September 2020, CODECO and Patriotic Force and Integrationist of Congo (FPIC) militias are reported to have killed more than 280 people and abducted over 90 others in Ituri.

On October 28, the FARDC seized two rebel strongholds in four days of intense fighting which killed 33 CODECO militiamen and 2 soldiers. MONUSCO forces also supported the army to repel an attack by CODECO/ALC on the province's capital Bunia on October 24.

On February 18, 2021, nine ALC/CODECO militiamen were killed as FARDC launched a series of operations against several armed groups in the outskirts of Bunia. Army spokesman said several localities where the FPIC (Patriotic and Integrationist Front of Congo) and elements of FRPI had strong influence, were under control of the FARDC.

From December 2022 to January 2023, CODECO attacks increased leading to the death of at least 195 civilians. Such attacks on civilians created a significant deterioration in the local security situation which had in turn, restricted humanitarian aid into the region and increased the number of displaced persons. On January 19, 2023, UN peacekeepers discovered the mass graves of over 49 civilians in the villages of Nyamamba and Mbogi, 30 kilometers east of Bunia. The victims were purported to have been massacred by CODECO rebels.

In July 2024, CODECO militiamen attacked the town of Pluto, controlled by the Zairian militia, in the Democratic Republic of Congo, causing the displacement of the population. The Zairian militia are a Hema armed group called the Ituri Self-Defense Popular Front, commonly known as Zaïre-FPAC. After four hours of fighting, the Armed Forces of the Democratic Republic of Congo (FARDC) intervened. Thirteen Zairian soldiers, seven CODECO soldiers and six FARDC soldiers were killed.

== See also ==
- Plaine Savo massacre
- Allied Democratic Forces insurgency
- Paul Sadala
