= Germain Katanga =

Congolese war criminal (born 1978)

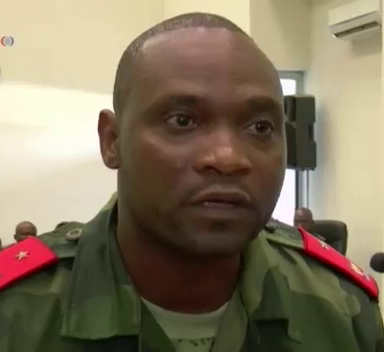
- Born: 28 April 1978 (age 48); Mambasa, Orientale Province, Zaire
- Other name: Simba
- Known for: Indicted by the International Criminal Court for war crimes and crimes against humanity

Germain Katanga (French pronunciation: [ʒɛʁmɛ̃ katɑ̃ɡa]; born 28 April 1978), also known by his nom de guerre Simba (pronounced [sɛ̃ba]), is a Congolese former rebel leader and the former head of the Patriotic Resistance Force in Ituri (FRPI), an armed group in the Ituri Province of the Democratic Republic of the Congo (DRC). On 17 October 2007, the Congolese authorities surrendered him to the International Criminal Court (ICC) to stand trial on six counts of war crimes and three counts of crimes against humanity. The charges include murder, sexual slavery, rape, destruction of property, pillaging, willful killing, and directing crimes against civilians.

On 7 March 2014, Katanga was convicted by the ICC on five counts of war crimes and crimes against humanity as an accessory to the February 2003 massacre in the village of Bogoro. The verdict was the second-ever conviction in the 12 years of operation of the ICC, following the 2012 conviction of Thomas Lubanga Dyilo. Katanga transferred from imprisonment in the Netherlands to imprisonment in Congo in December 2015 to complete his sentence. His ICC sentence was reduced, with the completion date set to 18 January 2016. Following the completion of his ICC sentence, he remained in prison under war crimes charges under the Congolese legal system.

== Early life and family ==
Katanga was born on 28 April 1978 in Mambasa, Orientale Province, in the north-east of Zaire (the modern-day DRC). He is believed to be of Ngiti ethnicity. He is married to Denise Katanga and has two children.

== Patriotic Resistance Force in Ituri ==
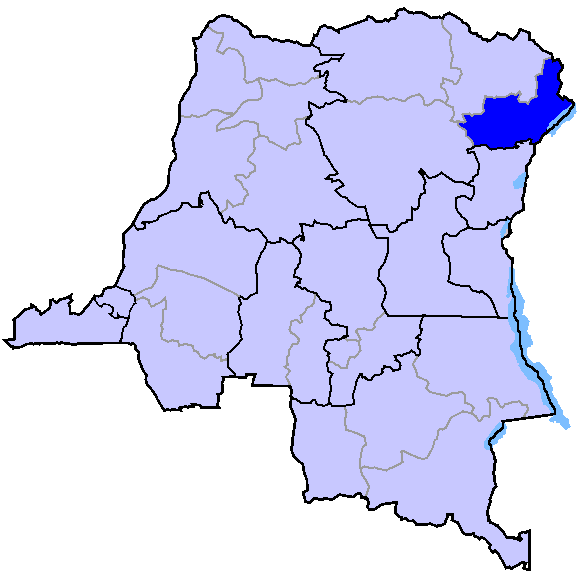
Location of Ituri within the Democratic Republic of the Congo

In early 2003, he emerged as the senior commander of the FRPI, a militia group which was involved in the conflict in Ituri. On 24 February 2003, Katanga allegedly led an attack on the village of Bogoro in which rebels under his command went on an "indiscriminate killing spree", killing at least 200 civilians, imprisoning survivors in a room filled with corpses, and sexually enslaving women and girls. It has also been alleged that Katanga helped lead other crimes, including the massacre of more than 1,200 civilians in an attack at Nyakunde Hospital in September 2002.

On December 11, 2004, Katanga was one of six former militia leaders appointed as generals in the Congolese armed forces (FARDC) as part of a peace process. He was granted the specific rank of brigadier general. Katanga was succeeded as leader of the FRPI by Cobra Matata.

He was arrested by the Congolese authorities in early March 2005 in connection with the killing of nine United Nations peacekeepers in Ituri on 25 February 2005. He was held without charge until his transfer to the ICC in October 2007. On 1 November 2005, a United Nations Security Council committee imposed a travel ban and asset freeze on Katanga for violating an arms embargo.

== International Criminal Court proceedings ==
On 2 July 2007, a Pre-Trial Chamber of the ICC found that there were reasonable grounds to believe that Katanga bore individual criminal responsibility for war crimes and crimes against humanity committed during the Bogoro attack, and issued a sealed warrant for his arrest. He was charged with six counts of war crimes (willful killing; inhuman treatment or cruel treatment; using children under the age of fifteen years to participate actively in hostilities; sexual slavery; intentionally directing attacks against civilians; and pillaging) and three counts of crimes against humanity (murder, inhumane acts and sexual slavery).

On 17 October 2007, the Congolese authorities surrendered him to the ICC and he was flown to the ICC's detention centre in The Hague. Katanga was the second person surrendered to the ICC since its establishment in 2002.

In February 2008, another suspect, Mathieu Ngudjolo Chui, was surrendered to the ICC to face charges in relation to the Bogoro attack; he and Katanga were to be tried jointly. The hearing to confirm the charges against them began on 27 June 2008. and ended on 11 July 2008. On 26 September 2008, Pre-Trial Chamber I confirmed some of the charges against Katanga and Ngudjolo and committed them for trial before a Trial Chamber of the Court.

The trial began on 24 November 2009.

=== ICC verdict ===
On March 7, 2014, by a 2-to-1 decision, the ICC convicted Germain Katanga on five counts of war crimes and crimes against humanity, as an accessory in the February 2003 massacre in the village of Bogoro in the DRC. The verdict was only the second time in the 12-year history of the International Criminal Court that an ICC trial resulted in a conviction.

The Bogoro massacre resulted in approximately 200 villagers being killed, and many women being raped and forced into sexual slavery. Katanga was originally charged as an "indirect co-perpetrator" for the crimes related to the Bogoro massacre but was only convicted of being an accessory to these crimes. This change in the charge was made by the Court during the trial. Judge Christine van den Wyngaert, in her dissenting opinion, said that it "has rendered this trial unfair by infringing a series of Germain Katanga's rights". The court acquitted Katanga of directing rapes and the use of child soldiers during the massacre, citing insufficient evidence to connect Katanga to these crimes, while at the same time emphasizing that these crimes did occur. The court cited evidence that Katanga supplied guns to the militia that carried out the Bogoro massacre, thus "reinforcing the strike capability of the militia" in justifying the convictions of Katanga as an accessory, but indicated that the evidence presented during the trial was insufficient to sustain the original charge that he directed the massacre.

Katanga's co-accused, Mathieu Ngudjolo Chui, was acquitted of similar charges in December 2012 because of the lack of evidence for his role in the massacre. Although Katanga and Chui were originally charged together, the ICC split their trials in November 2012 to allow the prosecutors to collect more evidence regarding Katanga's involvement.

The Katanga trial verdict produced mixed reactions. Some human rights activists in the DRC expressed satisfaction with the verdict as bringing a measure of closure to the victims and their families, with one activist quoted as saying: "For those who lost their possessions, their mothers, their homes, this judgment provides some relief. Today people here see some satisfaction. In the end, everyone must answer for his actions." A lawyer for the victims in the case stated: "In their heart, many victims want to believe that, somehow, this judgment will contribute to peace and reconciliation". Some women's groups criticized the ICC for acquitting Katanga of rape and sexual slavery charges, claiming that the court appeared to demand higher level of proof for the sexual crimes than for other crimes. Phil Clark, a London-based expert on the ICC, criticized the ICC prosecutors for not devoting sufficient resources to the case: "The ICC has been doing its investigations on the cheap. It's been using a really small group of investigators who haven’t spent an enormous amount of time in Congo. The prosecution has cut corners, they’ve used local Congolese intermediaries to do a lot of their dirty work. And as a result of that these cases haven’t been systematically built."

The UN Secretary General Ban Ki-moon issued a statement welcoming the verdict. Melbourne Law School Professor Kevin Jon Heller, an expert in international criminal law, has strongly criticised the recharacterisation of the charges Katanga faced, arguing that this violates the Rome Statute of the International Criminal Court and the rights of the accused.

On 23 May 2014, Katanga was sentenced to 12 years' imprisonment. The almost seven years he spent in detention at the ICC – between 2007 and 2014 – was deducted from the sentence. On 19 December 2015, Katanga was transferred to a prison in the DRC, where he is served the balance of his sentence. Katanga's sentence was reduced by the ICC, with a completion date of 18 January 2016. Katanga remained imprisoned while the Congolese government pursued further charges for war crimes and crimes against humanity that were still ongoing as of March 2017. Opinio Juris described the Congolese charges as raising concerns about non bis in idem (double jeopardy).

== See also ==
- People detained by the International Criminal Court
