= Patriotic Resistance Front of Ituri =

Political party in the Democratic Republic of the Congo

Front for Patriotic Resistance in Ituri
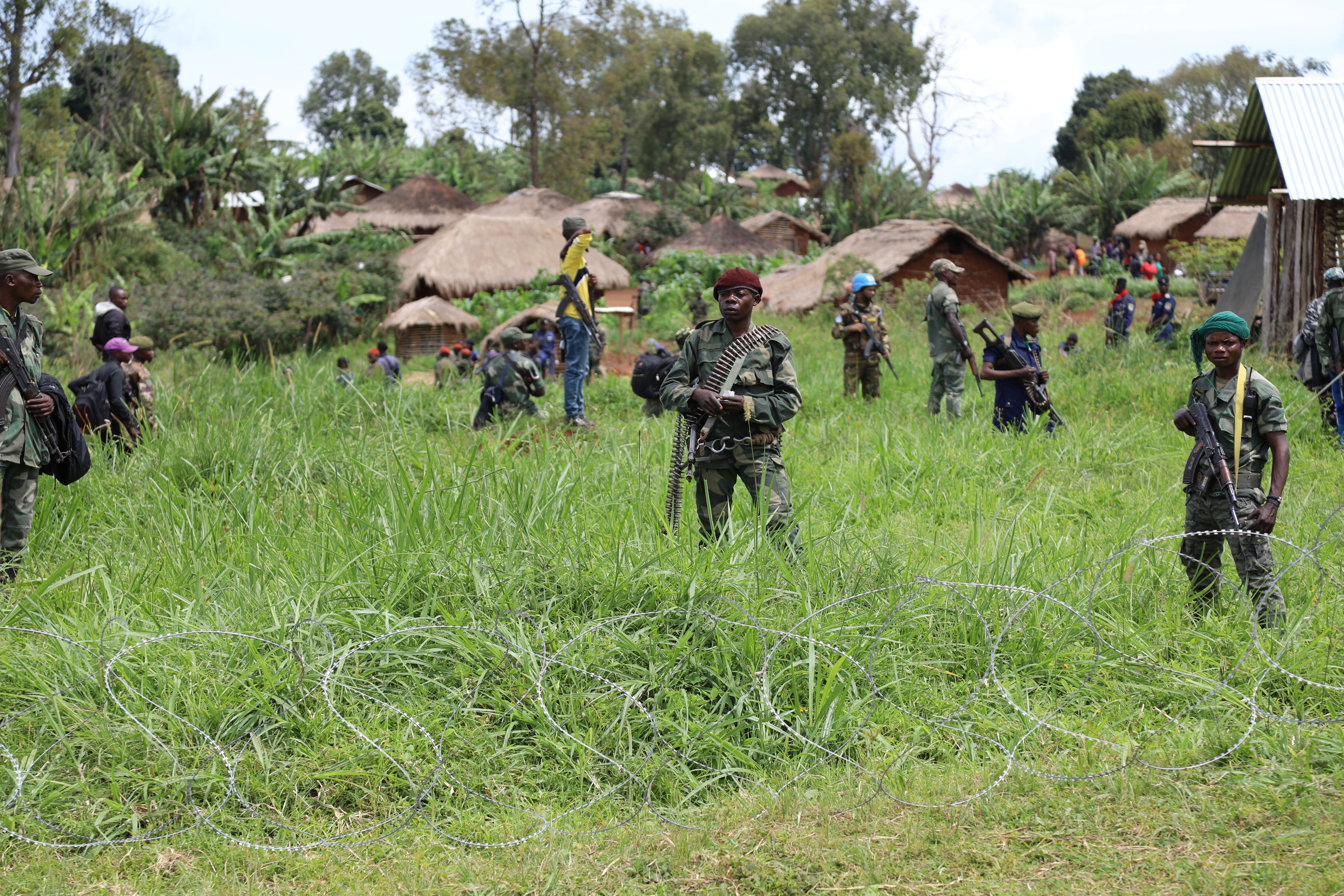
- FRPI milicians in 2019
- Leaders: Germain Katanga (POW); Baudouin Adirodo; Cobra Matata (surrendered) (POW)
- Dates active: 2002–
- Group: Ngiti (Lendu)
- Headquarters: Bunia, Ituri Province, D.R. Congo
- Active regions: Ituri Province, D.R. Congo
- Size: 1,000 (2015)
- Wars: Ituri conflict

The Front for Patriotic Resistance in Ituri (French: Force de résistance patriotique d'Ituri; FRPI) is a Bunia-based armed militia and political party primarily active in the south of the Ituri Province of northeastern Democratic Republic of the Congo (formerly the Orientale Province). It is a member of the Congo River Alliance.

== History ==
=== Origin ===
The FRPI was established in November 2002 from the Ngiti ethnolinguistic group, a subgroup of Lendu, as an ally to the Lendu-dominated Nationalist and Integrationist Front (FNI). The Ngiti, organized under traditional leaders, thus formed a counterweight to the Rwanda-backed and Hema-dominated Union of Congolese Patriots (UPC) in the Ituri conflict. The FRPI was supported by the Uganda-backed Forces for Renewal faction of the Rally for Congolese Democracy. In 2002–2003, the FRPI received support from both the Armed Forces of the Democratic Republic of the Congo (FARDC) and Uganda People's Defence Force (UPDF) in fighting against the UPC. Both the DRC and Uganda had also assisted in the initial creation of the FRPI and FNI, though neither group ever established full control over Lendu fighters in Ituri.

=== Operations ===
In May 2003, the FRPI reportedly had 9,000 combatants and be closely linked to the FNI. By 2015, this number was estimated to have declined to 1,000. In February 2003, the FRPI participated in the Bogoro massacre with the FNI. The FRPI joined the UPDF in a successful March 2003 offensive against the UPC and jointly occupied the town with the FNI in May 2003. In 2006, the Congolese government signed a ceasefire with the FRPI and other rebel groups active in the northeast of the country. Though 15,000 FRPI soldiers were demobilized as part of the peace process and many commanders integrated into the FARDC, violent FRPI activity returned in 2008 with attacks by residual FRPI forces against Ituri villages and FARDC camps. In September 2008, FRPI commanders splintered off to form the Popular Front for Justice in Congo (FPJC). Whereas its ally the FNI largely transformed into a political party in 2005, the FPRI has resisted disarmament and demobilization campaigns. In the 2010s, the FARDC launched search operations against the FRPI, deemed the most successful government operations since the 2013 defeat of the March 23 Movement by United Nations (UN) envoy Martin Kobler.

Initially led by Germain Katanga, FRPI leadership switched in 2005 to Baudouin Adirodo. Katanga was arrested and flown to the International Criminal Court at The Hague in October 2007 to face charges of war crimes and crimes against humanity, including the use of child soldiers and promotion of sexual slavery. He was found guilty in March 2014. He was released from prison in March 2020 after International Criminal Court reduced his sentence from 12 to 6 years.

FRPI signed a peace accord on February 28, 2020 with the government of DRC in presence of the UN. The accord provided the integration of FRPI fighters into the army and a ceasefire. Rebel fighters who have no committed war crimes or crimes against humanity were provided amnesty by the accord.

Despite the peace deal signed in March 2020, fighting between the government of DRC and FRPI happened on overnight of 30 December. Six FRPI fighters, three government soldiers, and two civilians were killed in the fighting.
