= Union of Congolese Patriots =

DRC political party and militia

- Union des Patriotes Congolais
- Leader: Thomas Lubanga Dyilo
- Dates active: 2001–present
- Active regions: DRC–Rwandan border
- Ideology: Congolese nationalism
- Wars: Second Congo War, Ituri conflict and Kivu conflict

The Union of Congolese Patriots (French: Union des Patriotes congolais, or UPC) is a political and militia group in Ituri, northeastern Democratic Republic of the Congo, formed towards the end of the Second Congo War. It was founded by Thomas Lubanga in 2001 and was one of six such groups that sprung up in the mineral-rich Ituri region on the border with Uganda in the Ituri conflict. The UPC supported and was primarily composed of the Hema ethnic group.

== History ==
What began as a struggle for control over land and resources, broke out into ethnic warfare as atrocities increased and as arms from Uganda and Rwanda became available, and units of the Ugandan army became involved. By February 2003, the UPC was said to have fielded an estimated 15,000 soldiers. The UPC carried out numerous attacks upon civilians and other serious human rights abuses in pursuit of its policies.

In August 2002, the UPC took control of the town of Bunia with the help of Ugandan forces, following which it received support from Rwanda. In late 2003, the UPC split into several factions: one led by Kisembo Bahemuka and known as the UPC-Kisembo (UPC-K), another under Thomas Lubanga and known as the UPC-Lubanga (UPC-L), and the Parti pour l'unité et la sauvegarde de l'intégrité du Congo (PUSIC) – Party for Unity and Safeguarding of the Integrity of Congo, formed by Mandro Panga Kahwa. The UPC-L was militarily stronger as most of the militia stayed with Lubanga. After the 2004 accords most of the UPC-K eventually merged into PUSIC.

The UPC-L was implicated in the deaths of nine Bangladeshi MONUC peacekeepers on 25 March 2005. Lubanga was arrested along with Floribert Ndjabu, leader of the Nationalist and Integrationist Front. In March 2006, Lubanga was arrested under a warrant issued by the International Criminal Court for the alleged war crime of using child soldiers, and was flown to the Netherlands.

Bosco Ntaganda was named its leader in his absence. Human Rights Watch states that between August 2002 and March 2003, the UPC arrested and tortured over 100 opponents, was responsible for the murder of a Kenyan peacekeeper in January 2004 and the kidnapping of a Moroccan peacekeeper later that year. In January 2005, Commander Bosco Ntaganda was offered a position as a general in the national Forces Armées de la République Démocratique du Congo (FARDC), but had refused the post.

The UPC won three National Assembly seats in the 2006 general elections.

== Military wing ==
The military wing of the party was called the Patriotic Forces for the Liberation of Congo (Forces Patriotiques pour la libération du Congo, FPLC) and was under the command of Thomas Lubanga with Bosco Ntaganda as Deputy Chief of the General Staff. Upon Lubanga's arrest, Ntaganda assumed the rank of Commander of the FPLC. On 10 February 2006, Thomas Lubanga was arrested in Kinshasa by Congolese authorities, and transferred to The Hague on 16 March 2.
