= List of armed groups in the Democratic Republic of the Congo =

This is a list of armed groups active in the Democratic Republic of the Congo since the end of Second Congo War in 2003.

Rebel group	Subgroups / Affiliates	Year Established	Leader	Notes
AFRC (Alliance des Forces de Résistance Congolaise)			Charles Bokande † “Je t’aime”	
Alliance of Patriots for a Free and Sovereign Congo (APCLS)		2010	Janvier Karairi	
Allied Democratic Forces (ADF)		1996	Jamil Mukulu (POW) (leader until 2015); Musa Baluku(leader 2015–2019; commander of pro-ISIL faction from 2019) "Muzaaya" (commander of Mukulu loyalists from 2019); Dusman Sabuni †	
Amka Jeshi		2020	Kasereka Celestin	
APRC (Armée du Peuple pour la Reconstruction du Congo)			Kambale Defao	
APR (Armée patriotique de Ruwenzori)			Meso	
Chini ya Tuna				
CMC/FAPC (Collectif des Mouvements pour le Changement/Forces armées du peuple congolais)				
National Coalition of the People for the Sovereignty of Congo (CNPSC)	Mai-Mai Yakutumba	2006	William Yakutumba	
National Coalition of the People for the Sovereignty of Congo (CNPSC)	Mai-Mai Echilo			
National Coalition of the People for the Sovereignty of Congo (CNPSC)	Mai-Mai Réunion (FPLC; Forces pour la libération du Congo)	2017	Réunion wa Rusasa	
National Coalition of the People for the Sovereignty of Congo (CNPSC)	Mai-Mai Réné	2016	Rene Itongwa	
National Coalition of the People for the Sovereignty of Congo (CNPSC)	Mai-Mai Ngalyabatu		Ngalyabatu Mangala	
National Coalition of the People for the Sovereignty of Congo (CNPSC)	Biloze Bishambuke	1998	Assani Mbokani	
National Coalition of the People for the Sovereignty of Congo (CNPSC)	Mai-Mai Mulumba		Mulumba Hondwa	
National Coalition of the People for the Sovereignty of Congo (CNPSC)	Mai-Mai Malaika		Sheikh Assani (until 2020) Kabala (2020–)	
National Coalition of the People for the Sovereignty of Congo (CNPSC)	Mai-Mai Napata			
National Coalition of the People for the Sovereignty of Congo (CNPSC)	Forces des patriotes pour la défense du Congo - Mouvement de libération (FDPC-ML)	2016	Kitungano Kibukila alias Ebuela; Kakobanya Nakalambi; Aoci Katumba	
Groupe JKK / CCCRD (Coalition Congolaise pour le Changement Radical et la Démocratie)		2020	Chimpanzé Hakizimwami	
National Council for the Democratic Renewal (CNRD)		2016	Colonel Wilson Irategeka # (2016–2020)	
Busumba group				
FAP (Force d’Autodéfense Populaire)			Kasereka Ngesera	
Forces de défense du Congo (FDC)			Butu Luanda; Charles Mbura (until 2013; split into MAC); Madragul	
Forces de défense du Congo (FDC)	FDC–Tumusifu	2016	Tumusifu †	
Democratic Forces for the Liberation of Rwanda (FDLR)		2000	Omega; Gaby Ruhinda	
FNL (Front national de libération)			Aloys Nzabampema	
FNL (Front national de libération)	FNL Nibizi		Shuti Baryanka † Nibizi	
Popular Forces of Burundi (FOREBU/FPB)		2016	Jérémie Ntiranyibagira; Edouard Nshimirimana	
FLEC/NG (Front de Libération à L’Est du Congo/Nouvelle Génération)			Lwanga	
Patriotic Resistance Front of Ituri (FRPI)		2002	Germain Katanga (POW); Baudouin Adirodo; Cobra Matata (surrendered) (POW)	
Chini Ya Kilima–FPIC (Front des Patriotes Intégrationnistes du Congo)				
Mai-Mai Kabidon FPP/AP (Front Populaire pour la Paix Armée du Peuple)			Kasereka Kasyano aka Kabido; Freddy	
Groupe Mazout		2017	Sensele aka Mazout	
Gumino			Nyamusharaba Shaka	
Imbonerakure				
LD Mahinduzi			Prosper Mahinduzi	
LD Mbilize				
Local Defense Ngengwe			Ngengwe	
LD Zone			Zone	
Mai-Mai Alaise		2017	Alaise	
Mai-Mai Alida		2020	Alonda Bita aka Alida	
Mai-Mai Aochi			Aochi	
Mai-Mai Apa na Pale		2014	Mundusi/Mundus Munanga Babuyu	
Mai-Mai Barcelone		2019	Mumbere Baraka Lolwako	
Mai-Mai Bede		2003 – 2015	Bede Rusagara (2003 – 2015) †	Defunct after death of their leader
Mai-Mai Kivuwhe				
Mai-Mai Bishake				
Mai-Mai Brown			Omari Brown	
Mai-Mai Buhirwha				
Corps du Christ		2016	David Maranatha	
Mai-Mai Dario			Dario Syaghuswa	
Mai-Mai Délégués				
Mai-Mai Éléments Katadaye		2020	Katadaye	
Mai-Mai Éléments Mutono		2016	Mutono Mukambila	
Mai-Mai Fimbo na Fimbo			Bitonto	
Mai-Mai Ilunga		2018	Ilunga Rusesama	
Mai-Mai Issa Mutoka			Issa Mutoka	
Mai-Mai Karakara		2013 – 2018	Karakara Espoir (2013–April 2018) † Brother of Karakara (April 2018) †	Defunct after death of their leader
Mai-Mai Kashumba		2018	Kashumba Musagara	
Mai-Mai Kidjangala/Kijangala			Kijangala	
Mai-Mai Kifagiyo				
Mai-Mai Kifuafua		2002	Delphin Mbaenda	
Mai-Mai Kifuafua	Mai-Mai Kifuafua Baeni-Limenzi		Baeni Limenzi	
Mai-Mai Kifuafua	Mai-Mai Kifuafua Maachano		Maachano	
Mai-Mai Kifuafua	Mai-Mai Kifuafua Shalio		Shabani Shalio	
Mai-Mai Kihebe				
Mai-Mai Kilolo				
Mai-Mai Kirikicho		1992	Kirikicho Mirimba Mwanamayi	
Mai-Mai Kithikyolo		2009	Vital Kithikyolo	
Mai-Mai Kombi		2017	Kambale Kombi	
Mai-Mai Léopards		2016	Kakule Endaniluhi Muthundo Mutsuva Kikongo and Fabrice	
Mai-Mai Mahoro			Mahoro (until 2017) †	
Mai-Mai Makanaki			John Simbira Makanaki	
Mai-Mai Mandefu/Mandevu		2019	Nzirunga and Aminata	
Mai-Mai Maradona				
Mazembe		2016	Albert Kasheke Kitete Bushu (2016–2020) † Kabido	
Mazembe	Mazembe-APASIKO (Alliance des Patriotes pour le Salut Intégral du Kongo)	2019	David Kiboko	
Mai-Mai Mazimano			Mazimano	
Mai-Mai Mbulu			Kamale Mbulu; Bigaya; Mahugo	
Mai-Mai Muhima			Muhima	
Mai-Mai Mundos				
Mai-Mai Mupekenya			Kati Malisawa	
Mai-Mai Mushombe		2015	Mushombe Muganguzi	
Mai-Mai Mwenyemali			Mwenyemali	
Mai-Mai Ngolenge			Burairi	
Mai-Mai Nguru		2005	Nguru	
Mai-Mai Ninja			Kambale Aziza	
Mai-Mai Nyerere			Nyerere Bunane	
Mai-Mai PRM/PAREM				
Mai-Mai Rasta				
Mai-Mai Ruma/Zela Mbuma			Ruma and Zela Mbuma	
Mai-Mai Rushaba		2014		
Mai-Mai Shingo Pamba		2020	Matabishi Kakuhi Jackson alias Prof Kitwa	
Mai-Mai Shoshi		2019	Jimmy Kidegi	
Mai-Mai Simuzizi		2012/4 – 2016	Simuzizi Labani (2012/4 – 2016) †	Defunct after death of their leader
Mai-Mai Kivuwhe				
Mai-Mai Kiwis				
Milice M'vuba				
Milice Pakombe			Mwami Mbonguma Kitobi (until 2014)	
March 23 Movement (M23)		2012	Bertrand Bisimwa (president); Sultani Makenga (military chief); Jean-Marie Runiga Lugerero (former president)	
MAC, ex-Guides (Mouvement d’Action pour Changement))		2013	Mbura	
Mai-Mai Jackson MFP (Mouvement du front populaire)		2020	Jackson Muhukambuto (2020–2021) (POW)	
Mai-Mai Kyandenga MNLDK (Mouvement National pour la Libération Durable du Kongo)		2016	Kambale Kyandenga (until 2022) (surrendered); Kambale Matabishi (until 2024) (surrendered)	Split from UPLC, now allied with ADF
Nduma Defense of Congo (NDC)			Sheka Ntabo Ntaberi (until 2017) (surrendered); Mandaima (2017–)	
Nduma Defense of Congo-Renovated (NDC-R)	Nduma Defense of Congo-Renovated/Bwira	2020	Gilbert Bwira	
Nduma Defense of Congo-Renovated (NDC-R)	Nduma Defense of Congo-Renovated/Guidon	2015	Guidon Shimiray Mwissa (2015–2021) (surrendered)	
Nyatura	Nyatura-APRDC (Alliance des Patriotes pour la Restauration de la Démocratie au Congo)		Benjamin Ndikuyeze Bigirabagabo	
Nyatura	Nyatura Bagaruza		Ntuye, alias Tapis Rouge (until 2019) Kagiri (2019–)	
Nyatura	Nyatura Bavuga			
Nyatura	Nyatura Bizagwira		Bizagwira Muhindi	
Nyatura	Nyatura CMC (Collectif des Mouvements pour le Changement)	2014		
Nyatura	Nyatura Delta FDDH (Forces de défense des droits humains)	2012	Delta Gashamare (2012–2020) (surrendered) Manga (2020) †	
Nyatura	Nyatura FPDH (Force de Défense du Peuple Hutu)	2020	Sore India	
Nyatura	Nyatura FPPH (Forces pour la Protection du Peuple Hutu)		Soki † Kasongo (until 2016)	
Nyatura	Nyatura GAV (Groupe armé les volontaires)			
Nyatura	Nyatura Jean-Marie		Jean-Marie Nzayimana	
Nyatura	Nyatura JED		Faustin Bavakure	
Nyatura	Nyatura Kalume		Matias Kalume Kage	
Nyatura	Nyatura Kasongo	2011	Kasongo Kalamo	
Nyatura	Nyatura Kavumbi (until 2019) (surrendered)			
Nyatura	Nyatura Mahanga		Rafiki Mahanga	
Nyatura	Nyatura Mudogo			
Nyatura	Nyatura Musheku			
Nyatura	Nyatura Nduhuye			
Nyatura	Nyatura Turarambiwe (Rutshuru)		“Col.” Niyonzima (formerly); Mamba Baziyaka; Bosse Mbarushimana	
Mai-Mai Uhuru OAPB (Organisation d’Autodéfense pour la Paix à Beni)			Commander Kasereka Muhasa Uhuru	
PERCI		2007		
PERCI	PERCI John Majimbo			
PERCI	PERCI Kaomba	2017	Mukalay Yumba aka Kaomba	
PERCI	PERCI Mpululu		Chief Mukimbo (until 2020) †; Mpululu Katalushi (2020–)	
PERCI	PERCI Nyumbaisha		Luhala (until 2013) †; Nyumbaisha Mukalay (2013–)	
Pisteurs		2015		
Raia Mutomboki	RM 100 kg		100 kg	
Raia Mutomboki	RM Akilo		Akilo	
Raia Mutomboki	RM Bipopa		Bipopa (aka Chipopa)	
Raia Mutomboki	RM Blaise		Blaise	
Raia Mutomboki	RM Bozi		Bozi	
Raia Mutomboki	RM Bralima		Bralima Kelele (–2021) (surrendered)	
Raia Mutomboki	RM Butachibera		Butachibera Mwindja; Weteshi Kabanzi	
Raia Mutomboki	RM Charles Quint	2014	Charles Quint	
Raia Mutomboki	RM Dembi		Dembi	
Raia Mutomboki	Raia Mutomboki Donat aka FPP		Major Donat Kengwa Omari; Major Ngandu Lundimu (–2020) (surrendered)	
Raia Mutomboki	Raia Mutomboki Elenge	2012 or 2013	Heritier Elenge Mupenge	
Raia Mutomboki	RM Habikuangaliye		Habikuangaliye	
Raia Mutomboki	RM Hamakombo		Bwaare Hamakombo	
Raia Mutomboki	RM Imani Bitaa		Imani Bitaa	
Raia Mutomboki	RM Jean Musumbu		Jean Musumbu	
Raia Mutomboki	RM Kabazimia		Kabazimia	
Raia Mutomboki	RM Kabé		Kabé	
Raia Mutomboki	RM Kadaradara		Kadaradara	
Raia Mutomboki	RM Kampanga		Kampanga	
Raia Mutomboki	RM Kasosoli		Kasosoli	
Raia Mutomboki	RM Kazimoto	2018	Kazimoto (2018) †	
Raia Mutomboki	RM Kikwama		Kikwama	
Raia Mutomboki	RM Kimba		Kimba	
Raia Mutomboki	Raia Mutomboki Kisekelwa		Kisekelwa	
Raia Mutomboki	RM Kokodikoko		Kokodikoko (–2019) (POW)	
Raia Mutomboki	RM Lance		Lance	
Raia Mutomboki	RM LeFort		LeFort	
Raia Mutomboki	RM Lukoba		Lukoba	
Raia Mutomboki	RM Mabala	2012	Mabala Wemba Mese (2012–2020) †; Justin Mabala (2020–2022) (surrendered)	
Raia Mutomboki	RM Mabuli		Mabuli Mwanadamu (–2021) (surrendered)	
Raia Mutomboki	RM Machite		Machite	
Raia Mutomboki	RM Maheshe	2013	Kashi Maheshe (2013–2020) (surrendered)	
Raia Mutomboki	RM Makindu		Makindu	
Raia Mutomboki	Raia Mutomboki Mamba		Mamba	
Raia Mutomboki	Raia Mutomboki Manyilisa		Manyilisa	
Raia Mutomboki	Raia Mutomboki Mirage		Mirage Bitunya (–2020) (surrendered)	
Raia Mutomboki	RM Mungoro		Mungoro Matafali	
Raia Mutomboki	RM Musolwa		Musolwa (–2021) (surrendered)	
Raia Mutomboki	RM Ndarumanga		Munyololo Mbao aka Ndarumanga (2012–2021) (POW)	
Raia Mutomboki	RM Ndusha		Ndusha	
Raia Mutomboki	RM Ngongo Lutete		Ngongo Lutete	
Raia Mutomboki	RM Omela	2018	Omela (2018–2021) (POW) #	
Raia Mutomboki	RM Puchi		Puchi	
Raia Mutomboki	Raia Mutomboki Safari		Safari (–2019) (surrendered)	
Raia Mutomboki	RM Safari Ngorongo		Safari Ngorongo (–2019) (surrendered)	
Raia Mutomboki	RM Shabani		Shabani	
Raia Mutomboki	Raia Mutomboki Shebitembe		Shebitembe	
Raia Mutomboki	Raia Mutomboki Shemakingi		Shemakingi	
Raia Mutomboki	RM Shukuru	2013	Shukuru Kawaya (2013–2019) (surrendered)	
Raia Mutomboki	RM Soleil		Soleil	
Raia Mutomboki	RM Vunja Vikwazo		Vunja Vikwazo (–2019) (surrendered)	
Raia Mutomboki	RM Walike		Walike	
RM Wemba			Kikukala Wemba (2018) †	
RUD-Urunana (Rassemblement Unité et Démocratie)		2004	Jean-Damascène Ndibabaje, aka Musare (2007–2016) †; Juvenal Musabyimana aka Jean-Michel Africa (2016–2019) †; Cyprien Leo Mpiranya aka Kagoma (2019–2020) †; Emmanuel Rugema (2020) †; Cassien Nshimiyimana aka Gavana (2020–2022) †; Nsengiyunva Emmanuel aka Faida Hakimu (2022–)	Split from FDLR
RNL (Résistance Nationale Lumumbiste)		2016		
RED-Tabara (Résistance pour un état de droit)		2015	Kisiga Ndagizimana Gervé	
Rwanda National Congress (RNC)			Kayumba Nyamwasa	
Mai-Mai Simba	Mai-Mai Simba FDS (Forces Divines Simba)		Mando Mazeri	
Mai-Mai Simba	Mai-Mai Simba UPLD (Union des Patriotes pour la Libération et le Développement)		General Michigan; Luc Yabili (2007–2022) #	
Mai-Mai Simba	Mai-Mai Simba (Manu)		Paul Sadala (aka ‘Morgan’) (until 2014) †; Manu (2014–2019) †	
Mai-Mai Simba	Mai-Mai Simba Mangalibi		Mangalibi	
Twigwaneho		2000		
Twigwaneho Makanika		2020	Michel Rukundo Makanika	
Union des patriotes pour la libération du Congo (UPLC)		2016	Katembo Kilalo; Mambari Bini Pélé (alias Saperita)	
UPCP (Union des patriotes congolais pour la paix)		2008	Kakule Sikuli Lafontaine (2008–2015); Muhambalyaki (2015–2017) (POW)	
UPDC Kapasi (Union des Patriotes pour le Défense du Congo)			Birikoriko Mingenya (until 2020) (surrendered); Kapasi	
CODECO			Justin Ngudjolo (until 2020) †	
CODECO	CODECO–ALC (Armée de Libération du Congo)	2020	Justin Maki Gesi aka “Le Petit Loup de la Montagne”	
CODECO	CODECO–BTD (Bon Temple de Dieu)	2020	Tuwo(until 2021) †; Kadogo	
CODECO	CODECO-ARDPC	2020	Songa Mbele (2020–2022) (surrendered)	
CODECO	CODECO-FDBC (Forces contre la balkanisation du Congo)	2020	Chui Mutambala	
CODECO	CODECO-URDPC (Union des Révolutionnaires pour le Développement du Peuple Congolais)	2020	Ngudjolo Mapa (until 2020) †; Charité Nguna Kiza	
Zaïre-FPAC (Front populaire d’autodéfense en Ituri)		2020	Zawadi Vajeru	Anti-CODECO
Mai-Mai Yira				

== See also ==
- List of factions in the Ituri war (2017-present)

== Sources ==
- Kivu Security Tracker: Armed Groups
