= List of wars involving Zimbabwe =

This is a list of wars involving the Republic of Zimbabwe.

Conflict	Zimbabwe and allies	Opponents	Results
Rhodesian Bush War (1964–1979)	ZANU (ZANLA); ZAPU (ZIPRA); (People's Republic of Mozambique) Mozambique; ANC (MK); Zambia	Rhodesia (1964–1979); Zimbabwe Rhodesia (1979); Portugal (1964–1974) (Note: Portuguese forces assisted the Rhodesians in cross-border operations into Portuguese Mozambique. See Operation Flotilla and Operation Birch.); South Africa (from 1967)	Stalemate: Lancaster House Agreement; End to armed hostilities; Free elections with ZANU and ZAPU participation; Formation of Zimbabwe; Rhodesia disestablished; Zimbabwe gains internationally recognised independence in its place.
Entumbane I (1980)	Zimbabwe: Zimbabwe Defence Forces; Zimbabwe Republic Police	ZIPRA elements ZANLA elements	Government victory: Uprising put down.
Entumbane II (1981)	Zimbabwe	ZIPRA elements ZANLA elements	Government victory: Uprising put down
Mozambican Civil War (1977–1992)	Mozambique (People's Republic until 1990): FRELIMO; ZANU (until 1979); Zimbabwe (from 1980); Tanzania; Malawi (from 1987); Soviet Union	RENAMO; PRM (until 1982); COREMO; UNAMO (1990-1992) (Note: UNAMO was founded in 1987 as a splinter of RENAMO, arguing that RENAMO had become a tribal vehicle for the Ndau, and that UNAMO would be the defenders of the Sena. UNAMO would fight both FRELIMO and RENAMO until reconciling with RENAMO in 1990.); UNIPOMO; FUMO; Supported by: Rhodesia (until 1979) South Africa (from 1978) UNAMO (1987-1990); Supported by Malawi (1987-1992) (Note: UNAMO's main sponsor, they would continue to support them post-reconciliation even allowing them to operate in Malawi, despite openly sending troops to aid FRELIMO.)	Stalemate: Rome General Peace Accords, multiparty elections
Gukurahundi (1984–1987)	Zimbabwe	ZAPU	Government victory: Unity agreement, formation of ZANU–PF
Second Congo War (1998–2003)	Pro-government: DR Congo; Angola; Chad; Namibia; Zimbabwe; Sudan (alleged); Anti-Ugandan forces: LRA; ADF; UNRF II; FNI; Anti-Rwandan militias: FDLR; (Rwanda) ALiR; Interahamwe; RDR; Mai-Mai; Other Hutu-aligned forces; Anti-Burundi militias: CNDD-FDD; FROLINA	Rwandan-aligned militias: RCD; RCD-Goma; Banyamulenge; Ugandan-aligned militias: MLC; Forces for Renewal; UPC; Other Tutsi-aligned forces; Anti-Angolan forces: UNITA; Foreign state actors: Uganda; Rwanda; Burundi; Note: Rwanda and Uganda fought a short war in June 2000 over Congolese territory.	Stalemate: Assassination of Laurent-Désiré Kabila; Sun City Agreement; Creation of a unified, multi-party government in DR Congo, with Joseph Kabila as president; Pretoria Accord; Rwandan withdrawal from DR Congo in exchange for commitment towards the disarmament of Hutu militias.; The Transitional Government of the Democratic Republic of the Congo is established, deployment of MONUC.; End of the Angolan Civil War.; Continuation of the Ituri conflict.; Start of the Kivu conflict.
Kivu Conflict (2004–present)	Pro-government: DR Congo; (Democratic Republic of the Congo) Wazalendo (March 2024–); NDC-R; Burundi; (United Nations) MONUSCO; Angola; Zimbabwe; Botswana (against FNL and FNL–Nzabampema); Supported by: France; Belgium; Bulgaria; Horațiu Potra's Mercenary Legion (until 31 Jan 2025)	Rwandan-aligned militias: CNDP; Congo River Alliance; M23; Banyamulenge; Twigwaneho; Gumino; Ugandan-aligned militias: FPRI; FPLC; FPDC; Foreign state actors: Uganda; Rwanda; Anti-Ugandan forces: IS-CAP; ADF-Baluku; ADF-Mukulu; Mai-Mai Kyandenga; UPLC; Anti-Rwandan militias: FDLR; RUD-Urunana; Other Hutu-aligned forces; Nyatura; Anti-Burundi militias: RED-Tabara; FNL; Mai-Mai militias: NDC-R (until March 2024); FPP-AP; AFRC; RNL; Mazembe; Kifuafua; Simba; MAC; Raia Mutomboki; Buhirwa; Kidjangala; Fuliru Mai-Mai; Makanaki; Biloze Bishambuke; CNPSC; Alaise; CODECO (in Ituri); Chini ya Kilima–FPIC (in Ituri); (Zaire) Zaïre-FPAC (in Ituri)	Ongoing: FARDC victory against the CNDP in 2009 and the M23 movement in 2012; CNDP becomes a political party in the DRC; M23 movement signs peace agreement with the DRC government; renews fighting in 2022; European Community of Africa Conflict breaks out between Rwanda and the Congo in 2022; FDLR, Mai-Mai militias and other armed groups still active in Eastern DRC; UN and FARDC begin operation to defeat the FDLR and their allies at the start of 2015
