= List of wars involving the Democratic Republic of the Congo =

This is a list of wars involving the Democratic Republic of the Congo.

== Congo Free State (1885–1908) ==
Conflict	Combatants		Result	Sovereign
Stairs Expedition (1891–1892)	Congo Free State	Yeke Kingdom	Victory: Msiri killed, end of the Yeke Kingdom	Leopold II of Belgium
Congo–Arab War (1892–1894)	Congo Free State; Supported by: Belgium	(Muscat and Oman) Sultanate of Utetera (Muscat and Oman) Arab-Swahili sultanates in Eastern Congo; Supported by: Sultanate of Zanzibar; Sultanate of Muscat	Congo Free State victory	Leopold II of Belgium
Batetela Rebellion (1895–1908)	Congo Free State	Tetela rebels	Victory	Leopold II of Belgium
Mahdist War (1881–1899)	United Kingdom • Egypt • India • Canada • New South Wales; Italy • (Kingdom of Italy) Eritrea; Ethiopia; Congo Free State	Mahdist State	Allied victory: Sudanese invasions of neighbours repelled; Establishment of Anglo-Egyptian Sudan, a polity jointly ruled by Britain and Egypt; Kassala temporarily occupied by Italy; Congo secures the Lado Enclave until 1910	Leopold II of Belgium

== Republic of the Congo (Léopoldville) (1960–1971) ==
Conflict	Combatants		Result	President
Congo Crisis (1960–1965)	1960–1963: (Democratic Republic of the Congo) Republic of the Congo; Supported by: Soviet Union (1960); (United Nations) ONUC (Note: ONUC, the United Nations Operation in the Congo, included troops from Ghana, Tunisia, Morocco, Ethiopia, Ireland, Guinea, Sweden, Mali, Sudan, Liberia, Canada, India, Indonesia and the United Arab Republic among others.)	1960–1963: Katanga; South Kasai; Supported by: Belgium (Note: The secession of Katanga and South Kasai was also supported by South Africa, France, Portuguese Angola and the neighbouring Central African Federation. However, neither was ever officially recognised by any state.); 1960–1962: (Democratic Republic of the Congo) Free Republic of the Congo; Supported by: Soviet Union	West-Congolese victory (Phase 1): Katanga and South Kasai reincorporated into the Congo, Stanleyville government exiled	Joseph Kasa-Vubu
Congo Crisis (1960–1965)	1963–1965: Democratic Republic of the Congo; United States; Belgium; Supported by: (United Nations) ONUC (1964)	1963–1965: Kwilu and Simba rebels; Supported by: Soviet Union; China; Cuba	Government victory (Phase 2): Defeat of the Simba Rebellion; The Congo established as an independent unitary state under the authoritarian presidency of Mobutu Sese Seko.	Joseph Kasa-Vubu
First Stanleyville Mutiny (1966)	Congo-Léopoldville	(State of Katanga) Mutineers	Victory: Mutiny crushed	Mobutu Sese Seko
Second Stanleyville Mutiny (1967)	Congo-Léopoldville	(State of Katanga) Mutineers	Victory: Mutiny crushed	Mobutu Sese Seko

== Zaire (1971–1997) ==
Conflict	Combatants		Result	President
Angolan Civil War (1975)	Democratic People's Republic of Angola: UNITA; FNLA (from 1975) South Africa (from 1975); Zaire (1975) FLEC	People's Republic of Angola: MPLA; Cuba (from 1975); SWAPO (from 1975); ANC (from 1975); Executive Outcomes (until 1995); FLNC (from 1975) Military advisers and pilots: Soviet Union (from 1975); East Germany (from 1975)	MPLA victory	Mobutu Sese Seko
Shaba I (1977)	Zaire; Morocco; Egypt; France; Belgium; Supported by: United States; Saudi Arabia; Sudan; Nigeria	Congolese National Liberation Front (FNLC) Supported by: Angola; Cuba; Soviet Union; East Germany	Zairian victory: FNLC expelled from Shaba	Mobutu Sese Seko
Shaba II (1978)	Zaire; France; Belgium; Morocco; United States	FNLC	Zairian victory: Mutual end of support for other nations' rebel groups	Mobutu Sese Seko
Chadian–Libyan Conflict (1978–1987)	Anti-Libyan Chadian factions: FAT (1978–1979); FAN (1978–1983); FANT (1983–1987); GUNT (1986–1987); France; Inter-African Force: Zaire; Nigeria; Senegal; NFSL Supported by: DR Sudan (1978–1985); Sudan (1985–1987); Egypt (1977-1981); Israel; Iraq; Algeria (pre-reapproachment); United States	Libya: Islamic Legion; Pro-Libyan Chadian factions: FROLINAT; GUNT (1979–1986); Codos (1983–1986); FAP (1978–1986); Pro-Libyan Palestinian and Lebanese groups: PLO (1987); Abu Nidal Organization; Supported by: Algeria; East Germany; Soviet Union	Chadian and French victory: Chad regains control of the Aouzou Strip.	Mobutu Sese Seko
Rwandan Civil War (1990–1994)	Rwanda; Zaire (1990); France	Rwandan Patriotic Front (RPF)	Rwandan Patriotic Front (RPF) victory	Mobutu Sese Seko
First Congo War (1996–1997)	Zaire: FAZ; White Legion; Sudan; Chad (Rwanda) Ex-FAR/ALiR; Interahamwe; CNDD-FDD; UNITA; ADF; FLNC; LRA; UNRF II; Supported by: France; Central African Republic; China; Israel; Kuwait (denied) Mai-Mai (Note: Many Mai-Mai militias in eastern Zaire initially allied themselves with Rwanda and the AFDL against Hutu militants and refugees. As soon as most Hutu were driven away, however, many Mai-Mai groups turned against Rwanda and the AFDL. Despite this, some anti-Hutu Mai-Mai remained allied with Rwanda and the AFDL.)	(Democratic Republic of the Congo) AFDL; Rwanda; Uganda; Burundi; Angola (South Sudan) SPLA; Eritrea; Supported by: South Africa; Zambia; Zimbabwe; Ethiopia; Tanzania; United States (covertly) Mai-Mai	AFDL victory: Overthrow of the Mobutu regime; Zaire renamed back to the Democratic Republic of the Congo; Installation of Laurent-Désiré Kabila as president; Beginning of Second Congo War	Mobutu Sese Seko

== Democratic Republic of the Congo (from 1997) ==
Conflict	Combatants		Result	President
Congo-Brazzaville Civil War (1997–1999)	Armed Forces of the Republic of the Congo (to October 1997); Cocoye Militia; Ninja Militia; Nsiloulou; Supported by: Jonas Savimbi; FLEC; Supported by: DR Congo	Armed Forces of the Republic of the Congo (from October 1997); Cobra Militia (Rwanda) Rwandan Hutu Militia; Angola; Chad	Nguesso loyalist victory: Denis Sassou Nguesso returns to power	Laurent-Désiré Kabila
Ituri conflict (1972-2003)	Hema ethnic group: UPC; RCD/K-ML; FAPC; Uganda DR Congo (FARDC); UN (MONUC); EU (Artemis)	Lendu ethnic group: FNI; FRPI; CODECO; FPJC; Mai-Mai Simba ADF (Islamic State) IS-CAP; Mai-Mai Kyandenga	Ongoing	Joseph Kabila (2001–2019) Félix Tshisekedi (since 2019)
Second Congo War (1998–2003)	Pro-government: DR Congo; Angola; Chad; Namibia; Zimbabwe; Sudan (alleged); Anti-Ugandan forces: LRA; ADF; UNRF II; FNI; Anti-Rwandan militias: FDLR; (Rwanda) ALiR; Interahamwe; RDR; Mai-Mai; Other Hutu-aligned forces; Anti-Burundi militias: CNDD-FDD; FROLINA	Rwandan-aligned militias: RCD; RCD-Goma; Banyamulenge; Ugandan-aligned militias: MLC; Forces for Renewal; UPC; Other Tutsi-aligned forces; Anti-Angolan forces: UNITA; Foreign state actors: Uganda; Rwanda; Burundi; Libya (alleged)	Military stalemate: Assassination of Laurent-Désiré Kabila; Sun City Agreement; Creation of a unified, multi-party government in DR Congo, with Joseph Kabila as president; Pretoria Accord; Rwandan withdrawal from DR Congo in exchange for commitment towards the disarmament of Hutu militias.; The Transitional Government of the Democratic Republic of the Congo is established, deployment of MONUC.; End of the Angolan Civil War.; Continuation of the Ituri conflict.; Start of the Kivu conflict.	Laurent-Désiré Kabila
Kivu Conflict (2004– present)	Pro-government: DR Congo; (Democratic Republic of the Congo) Wazalendo (March 2024–); NDC-R; Burundi; (United Nations) MONUSCO; Angola; Zimbabwe; Botswana (against FNL and FNL–Nzabampema); Supported by: France; Belgium; Bulgaria; Horațiu Potra's Mercenary Legion (until 31 Jan 2025)	Rwandan-aligned militias: CNDP; M23; Banyamulenge; Twigwaneho; Gumino; Ugandan-aligned militias: FPRI; FPLC; FPDC; Foreign state actors: Uganda; Rwanda; Anti-Ugandan forces: IS-CAP; ADF-Baluku; ADF-Mukulu; Mai-Mai Kyandenga; UPLC; Anti-Rwandan militias: FDLR; RUD-Urunana; Other Hutu-aligned forces; Nyatura; Anti-Burundi militias: RED-Tabara; FNL; Mai-Mai militias: NDC-R (until March 2024); FPP-AP; AFRC; RNL; Mazembe; Kifuafua; Simba; MAC; Raia Mutomboki; Buhirwa; Kidjangala; Fuliru Mai-Mai; Makanaki; Biloze Bishambuke; CNPSC; Alaise; CODECO (in Ituri); Chini ya Kilima–FPIC (in Ituri); (Zaire) Zaïre-FPAC (in Ituri)	Ongoing: FARDC victory against the CNDP in 2009 and the M23 movement in 2012; CNDP becomes a political party in the DRC; M23 movement signs peace agreement with the DRC government; renews fighting in 2022; Conflict breaks out between Rwanda and the Congo in 2022; FDLR, Mai-Mai militias and other armed groups still active in Eastern DRC; UN and FARDC begin operation to defeat the FDLR and their allies at the start of 2015	Joseph Kabila
LRA Insurgency (1987–present)	Uganda; Zaire (until 1997); DR Congo (from 1997); Central African Republic (from 2008); South Sudan; Arrow Boys; UFDR (United Nations) MONUC; Russia (since April 2024): Wagner Group; Supported by: United States (2011–2017) North Korea(until 1990s)	Lord's Resistance Army; Supported by: Sudan (1994–2002); Allied Democratic Forces	Ongoing (Low-level): Founder and leader of the LRA Joseph Kony goes into hiding; Senior LRA commander Dominic Ongwen surrenders to American forces in the Central African Republic and is tried at the Hague; Majority of LRA installations and encampments located in South Sudan and Uganda abandoned and dismantled; Small scale LRA activity continues in eastern DR Congo, and the Central African Republic	Joseph Kabila
Dongo Rebellion (2009)	Democratic Republic of the Congo Supported by: (United Nations) MONUC; Rwanda (alleged)	Lobala rebels Possibly: Resistance Patriots of Dongo	Victory: Rwandan-Congolese forces recaptured Dongo	Joseph Kabila
Katanga Insurgency (1963–present)	Congo-Léopoldville (until 1971); Zaire (1971–1997); DR Congo (from 1997); ONUC (until 1964); MONUSCO (since 1999); Local self-defence groups	Katangese rebels: Katangese Gendarmerie (1960s); FLNC (1967–1991); Mai Mai Kata Katanga (since 2011); Mai Mai Gédéon; CORAK; CPK; Alleged Support: FARDC elements Katangese businessmen FDLR; Mai Mai Yakutumba; CNPSC	Ongoing	Joseph Kabila
M23 Rebellion (2012–2013)	Democratic Republic of the Congo (United Nations) MONUSCO: (United Nations) Force Intervention Brigade; South Africa; Tanzania; Malawi	March 23 Movement; Alleged support: Uganda; Rwanda	Congolese government victory: M23 disarms and demobilises	Joseph Kabila
ADF Insurgency (1996–present)	Uganda DR Congo: Armed Forces (FARDC); MONUSCO: (United Nations) Force Intervention Brigade	ADF (1996–2015): NALU (early 1996); ISIL: IS-CAP; ADF-Baluku; ADF-Mukulu: NALU; RCD/K-ML: APC; Mai-Mai Kyandenga (2020–present); Supported by: FARDC elements LRA; Al-Shabaab (disputed); Various Jihadi groups (Ugandan and MONUSCO claim); Sudan (1990s; currently unknown)	Ongoing	Joseph Kabila
Central African Republic Civil War (2013–present)	Central African Republic; Central African Armed Forces; MINUSCA (since 2014); EUTM-RCA (since 2016) Rwanda (since 2020); Russia (since 2018); Wagner Group; Russian Imperial Movement; Black Russians; Azande Ani Kpi Gbe; Formerly: South Africa (2013); MISCA (2013–2014) MICOPAX (2008–2013): Angola; Cameroon; Chad; Morocco; Uganda; Congo-Brazzaville; DRC; Gabon; Burundi; Equatorial Guinea; São Tomé and Príncipe; France (2013–2021) EUFOR RCA (2014–2015): Estonia; Finland; Georgia; Latvia; Luxembourg; Netherlands; Portugal; Poland; Romania; Spain; Italy	Coalition of Patriots for Change (since 2020): Anti-balaka; FPRC; MPC elements (Note: Despite Mahamat al-Khatim's November 2023 announcement to leave CPC, some members of the group chose to stay in the coalition.); MPC; PRNC; CMSPR (since 2024) Support: Chad (alleged); RSF; Defunct groups: Séléka (2012–2014): CPJP; CPSK; UFDR; FDPC; FPR; RJ (2013–2018); MNLC (2017–2019); MLCJ (2008–2022); RPRC (2014–2022) UPC (2014–2025); 3R (2015–2025)	Ongoing: Séléka rebel coalition takes power from François Bozizé.; Michel Djotodia, the leader of Séléka, becomes president; President Michel Djotodia abolishes Séléka; Low-level fighting between Ex-Séléka factions and Anti-balaka militias.; President Michel Djotodia resigns amid heavy international pressure. Interim government is formed; Elections conducted in 2016 with Faustin-Archange Touadéra becoming the president; De facto split between ex-Séléka factions controlled north and east and Anti-balaka controlled south and west with a Séléka faction declaring the Republic of Logone.; Fighting between Ex-Séléka factions FPRC and UPC.; Ex-president Bozizé merges all rebel groups and forms the Coalition of Patriots for Change.; Elections in 2021 with Touadéra being re-elected as president.; As of July 2021 the government controls more territory than at any point since the war began.	Joseph Kabila
Kamwina Nsapu Rebellion (2016–c. 2019)	DR Congo; Allied militias: Bana Mura; Ecurie Mbembe; Smaller pro-government groups	Kamwina Nsapu rebels: Various independent militias	Government victory	Joseph Kabila

== Sources ==
- Plaut, Martin (2016). Understanding Eritrea: Inside Africa's Most Repressive State. Oxford: Oxford University Press. ISBN 978-0-19-066959-1.
- Prunier, Gérard (July 2004). "Rebel Movements and Proxy Warfare: Uganda, Sudan and the Congo (1986-99)". African Affairs. 103 (412): 359–383. doi:10.1093/afraf/adh050. JSTOR 3518562.
- Prunier, Gérard (2009). Africa's World War: Congo, the Rwandan Genocide, and the Making of a Continental Catastrophe. Oxford: Oxford University Press. ISBN 978-0-19-970583-2.
- Reyntjens, Filip (2009). The Great African War: Congo and Regional Geopolitics, 1996-2006. Cambridge University Press. ISBN 978-0-521-11128-7.
