= List of wars involving Angola =

The following is a list of wars involving Angola.

== List ==
Conflict	Combatant 1	Combatant 2	Result
Battle of Kombi (29 October 1647) (Part of the Dutch–Portuguese War)	Dutch Republic; Kingdom of Ndongo	Kingdom of Portugal	Ndongo-Matamba/Dutch allied victory
Battle of Mbwila (29 October 1665) (part of the Portuguese colonisation of Africa)	Kongo	Portugal	Portuguese victory
Battle of Mbidizi River (June 1670) (Part of the Kongo Civil War)	Soyo and Ngoyo	Portuguese Empire	Portuguese victory
Battle of Kitombo (18 October 1670) (Part of the Kongo Civil War)	Kongo states of Soyo and Ngoyo	Portuguese Empire: Portuguese West Africa	Soyo Victory
Battle of São Salvador (15 February 1709) (part of the Kongo Civil War)	Orthodox Catholics of Kingdom of Kongo	Antonian Catholics of Kingdom of Kongo	Orthodox victory
Battle of Quifangondo (10 November 1975) (part of the Angolan Civil War)	FNLA (ELNA); Zaire; South Africa	MPLA (FAPLA); Cuba	FAPLA victory
Angolan War of Independence (1961–1974) (part of the Portuguese Colonial War, the Decolonization of Africa and the Cold War)	MPLA; Material support: Soviet Union; Cuba; East Germany; Romania; Bulgaria; Yugoslavia; Tanzania; Libya; Brazil; FNLA; UNITA (until 1972); Material support: United States; China; Romania; Zaire; Israel; Bulgaria; Morocco; Brazil; Zambia; FLEC; RDL	Portugal; UNITA (after 1972); South Africa; Rhodesia	Angolan victory: Military stalemate; MPLA, FNLA, and UNITA political victory; Carnation Revolution; Alvor Agreement and Angolan independence in 1975; Start of the Angolan Civil War; Independence of Angola
Angolan Civil War (1975–2002) (part of the aftermath of the Angolan War of Independence, and the Cold War (until 1991)	People's Republic of Angola/Republic of Angola: MPLA; Cuba (1975–1989); SWAPO (1975–1989); ANC (1975–1989); Executive Outcomes (1993–1995); FLNC (1975–2001); Namibia (2001–2002) (Note: Irritated by UNITA cross-border raids, the Namibian Defence Force retaliated by sending units into southern Angola and destroying a UNITA training camp at Licua in late January 2001. The Namibian troops were not withdrawn from Angola until May 2002.) Military advisers and pilots: Soviet Union (1975–1989); East Germany (1975–1989); North Korea (1980s) (Note: The North Korean Military Mission in Angola had about 1,500 personnel attached to FAPLA in 1986, most likely advisers, although their exact duties are uncertain. Their presence in Angola may have been indirectly subsidised by the Soviet Union. Up to 3,000 North Korean military personnel served in Angola throughout the 1980s.)	Democratic People's Republic of Angola: UNITA; FNLA (1975–1976); FNLA (1976–1978); South Africa (1975–1989); Zaire (1975) FLEC	MPLA victory: Withdrawal of all foreign forces in 1989.; Transition towards a multiparty political system in 1991/92.; Dissolution of the armed forces of the FNLA.; Participation of UNITA and FNLA, as political parties, in the new political system, from 1991/92 onwards.; Jonas Savimbi, leader of UNITA, killed in 2002; UNITA abandoned armed struggle and participated in electoral politics.; Resistance of FLEC continued to this day
Cabinda War (1975–) (part of the Angolan Civil War (until 2002)	Angola Cuba (until 1991) Democratic People's Republic of Angola (1991): UNITA (joint operations, 1991); Military advisers and pilots: East Germany (until 1989); Soviet Union (until 1989)	FLEC: FLEC-FAC; Communist Committee of Cabinda; Republic of Cabinda (1975–1976, 1999); Zaire (1975)	Ongoing: Ceasefire declared by FLEC-Renovada in August 2006; Ongoing guerrilla warfare by FLEC-FAC; Unilateral ceasefire declared by Cabindan militias on 30 March 2020 to address the COVID-19 pandemic
Battle of Cassinga (4 May 1978) (part of the South African Border War)	South Africa	SWAPO; Cuba	South African victory
Battle of Cuito Cuanavale (14 August 1987 – 23 March 1988) (part of the Angolan Civil War and the South African Border War)	National Union for the Total Independence of Angola (UNITA): Armed Forces for the Liberation of Angola (FALA); South Africa: South African Defence Force; South West African Territorial Force (SWATF)	People's Republic of Angola: People's Armed Forces of Liberation of Angola (FAPLA); Cuba: Cuban Revolutionary Armed Forces (FAR); South West African People's Organisation: People's Liberation Army of Namibia (PLAN); African National Congress: Umkhonto we Sizwe (MK); Military advisors: Soviet Union; East Germany; North Korea; Vietnam	Inconclusive: South Africa and UNITA defeat a major FAPLA offensive towards Mavinga, inflicting heavy casualties on FAPLA and preserving UNITA's control of southern Angola.; Remaining FAPLA units repel several South African and UNITA attacks near the Tumpo River.; Withdrawal over several months of most South African and UNITA troops from Cuito Cuanavale under Operation Displace; Round One of Tripartite Accord talks commences
First Congo War (1996–1997) (part of the Congolese Civil Wars, aftermath of the Rwandan genocide, spillovers of the Burundian Civil War, the Second Sudanese Civil War and the Angolan Civil War)	(Democratic Republic of the Congo) AFDL; Rwanda; Uganda; Burundi; Angola (South Sudan) SPLA; Eritrea; Supported by: South Africa; Zambia; Zimbabwe; Ethiopia; Tanzania; United States (covertly) Mai-Mai (Note: Many Mai-Mai militias in eastern Zaire initially allied themselves with Rwanda and the AFDL against Hutu militants and refugees. As soon as most Hutu were driven away, however, many Mai-Mai groups turned against Rwanda and the AFDL. Despite this, some anti-Hutu Mai-Mai remained allied with Rwanda and the AFDL.)	Zaire: FAZ; White Legion; Sudan; Chad (Rwanda) Ex-FAR/ALiR; Interahamwe; CNDD-FDD; UNITA; ADF; FLNC; Supported by: France; Central African Republic; China; Israel; Kuwait (denied) Mai-Mai	AFDL victory: Overthrow of the Mobutu regime; Zaire renamed back to the Democratic Republic of the Congo; Installation of Laurent-Désiré Kabila as president; Beginning of Second Congo War
Congo-Brazzaville Civil War (1997–1999) (part of the aftermaths of the First Congo War and Rwandan genocide)	Armed Forces of the Republic of the Congo (from October 1997); Cobra Militia (Rwanda) Rwandan Hutu Militia; Angola; Chad	Armed Forces of the Republic of the Congo (to October 1997); Cocoye Militia; Ninja Militia; Nsiloulou; Supported by: Jonas Savimbi; FLEC; Supported by: Democratic Republic of the Congo	Nguesso loyalist victory: Denis Sassou Nguesso returns to power
Second Congo War (1998–2003) (part of the Congolese Civil Wars and the aftermath of the First Congo War and the Angolan Civil War)	Pro-government: DR Congo; Angola; Chad; Namibia; Zimbabwe; Sudan (alleged); Anti-Ugandan forces: LRA; ADF; UNRF II; FNI; Anti-Rwandan militias: FDLR; (Rwanda) ALiR; Interahamwe; RDR; Mai-Mai; Other Hutu-aligned forces; Anti-Burundi militias: CNDD-FDD; FROLINA	Rwandan-aligned militias: RCD; RCD-Goma; Banyamulenge; Ugandan-aligned militias: MLC; Forces for Renewal; UPC; Other Tutsi-aligned forces; Anti-Angolan forces: UNITA; Foreign state actors: Uganda; Rwanda; Burundi; Libya (alleged)	Military stalemate: Assassination of Laurent-Désiré Kabila; Sun City Agreement; Creation of a unified, multi-party government in DR Congo, with Joseph Kabila as president; Pretoria Accord; Rwandan withdrawal from DR Congo in exchange for commitment towards the disarmament of Hutu militias.; The Transitional Government of the Democratic Republic of the Congo is established, deployment of MONUC.; End of the Angolan Civil War.; Continuation of the Ituri conflict.; Start of the Kivu conflict.
Kivu Conflict (2004-) (part of the aftermath of the Second Congo War, War against the Islamic State)	Pro-government: DR Congo; (Democratic Republic of the Congo) Wazalendo (March 2024–); NDC-R; Burundi; (United Nations) MONUSCO; Angola; Zimbabwe; Botswana (against FNL and FNL–Nzabampema); Supported by: France; Belgium; Bulgaria; Horațiu Potra's Mercenary Legion (until 31 Jan 2025)	Rwandan-aligned militias: CNDP; M23; Banyamulenge; Twigwaneho; Gumino; Ugandan-aligned militias: FPRI; FPLC; FPDC; Foreign state actors: Uganda; Rwanda; Anti-Ugandan forces: IS-CAP; ADF-Baluku; ADF-Mukulu; Mai-Mai Kyandenga; UPLC; Anti-Rwandan militias: FDLR; RUD-Urunana; Other Hutu-aligned forces; Nyatura; Anti-Burundi militias: RED-Tabara; FNL; Mai-Mai militias: NDC-R (until March 2024); FPP-AP; AFRC; RNL; Mazembe; Kifuafua; Simba; MAC; Raia Mutomboki; Buhirwa; Kidjangala; Fuliru Mai-Mai; Makanaki; Biloze Bishambuke; CNPSC; Alaise; CODECO (in Ituri); Chini ya Kilima–FPIC (in Ituri); (Zaire) Zaïre-FPAC (in Ituri)	Ongoing: FARDC victory against the CNDP in 2009 and the M23 movement in 2012; CNDP becomes a political party in the DRC; M23 movement signs peace agreement with the DRC government; renews fighting in 2022; Conflict breaks out between Rwanda and the Congo in 2022; FDLR, Mai-Mai militias and other armed groups still active in Eastern DRC; UN and FARDC begin operation to defeat the FDLR and their allies at the start of 2015
Central African Republic Civil War (2013–)	Central African Republic; Central African Armed Forces; MINUSCA (since 2014) Rwanda (since 2020); Russia (since 2018); Wagner Group; Russian Imperial Movement; Black Russians; Azande Ani Kpi Gbe; Formerly: South Africa (2013); MISCA (2013–2014) MICOPAX (2008–2013): Angola; Cameroon; Chad; Morocco; Uganda; Congo-Brazzaville; DRC; Gabon; Burundi; Equatorial Guinea; São Tomé and Príncipe; France (2013–2021) EUFOR RCA (2014–2015): Estonia; Finland; Georgia; Latvia; Luxembourg; Netherlands; Portugal; Poland; Romania; Spain; Italy	Coalition of Patriots for Change (since 2020): Anti-balaka; 3R; UPC; FPRC; MPC; PRNC; CMSPR (since 2024) Support: Chad (alleged); RSF; Defunct groups: Séléka (2012–2014): CPJP; CPSK; UFDR; FDPC; FPR; RJ (2013–2018); MNLC (2017–2019); MLCJ (2008–2022); RPRC (2014–2022)	Ongoing: Séléka rebel coalition takes power from François Bozizé.; Michel Djotodia, the leader of Séléka, becomes president; President Michel Djotodia abolishes Séléka; Low-level fighting between Ex-Séléka factions and Anti-balaka militias.; President Michel Djotodia resigns amid heavy international pressure. Interim government is formed; Elections conducted in 2016 with Faustin-Archange Touadéra becoming the president; De facto split between ex-Séléka factions controlled north and east and Anti-balaka controlled south and west with a Séléka faction declaring the Republic of Logone.; Fighting between Ex-Séléka factions FPRC and UPC.; Ex-president Bozizé merges all rebel groups and forms the Coalition of Patriots for Change.; Elections in 2021 with Touadéra being re-elected as president.; As of July 2021 the government controls more territory than at any point since the war began.

== Sources ==
- Plaut, Martin (2016). Understanding Eritrea: Inside Africa's Most Repressive State. Oxford: Oxford University Press. ISBN 978-0-19-066959-1.
- Prunier, Gérard (July 2004). "Rebel Movements and Proxy Warfare: Uganda, Sudan and the Congo (1986-99)". African Affairs. 103 (412): 359–383. doi:10.1093/afraf/adh050. JSTOR 3518562.
- Prunier, Gérard (2009). Africa's World War: Congo, the Rwandan Genocide, and the Making of a Continental Catastrophe. Oxford: Oxford University Press. ISBN 978-0-19-970583-2.
- Reyntjens, Filip (2009). The Great African War: Congo and Regional Geopolitics, 1996-2006. Cambridge University Press. ISBN 978-0-521-11128-7.
