= 2025 Walikale offensive =

M23 campaign in western North Kivu, DR Congo

- Part of the M23 campaign
| Date | 6 March – 19 March (1 week and 6 days) |
| Location | North Kivu, Democratic Republic of the Congo |
| Result | M23 victory: M23 rebels capture Walikale and surrounding villages; M23 rejects ceasefire offers |

Belligerents
| Congo River Alliance; March 23 Movement; Rwanda (rejected by Rwanda) | DR Congo; (Democratic Republic of the Congo) Wazalendo |

Commanders and leaders
| Corneille Nangaa; Sultani Makenga; Joseph Bahati Musanga | (Democratic Republic of the Congo) Felix Tshisekedi (Democratic Republic of the Congo) Evariste Somo Kakule |

Units involved
| M23 forces | FARDC; Wazalendo militias |

Strength
| Unknown | Unknown |

Casualties and losses
| Unknown | Unknown |

The 2025 Walikale offensive was a military operation conducted by March 23 Movement (M23), a Rwandan-backed rebel group in the eastern Democratic Republic of the Congo, centering on the North Kivu settlement of Walikale. M23 rebels advanced further westwards from their earlier Goma and Bukavu offensives. On 19 March 2025, the rebel forces captured Walikale marking their furthest western advance in their 2025 campaign. This mineral-rich town, situated approximately 130 kilometers northwest of the provincial capital Goma, has strategic and economic significance due to its proximity to valuable tin mining operations.

== Background ==
Walikale is a town situated in the western part of North Kivu Province in the eastern Democratic Republic of the Congo. Known for its strategic location and natural resources, Walikale has been a focal point in the region's history of armed conflicts. The area has witnessed a series of military confrontations, involving various militias, such as the National Congress for the Defence of the People (CNDP), M23, Raïa Mutomboki, Mai-Mai Nyatura, the Democratic Forces for the Liberation of Rwanda (FDLR), and the Alliance of Patriots for a Free and Sovereign Congo (APLCS).

Walikale is rich in mineral resources, including tin, gold, wolframite, coltan, and rare earth elements such as monazite. The area is also home to colored stones, including amethyst, tourmaline, and corundum. The region's mineral wealth and fertile lands have made it a highly contested area, and its strategic importance has been amplified by the ongoing conflict. Between 2021 and 2024, M23 expanded its influence across North Kivu, controlling five of the province's six territories: Rutshuru, Nyiragongo, Beni, Masisi, and Walikale. In November 2024, the situation in Walikale remained uncertain, particularly in the village of Pinga, which became a battleground between M23 rebels and the Armed Forces of the Democratic Republic of the Congo (FARDC), supported by Congolese self-defense forces and the irregular militia known as Wazalendo. M23's offensives in Walikale were driven by the intent to control the region's mineral resources.

A United Nations expert report stated that between 3,000 and 4,000 Rwandan soldiers were present on Congolese territory to support M23, which itself had approximately 3,000 fighters. In April 2024, M23 encircled Sake, a critical transport hub located 23 kilometers (14 miles) from Goma. The rebels also seized Rubaya, a town central to coltan mining, a mineral essential for electronics and energy transition technologies. Following the capture of parts of Rutshuru and Masisi territories, M23 advanced towards Walikale. Despite a ceasefire agreement mediated by Angola in July 2024, the rebels resumed hostilities on 20 October, briefly occupying Kalembe in Walikale Territory before being repelled by Wazalendo and the Nduma Defense of Congo-Renovated. The UN estimated that M23 generated approximately $300,000 (€280,000) per month through taxation on coltan production in Masisi and Rutshuru.

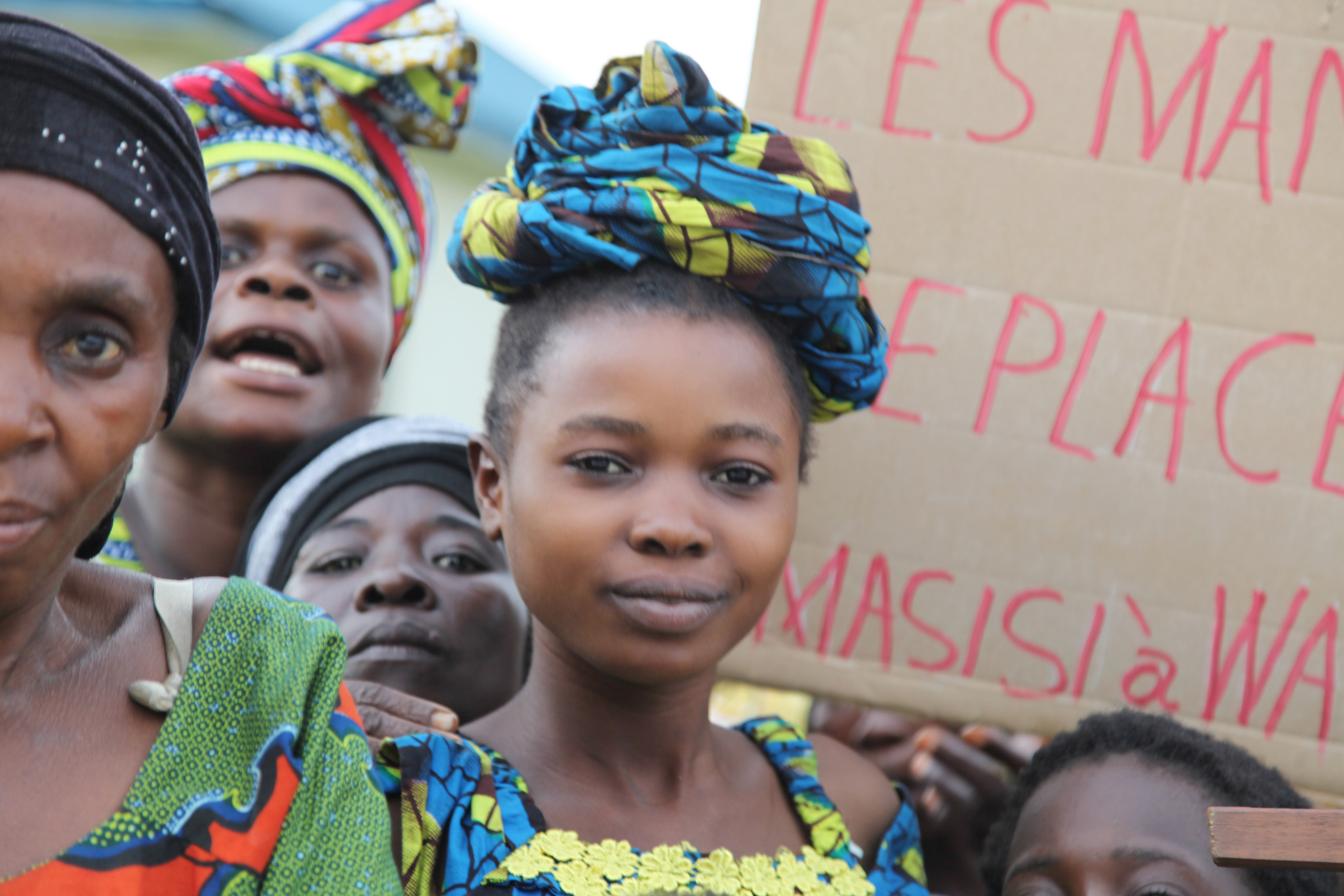
Women and young girl in Walikale

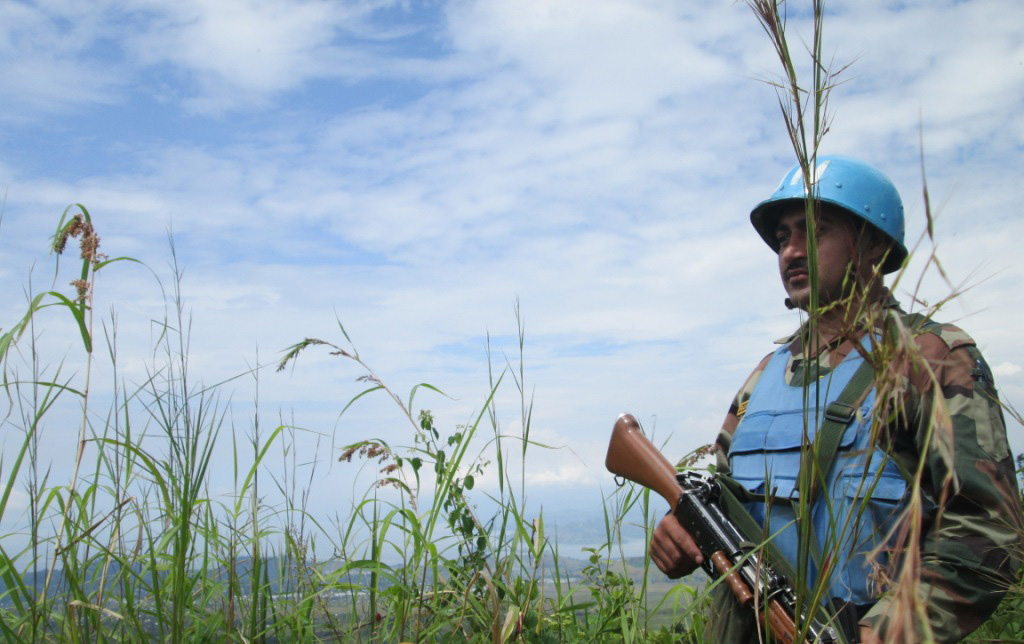
A MONUSCO Indian peacekeeper stationed at a lookout post in Walikale

In early 2025, M23 continued its military campaigns, capturing significant cities, including Goma on 28 January and Bukavu, the capital of South Kivu, on 15 February. On 11 March, Angola announced direct negotiations between M23 and Congolese government scheduled for 18 March in Luanda. This announcement followed a visit by Congolese President Félix Tshisekedi to Luanda. While Kinshasa acknowledged the decision, it emphasized the necessity of aligning with United Nations Security Council Resolution 2773, which calls for the withdrawal of rebel and Rwandan forces from occupied areas. On 15 March, Angolan President João Lourenço called for a ceasefire effective from midnight on 16 March, which included halting attacks on civilians and territorial advances. The goal was to create the conditions for peace talks in Luanda between the Congolese government and M23. However, M23 forces ignored the ceasefire and occupied Ntea village in the Ihana groupement, located in Walikale Territory. On 16 March, M23 forces captured Kibua, located more than 80 km from Walikale, in defiance of the ceasefire agreement.

The international community responded to the escalating conflict, with the European Union imposing targeted sanctions on Rwandan officials and M23 leaders on 17 March. Among those sanctioned were RDF (Rwandan Defense Forces) officers, including Ruki Karusisi, commander of special forces in eastern DRC; Eugène Nkubito, commander of the 3rd Division in North Kivu; and Pascal Muhizi, commander of the 2nd Division in eastern DRC since 2023. M23 rebels targeted by sanctions included leader Bertrand Bisimwa, recruitment head Désiré Rukomera, Colonel John Imani Nzenze, deputy finance chief Jean-Bosco Nzabonimpa Mupenzi, and finance leader-turned-North Kivu governor Jean Bahati Musanga. The EU also listed Francis Kamanzi, CEO of the Rwanda Mines, Petroleum and Gas Board, for his involvement in the exploitation of conflict minerals and his role in the illegal importation of gold from M23-controlled areas.

On 18 March 2025, DRC President Félix Tshisekedi and Rwandan President Paul Kagame held their first direct meeting since the escalation of M23's offensive in January 2025. The summit, hosted in Qatar, resulted in a joint statement calling for an "immediate and unconditional" ceasefire. However, on the same day, planned peace negotiations between the M23 rebel group and the Congolese government in Luanda were derailed when the rebels withdrew from talks. Rebel spokesperson Lawrence Kanyuka stated that the withdrawal was due to interference from Western nations, particularly the European Union, and other unspecified international organizations. The M23 accused these external parties of deliberately sabotaging peace initiatives in the DRC and undermining the negotiations process. Despite this, a Congolese delegation had already arrived in Luanda for the talks.

== Offensive ==
=== FARDC clashes ===
On 6 March, the Armed Forces of the Democratic Republic of the Congo and allied militias attacked several villages close to Masisi, attempting to recapture the capital and prevent westward advances of M23 forces.

=== M23 western advance ===
On 9 March, M23 rebels launched a counter-attack on FARDC forces and allied militia positions close to Masisi. M23 forces captured Nyabiondo and neighboring villages along Route Provinciale 529 (RP529).

On 11 March, M23 engaged in clashes against FARDC forces and Wazalendo forces in Lwibo, located about 8 kilometres (5.0 mi) north of Nyabiondo. The following day, M23 captured Kashebere in Masisi Territory and continued their advance, seizing Kibati in Walikale Territory and establishing new positions along a western axis of advance. In reaction to this escalation, FARDC and Wazalendo established defensive positions in Kibua, situated about 24 kilometers west of Kibati, to fortify their line of defense. M23 rebels also captured Muheto and surrounding villages in subsequent combat operations against FARDC and Wazalendo.

=== FARDC counter-attack ===
On 13 March, according to reports from multiple Congolese media sources, FARDC and Wazalendo advanced approximately 15 miles eastward RP529. This offensive resulted in the partial recapture of Kibati village following direct combat engagement with M23 forces. Concurrent with the eastward push along RP529, FARDC and Wazalendo forces positioned in Pinga, a settlement approximately 60 kilometres (37 mi) north of RP529, executed a coordinated flank attack against M23 positions near Nyabiondo. This maneuver opened a second front against the rebel forces, potentially disrupting their supply lines and forcing them to divide their attention and resources.

Despite initial successes in reclaiming territory, reports from Tazama RDC highlighted significant logistical challenges faced by Wazalendo forces, who were isolated from reinforcements and supply chains. As a result, there were concerns that the recaptured territory would not be held for long. On 14 March, amid rising tensions in Walikale, Alphamin Bisie Mining (ABM), the largest tin producer in the DRC, which is located 180 kilometers northwest of Goma and 32 kilometers from the Walikale-Kisangani road, suspended operations due to the escalating conflict. On 15 March, Angolan President João Lourenço called for a ceasefire to begin at midnight on 16 March, urging both sides to end attacks on civilians and territorial advances in order to facilitate peace talks in Luanda between the Congolese government and M23. However, M23 and Congo River Alliance (AFC) forces continued their operations, capturing Ntea village in the Ihana groupement of Walikale Territory. On 16 March, M23 and AFC forces captured Kibua, situated over 80 kilometers from Walikale, in defiance of the ceasefire call.

On 17 March, FARDC and Wazalendo successfully halted the M23 advance toward Walikale, pushing the rebel forces back approximately 19 miles from Mutakato to Mpofi, a village about 52 kilometers from Walikale along RP529. This counter-offensive reclaimed territory previously captured by M23 forces on 16 March. To reinforce their defensive positions, FARDC deployed additional troops to Mutakato from Bunia, the capital of Ituri Province, located approximately 650 kilometers north of Walikale. These reinforcements arrived on 17 March.

=== M23 renewed advance ===
The conflict intensified on 18 March, with reports from Congolese media indicating that FARDC and Wazalendo engaged M23 forces in combat operations across Mpofi town and surrounding villages. During these clashes, M23 reportedly reinforced its offensive positions in Mpofi with fighters from Kibua, a village located 32 kilometres (20 mi) to the east.

M23 simultaneously consolidated control around surrounding villages of Masisi. After two consecutive days of fighting against pro-government militias on March 17–18, M23 captured the settlements of Kahanga and Miandja, located approximately 16 kilometres (9.9 mi) north of Masisi. Congolese media characterized this area as having previously served as a "stronghold" for "Nyatura, FDLR, and APLCS".

=== Capture of Walikale ===
Residents of Walikale reported that M23 forces entered the outskirts of the town on the evening on 19 March 2025, with gunfire heard from the vicinity of the Nyabangi neighborhood. According to an anonymous army source, the rebels launched a surprise attack, overwhelming a Congolese military position outside the town before engaging in combat with Congolese soldiers and Wazalendo.

The capture of the town of approximately 15,000 inhabitants represented the furthest westward advance by M23 in their 2025 offensive to date, with troops moving about 125 kilometres (78 mi) northwest of Goma. Walikale's capture placed the rebel forces within 400 kilometres (250 mi) of Kisangani, the country's fourth-largest urban center.

=== M23 withdrawal ===
On 22 March, M23 and AFC declared their withdrawal from Walikale and nearby areas, three days after seizing control. They cited efforts to "promote conditions for peace initiatives and political dialogue".
