= Second Battle of Kitshanga =

Battle between M23 and Wazalendo fighters

- Part of M23 offensive
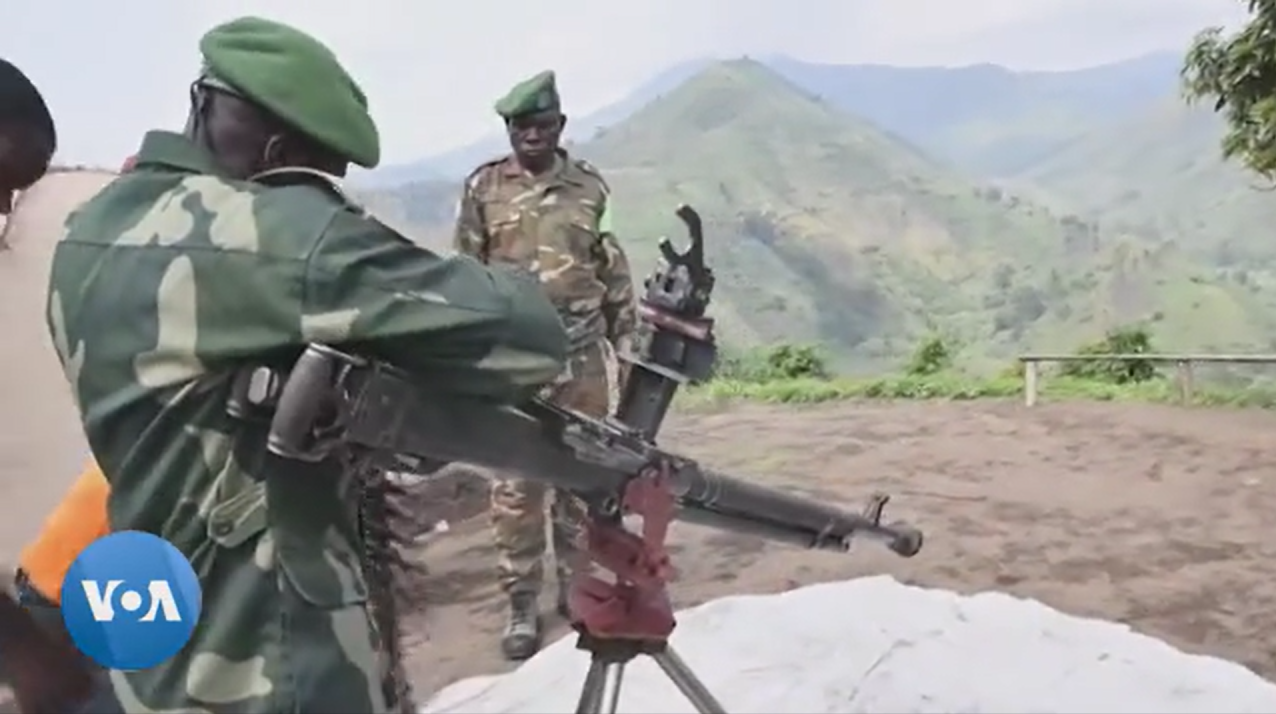
- Wazalendo fighters in Kitshanga during Wazalendo's capture of the city
Date	1st phase: October 1–9, 2023; 2nd phase: October 16–21, 2023
Location	Kitchanga, Nord-Kivu Democratic Republic of the Congo
Result	1st phase: Wazalendo victory 2nd phase: M23 victory

Belligerents
Wazalendo: APCLS; NDC-R; CMC; MPA; White FARDC instructors	March 23 Movement

Commanders and leaders
Ngowa Luwanda	Unknown

Casualties and losses
- 20+ killed, 30+ injured (1st battle); 5+ injured (2nd battle); 84,700 displaced

The Second Battle of Kitshanga broke out between Rwandan-backed M23 fighters and irregular groups known as Wazalendo allied with the Congolese government. In January 2023, M23 rebels captured Kitshanga from the Congolese Army and allied forces in their renewed offensive in North Kivu. Wazalendo forces captured Kitshanga in early October 2023 as part of a counteroffensive, with the city switching hands between Wazalendo and the M23 after October 16, and a second M23 offensive on October 21 capturing the town.

== Prelude ==
In January 2023, as part of their larger offensive against the Congolese government, Rwandan-backed M23 rebels attacked and captured the city of Kitchanga, which was defended at the time by Congolese army, self-defense militias, and Nduma Defense of Congo-Renovated (NDC-R) fighters. Following the M23's capture of the city, 20% of the population left. In May 2023, a refugee camp near Kitshanga was attacked by the rebel group CPC-Nyatura, killing thirteen civilians. Just before the fighting in October, Kitshanga was controlled by the East African Force, a multinational neutral coalition of East African countries.

Wazalendo was created by the FARDC in May 2023 as a coalition of pro-government (or largely anti-M23) rebel groups in North Kivu, and consisted of the Alliance of Patriots for a Free and Sovereign Congo (APCLS), Nduma Defense of Congo-Renovated (NDC-R), the Collective of Movements for Change (CMC), Patriotic Self-Defense Movement (MPA), and different Nyatura groups. Colonel Ngowa Luwanda of the APCLS was the self-described leader of the Wazalendo in the Kitshanga area.

== Battle ==
Clashes broke out on October 1, but little is known about what occurred. On October 3, in the hills surrounding Burungu, Rushebeshe, and other towns near Kitshanga, M23 attempted to recapture positions they had lost days prior. In these attacks, Wazalendo was able to push out the M23 fighters. Wazalendo fighters stormed the city of Kitshanga on October 6, while clashes continued in the village of Burungu. Twenty civilians were killed in the battles between October 3 and 6, and as Wazalendo captured the city, 80,000 people fled the fighting. Residents of the city stated that Wazalendo fighters stole from civilians while they stormed the city.

M23 launched a counteroffensive on the city on October 7, after regaining positions in the mountains around the city. Wazalendo fighters fled quickly, apparently running out of ammunition. Residents described the situation as "shooting everywhere". Clashes continued on the outskirts of Kitshanga on October 9. The M23 accused the Burundian Army of aiding Wazalendo in the battle, part of a larger campaign against the Burundian government by Rwandan and pro-Rwandan media, and the Burundian government denied involvement. M23 reportedly captured the city of Kitshanga and held it for under 24 hours, before Wazalendo and FARDC forces fully captured it.

Fighting continued sporadically on the outskirts of Kitshanga after the initial capture of the city, although the city itself was largely peaceful. Markets reopened in the city by October 16. Reporters in Kitshanga during control by Wazalendo and the FARDC reported the existence of white instructors within the FARDC that Congolese authorities insisted they not photograph. M23 launched a second counteroffensive on October 21, capturing the city with little pushback from Wazalendo. The counteroffensive began in the nearby village of Bwiza, and quickly made its way to central Kitshanga. At least five civilians outside the MONUSCO base were injured in the second attack by M23. M23 was still in control of the city by November 21.

== Impact ==
84,700 people fled their homes because of the fighting. Two thousand civilians sought refuge in the MONUSCO base in Kitshanga, and 18,000 others sought refuge outside of it.

== Aftermath ==
On November 21, Toby Kahangi, the leader of Kitshanga Civil Society, stated that M23 was in control of Kitshanga and that Wazalendo had lost support within the city's population.
