= 2014 North Kivu offensive =

- Part of Kivu conflict
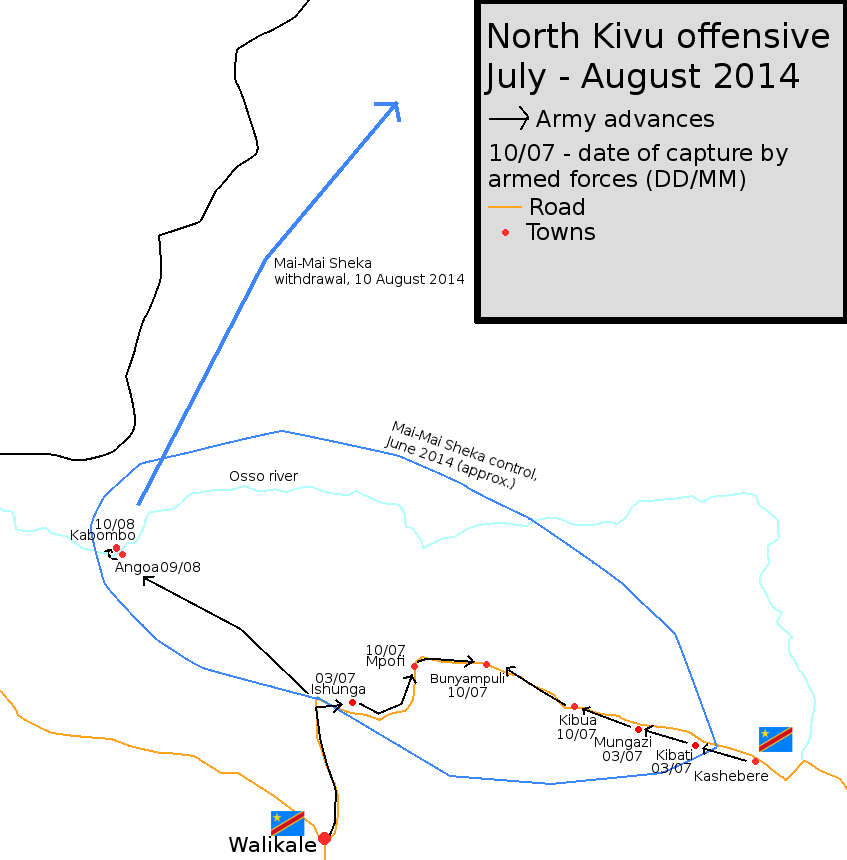
- Map of offensive
Date	30 June/2 July – 10 August 2014
Location	Masisi and Walikale Territories, North Kivu province
Result	Congolese and UN victory
Territorial changes	Walikale–Masisi road liberated from rebel control

Belligerents
Democratic Republic of the Congo (United Nations) MONUSCO	Alliance of Patriots for a Free and Sovereign Congo (APCLS); Mai-Mai Sheka (NDC)

Commanders and leaders
(United Nations) Felix Basse	Janvier Kaheribi

Strength
Unknown	Unknown

Casualties and losses
Unknown	23 surrendered
- 20,000 people displaced

On 30 June or 2 July 2014, the Armed Forces of the Democratic Republic of the Congo and United Nations forces launched an offensive against rebel groups in the Masisi and Walikale territories, part of the North Kivu province, in the eastern Democratic Republic of the Congo (DRC).

== Offensive ==
The operation was launched simultaneously from Walikale and Kashebere towards Kibua. By 3 July armed forces have already liberated Mungazi, Kibati and Ishunga in Luberi territory. On 10 July army reported that Kibua and Bunyampuli have been recaptured. On 28 July MONUSCO spokesman claimed that army controlled Hihama and Utunda areas and mining area of Angoa. On 4 August militiamen returned to the region following withdrawal of armed forces. On 8 August armed forces again launched offensive clashing with NDC in Angoa and Kabombo. On 9 August armed forces captured Angowa on Walikale-Kisangani road. On 10 August armed forces recaptured Kabombo. NDC militiamen have withdrawn north of Osso river towards Lubero territory. Operation resulted in liberation of the Kashebere-Mpofi-Walikale axis including former stronghold of Buniyampuli and the Kibua-Pinga axis. 23 Mai-Mai Sheka fighters surrendered.
