= CNRD =

CNRD may refer to:

- National Council for Renewal and Democracy (French: Conseil National pour le Renouveau et la Démocratie), a Rwandan political party
- National Committee of Reconciliation and Development (French: Comité national du rassemblement et du développement), the ruling junta of Guinea
