= Angoa =

- Town
- Location within Democratic Republic of the Congo
- Coordinates: 1.025099°S 27.798333°E
- Country: Democratic Republic of the Congo
- Province: North Kivu
- Territory: Walikale Territory
- Time zone: UTC+02:00 (CAT)

Angoa is a village located in the Democratic Republic of the Congo province of North Kivu, gold and cassiterite mining is active near it.

== History ==
Since 2009 the village had been under the control of Nduma Defense of Congo (NDC). On 3 September 2012 clahses were reported at Angoa site between NDC and FARDC, resulting in one civilian killed and another injured. On 24 December FDLR reportedly looted Angoa site, taking with them goods and kidnapping 15 people. FDLR released them once they returned to the forest. Between 8 and 10 September 2013, according to a news report, Maï Maï Simba rebels abducted and killed at least eight people at Angoa site, including miners, farmers, and merchants. On 9 August 2014 Angoa was captured by armed forces during the 2014 North Kivu offensive. As of June 2025 the site is occupied by Wazalendo and Congolese army.
