= Jean-Marie Higiro =

Rwandan academic

Jean-Marie Vianney Higiro (born c. 1945) was the Director of the Rwandan Information Office (ORINFOR), a government corporation that ran Radio Rwanda, Rwandan Television and state controlled media in the Republic of Rwanda.

== Early life ==
Higiro was born in Rwanda under Belgian rule in 1945. He matriculated at the National University of Rwanda. Later, he studied abroad in North America, graduating with a Ph.D. in Radio-Television-Film from the University of Texas at Austin.

== Rwandan Civil War ==
On July 31, 1993, Higiro was appointed director of the Rwandan Information Office by the coalition government led by Prime Minister Agathe Uwilingiyimana. He left Kigali on April 9 and arrived in Nairobi on April 10, 1994, during a US embassy evacuation. He left Nairobi for the United States on July 19, 1994, the day he was supposed to be sworn in as minister of information in the RPF led government headed by Faustin Twagiramungu.

During the Civil war Higiro was targeted for his "moderate beliefs" and his enemies plotted to murder him. He ended up escaping with his immediate family.

== Post Civil War ==
Higiro settled in Massachusetts and became a communications professor at Western New England University, in Springfield, Massachusetts.

In February 2008, The Washington Post reported that current Rwandan authorities had requested that the United States arrest Higiro and accused him of providing financial support of ethnic Rwandan rebel fighters in eastern Congo. According to the report, Higiro acknowledges supporting a group called the "Rally for Unity and Democracy," what the report characterized as 'a political and military organization aimed at opening up political space in Rwanda and peacefully removing what [Higiro] called "the dictatorial government" of President Paul Kagame.'
