= Paul Sadala =

Congolese militant (died 2014)

Paul Sadala (died April 2014), alias "Morgan", was a Congolese militant, poacher and faction leader from the Mai-Mai Simba. Throughout the 2000s, Sadala grew into an elephant poaching kingpin in northeastern Congo, particularly in and around the Okapi Wildlife Reserve. He was arrested on at least two occasions by ICCN park rangers. In 2011, styled Morgan, he initiated the militant group "Mai Mai Lumumba" while it was commonly known as "Mai Mai Morgan". Morgan and his rebels were accused of committing the most severe crimes, such as cannibalism, rape, kidnapping and murder. Their most high-profile attacks included a siege of Epulu village, the headquarters of the Okapi Wildlife Reserve early on the morning of June 24, 2012. Morgan occupied Epulu until the afternoon of June 25, 2012 before vanishing back into the forest. In the wake of this attack, 7 people were killed, while the entire captive population of okapi in Epulu's breeding center were also shot and killed by the rebels. FARDC soldiers arrived and looted the village. Morgan enjoyed support from FARDC units in Bafwasende and Kisangani In January 2013, Morgan occupied the large town of Mambasa for several hours before finally being repelled by the Congolese army.

Morgan and his poaching and rebellious associates fought a bloody war, which focused mostly on occupying territory in the Ituri forest. On April 12, 2014, Morgan turned himself in to a local chief at Badengaido claiming that his followers and wives were suffering in the forest. While FARDC forces arranged for his extradition to Bunia, a gun battle erupted on April 14, 2014, the events of which are not well understood. The Congolese army were attacked with armed weapons, and as he was escaping from the gun battle, Morgan was shot in the legs and died from blood loss. The Congolese government continues to pursue loyalists to this faction, which is led by a Mbuti pygmy named Manu, and would turn themselves in after the death of Morgan.
