= Mai-Mai Kyandenga =

Congolese rebel group

- Leader: Kyandenga
- Founded: 2016
- Dates active: 2016–2017; 2019–present
- Split from: ULPC
- Country: Democratic Republic of the Congo
- Active regions: North Kivu, Ituri
- Size: 300 (2017)
- Part of: ULPC (2016–?)

Mai-Mai Kyandenga is a Mai-Mai armed group operating in north-eastern Democratic Republic of the Congo. It claims to protect the local population of Beni Territory and their land. It still remains unclear what the actual goal of the group is and how much it has in connection with the Union of Patriots for the Liberation of Congo (ULPC), Allied Democratic Forces (ADF), and other Mai-Mai groups operating in the area.

== Background ==
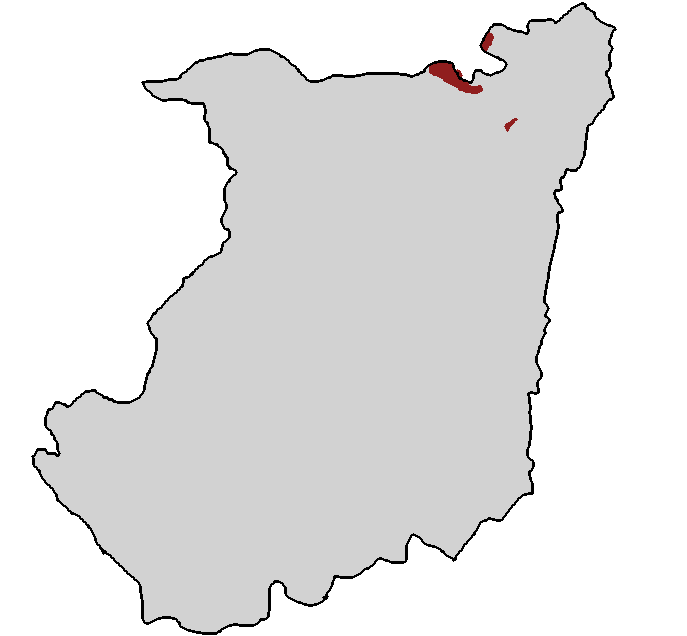
Area of operations of Mai-Mai Kyandenga within North Kivu in October 2017

In 2002, the now leader of the group and former fisherman, Kyandenga, reportedly gained customary powers after reeling in a package that contained a flower, a diamond, a stick, a dollar bill, a bible, and a Koran. This gave him the attention of various armed group commanders and chiefs, including Fabien Mudoghu. Later on with the help of an acquaintance by name of Kilalo Katembo, now leader of the ULPC, he became a traditional doctor with the Mai-Mai Simba branch of Paul Sadala (Also known as Morgan). In 2011, he joined the armed group of FOLC in Beni Territory.

In 2016, Kilalo left Mai-Mai Simba in Ituri and went back to the city of Butembo. There he would create his own Mai-Mai group called ULPC. Kyandenga would soon join him and be tasked with developing a ULPC faction near Beni.

== History ==
Now in charge of his own group he collaborated with a priest known as Bernard west of Mbau where he recruited local youth.

After this Mai-Mai Kyandenga would operate throughout 2016 and most of 2017 before going dormant for about a year. During that time Kyandenga would have been captured by government forces and sent to a military dungeon in Beni. On November 3, 2018, ULPC troops attacked that very dungeon and broke out Kyandenga along with forces from the ADF and ULPC.

On 5 October, 2020, the ADF along with the Mai-Mai Kyandenga attacked the FARDC in Mamove locality, Beni Territory. This marked the first time ADF and Mai-Mai Kyandenga troops worked together.

In September 2022, FARDC forces captured Kyandenga (full name: Jean-Baptiste Kambale Paluku), along with 10 members of the Mai-Mai. However, clashes between FARDC and the Mai-Mai continued through November 2022. In February 2024, FARDC captured the new leader of Mai-Mai Kyandenga, Kambale Matabishi.
