= Nduma Defense of Congo =

Rebel group based in the eastern Democratic Republic of the Congo

- Nduma défense du Congo
- Other name: Mai-Mai Sheka
- Leaders: Ntabo Ntaberi Sheka (2009-2017); Mandaima (2017-present)
- Founded: 2009
- Country: Democratic Republic of the Congo
- Headquarters: Pinga (November 2012 – November 2013); Buniyampuli (until July 2014)
- Active regions: North Kivu

The Nduma Defense of Congo (French: Nduma défense du Congo or NDC, also known as Mai-Mai Sheka) is a rebel group based in the eastern Democratic Republic of the Congo. It is one of the various Mai-Mai rebel militias that were formed ostensibly to defend villages from attacks from Rwandan forces and Rwandan-backed rebel groups. However, the NDC have been accused of sexual violence, looting, and fighting all sides including fellow militias, the Congolese military, and the United Nations.

The NDC was formed in 2009 by former minerals trader Ntabo Ntaberi Sheka, an ethnic Nyanga. Sheka claims the group was formed to liberate the mines of Walikale Territory in North Kivu.

According to the United Nations, Sheka commanded a mass rape of at least 387 women, men, and children over a three-day span in Walikale in 2010. This was said to be a punishment for the villagers collaborating with the Congolese government forces. In 2011, Sheka was added to a United Nations Security Council sanctions list and a warrant was issued for his arrest in the DRC.

On 12 November 2012 Pinga was captured by NDC and remained under its control as of March 2013. In November 2013 NDC withdrew from Pinga and kidnapped dozens of women as sex slaves. In July 2014 armed forces launched offensive against NDC recapturing Kashebere-Walikale road including its stronghold of Buniyampuli.

In 2017, Sheka surrendered to the DRC in North Kivu. On 24 November 2020, a military court has sentenced Sheka to life for war crimes including murder, sexual slavery and child soldier recruitment.

The UN Security Council has documented numerous cases of the NDC recruiting child soldiers. According to a 2014 report, at least 33 children separated from the group. They said their roles included carrying ammunition and acting as talisman, as well as "combatants, cooks, marijuana farmers and tax collectors." The children were held to the group through a mixture of threats to their family or the payment of $10–12 per month.

A 2014 splinter saw the new group NCD-Renouveau created by former NDC deputy Guidon (or Guido).

== See also ==
- Second Congo War
- Sexual violence in the Democratic Republic of the Congo
- Kivu conflict
- Raia Mutomboki
