= Mai-Mai Simba =

Militia group in the Democratic Republic of the Congo

- Dates active: 1964–
- Country: Democratic Republic of the Congo
- Headquarters: Maiko National Park
- Active regions: North Kivu, Maniema and Ituri

Mai-Mai Simba is a coalition of armed groups descended from the 1960s Simba rebels, currently occupying the Maiko National Park in the east of the Democratic Republic of the Congo.

== History ==
Following the destruction of the People's Republic of the Congo (Stanleyville) in November 1964 the rebels from the Maniema province gradually withdrew to the Maiko forest.

In April 2001 Mai-Mai Simba and FARDC clashed in northern Katanga. In November 2001 they clashed with Army for the Liberation of Rwanda.

In December 2009 FARDC incursion in the region led to heavy clashes between Bitule and Osso over control of mining sites. In July 2010 FARDC clashed with the Mayi Mayi Simba over the mining sites of Pumuzika and Ujumo, west of Kasese, where the rebels tried to seize control.

Between 8 and 10 September 2013, according to a news report, Maï Maï Simba rebels abducted and killed at least eight people at Angoa site, including miners, farmers, and merchants. On 7 February 2020 the Mai-Mai Simba under the command of Mangalibi ambushed the FARDC near Egombo, Lubero territory. An FARDC soldier was wounded in the attack. On 4 March 2021 ten Mai-Mai Simba soldiers led by war lord Morgan attacked the village of Makumo killing one soldier and wounding four civilians.

== Subgroups ==
=== Mai-Mai Simba FDS (Forces Divines Simba) ===
- Led by general Mando Mazeri.

=== Mai-Mai Simba (Manu) ===
- Paul Sadala alias Morgan (2011–2014) †: In 2011, styled Morgan, he initiated the militant group "Mai Mai Lumumba" while it was commonly known as "Mai Mai Morgan". He was killed on 14 April 2014 in a gun battle with the authorities.
- Manu (2014–2019) †
- Mangalibi

=== Mai-Mai Simba UPLD ===
- General Michigan (–2007)
- Luc Yabili (2007–2022) #
