= National Council for Renewal and Democracy =

National Council for Renewal and Democracy Conseil National pour le Renouveau et la Démocratie - CNRD UBWIYUNGE
- President: Wilson Irategeka
- Founded: 31 May 2016
- Ideology: Rwandan interests

The National Council for Renewal and Democracy (French: Conseil National pour le Renouveau et la Démocratie, CNRD-UBWIYUNGE) is a Rwandan political opposition party in exile. CNRD-UBWIYUNGE was formed on May 31, 2016, by members of the Rwandan refugee community in the Democratic Republic of the Congo (DRC) with the objective to organize for the return in peace and dignity. A split in the Democratic Forces for the Liberation of Rwanda (FDLR) resulted in the creation of the new movement, led by Col. Wilson IRATEGEKA.
