= Wazalendo =

Pro-government paramilitary in the DRC

- Zones of control in the M23 campaign as of 3 April 2025. Wazalendo presence is marked by light coffee-coloured hatching.
- Dates active: May 2023–present
- Merger of: Alliance of Patriots for a Free and Sovereign Congo (APCLS); Nduma Defense of Congo-Renovated (NDC-R); Patriotic Self-Defense Movement (MPA); Mai-Mai Mazembe; Nyatura
- Country: Democratic Republic of the Congo
- Allegiance: Democratic Republic of the Congo
- Headquarters: Pinga
- Active regions: Democratic Republic of the Congo
- Ideology: Anti-M23, Anti-Congo River Alliance
- Status: Active
- Wars: Kivu conflict

The Wazalendo (Swahili; lit. 'patriots' or 'nationalists') is a Congolese rebel coalition and irregular force based in the eastern Democratic Republic of the Congo. It is made up of rebel groups allied with the official Congolese military (FARDC) and opposed to the M23 rebel group. It consists of the Alliance of Patriots for a Free and Sovereign Congo (APCLS), Nduma Defense of Congo-Renovated (NDC-R), Patriotic Self-Defense Movement (MPA), and different Nyatura groups.

== History ==
In November 2022, President Félix Tshisekedi called for the formation of "vigilance groups against the expansionist ambitions" of the M23. The response was increased recruitment for the official FARDC military forces, but rebel groups also claimed the mantle of resisting the M23.

On May 8–9, 2023, several rebel groups and FARDC officers met in the town of Pinga and negotiated a nonaggression pact and the creation of a patriotic coalition to resist the M23. The FARDC officers were led by Col. Salomon Tokolonga, commander of the 3411th regiment. While the alliance was initially organized in secret, the government officially legalized the use of militias within FARDC on September 3, 2023.

The Wazalendo fought in the Second Battle of Kitshanga against the M23.

== See also ==
- Economy of Rwanda
- Economy of the Democratic Republic of Congo
