= Pinga, Democratic Republic of the Congo =

Pinga
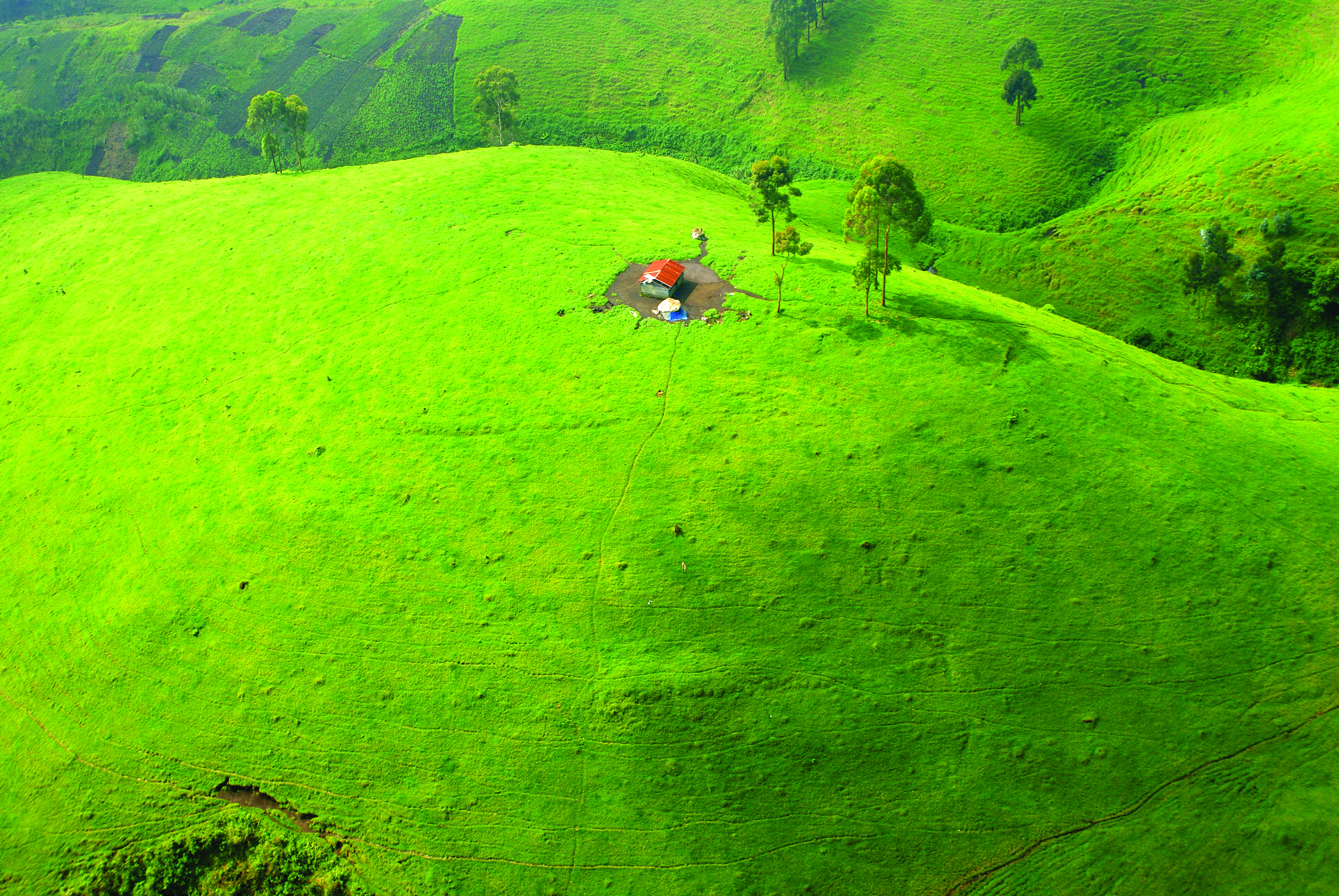
- Landscape of Pinga

- Location in Democratic Republic of Congo
- Coordinates: 0°59′0″S 28°41′51″E
- Country: Democratic Republic of the Congo
- Province: North Kivu
- Territory: Walikale Territory
- Time zone: UTC+2 (CAT)

Pinga is a village located in the Democratic Republic of the Congo province of North Kivu.

== History ==
In 2012 alone control of Pinga changed six times. On 12 November 2012 Pinga was captured by Nduma Defense of Congo (NDC) and remained under its control as of March 2013. In November 2013 NDC withdrew from Pinga and kidnapped dozens of women as sex slaves. Later it became headquarters of a splinter group of NDC, Nduma Defense of Congo-Renovated (NDC-R).

On 20 July 2020, a battle broke out in Pinga between the two factions of NDC-R. Overall in the battle, 28 NDC-R soldiers were killed and four were wounded, four FARDC soldiers were killed and five were wounded, and five civilians were killed and three were wounded.
