= RUD-Urunana =

Rwandan Hutu militia

RUD-Uruana
- Logo of the RUD-Urunana
- Military leader: Nsengiyunva Emmanuel "Faida"
- Political leader: Jean-Marie Higiro
- Founded: 2005
- Dates active: 2005–present
- Split from: Democratic Forces for the Liberation of Rwanda (FDLR)
- Allegiance: Wazalendo
- Headquarters: Mashuta, Kalehe, Walikale
- Active regions: Primarily Binza and Kirama, Rutshuru, North Kivu, Democratic Republic of the Congo
- Ideology: Anti-Rwanda; Hutu Power
- Status: Active
- Size: 250 soldiers (in 2010)
- Wars: Kivu conflict
- Website: www.rud-urunana.org

Rally for Unity and Democracy (French: Rassemblement Unité et Démocratie) also Known as RUD-Urunana is a Democratic Forces for the Liberation of Rwanda (FDLR) splinter group fighting in the Democratic Republic of the Congo (DRC). The group is based in Rutshuru, North Kivu.

== History ==
=== 2005-2007: Creation ===
RUD-Urunana was created in June 2005 by former vice-president of the FDLR, Jean-Marie Higiro. Higiro and other political leaders of RUD-Urunana were mostly based in Europe and the United States. Since its creation the groups military wing was led by Jean-Damascène Ndibabaje also known by the Nom de guerre "Musare". The group presented themselves as a moderate counterweight against the FDLR, demanding that the FDLR would expel war criminals out of its ranks. In April 2006 Rwandan government accused Uganda of supporting and training FDLR and RUD-Urunana troops inside their borders with the goal to overthrow the government of Paul Kagame.

=== 2007-2009: Disarmament ===
In 2007 after peace talks with the Congolese government facilitated by the Community of Sant'Egidio, RUD-Urunana pledged to disarm themselves. The peace talks were dismissed by the FDLR who stated that the RUD-Urunana were "dissidents who have been excluded from the FDLR for high treason". In 2008 RUD-Urunana and FDLR clashed near Kiseguru 90 kilometers from Goma, allegedly due to RUD-Urunana looting nearby villages. In 2009 the group ended the disarmation process with around 150 combatants disarmed. The disarmament process failed in 2009 as RUD-Urunana failed to gain protection from MONUSCO troops and weren't committed to laying down arms completely. After the failure of the disarmament process, RUD-Urunana formally joined forces with FDLR to continue fighting as a faction under the FDLR.

RUD-Urunana military leader Musane (second on the left)

=== 2009-2019: Continued fighting ===
On from January to April 2009, RUD-Urunana combatants committed attacks against civilians in Lubero, northeastern Walikale, and Rutshuru territories around North Kivu. These attacks left at least 70 civilians dead In February 2012 the Armed Forces of the Democratic Republic of the Congo (FARDC) captured the main headquarters of RUD-Urunana located in Machuka, around 100 kilometers from Lubero in North Kivu. According to the FARDC the clashes killed two RUD-Urunana members, one man and one woman. In June 2012, the UN accused RUD-Urunana of collaborating with the Union of Congolese Patriots (UPC) militia. In May and July 2013 RUD-Urunana attacked Rwandan Defence Force (RDF) positions killing several RDF soldiers in the process. The leader of RUD-Urunanas military wing, Musare, was killed in unknown circumstances in February 2016. The murder was allegedly related to the growing rift between Hutu- and Nande-based armed groups in the region. After the death of Musare, Juvenal Musabimana also known as "Jean-Michel Africa" became the new leader of RUD-Urunana. Musabimana led the group for three years from 2016 to 2019. In 2017 RUD-Urunana controlled areas around Bukoma in Rutshuru Territory, where it was accused of being involved in abductions of civilians.

=== October 2019: Incursion in to Rwanda ===
On 4 October 2019, 67 members of the RUD-Urunana allied with another Rwandan opposition militia named Rwanda National Congress (RNC) armed with 38 rifles and other rudimentary weapons, made an incursion to Rwanda with the goal of overthrowing the government. Using Rifles, clubs and knives the rebels attacked civilians in the Musanze District killing 14 and injuring 18. The attack also killed around 19 rebels, with the surviving rebels escaping back to Congo and Uganda. RUD-Urunana denied involvement in the attacks stating that their "forces had no role in the attacks". The Rwandan government wrote a verbale concerning the attack and alleged that Uganda was sheltering RUD-Urunana commanders who had escaped to Uganda, after the attack. In November 2019 Musabimana was killed alongside commander Cassien Nshimiyiman and four bodyguards. The operation to neutralize Musabimana was named Sukola II and carried out by the FARDC, in the Binza area near the Ugandan border. After Musabimana was killed Jean-Marie Higiro, the political leader of RUD-Urunana, stated that he did not belong to the group and had left RUD-Urunana to join another Rwandan opposition group named FDU-Inkingi.

After the operation FARDC sources revealed information regarding the creation of RUD-Urunana. According to the information Musabimana frequently travelled to Uganda and had extensive ties to Ugandan top-security officials. Same sources alleged that RUD-Urunana was created by Ugandan military intelligence under the coordination of Philemon Mateke. The sources stated that Mateke was tasked with "destabilizing Rwanda". During the operation FARDC also announced to have discovered two thousand hectares of cannabis cultivations belonging to the RUD-Urunana. According to the FARDC these cultivations provided 50% of the rebels income. According to an investigation conducted by the Rwanda Tribune Musabimana had confiscated farming equipment around 500 hectares of land in the Groupements of Binza and Kirama. Musabimana also owned a house in Uganda worth around 2 million dollars.

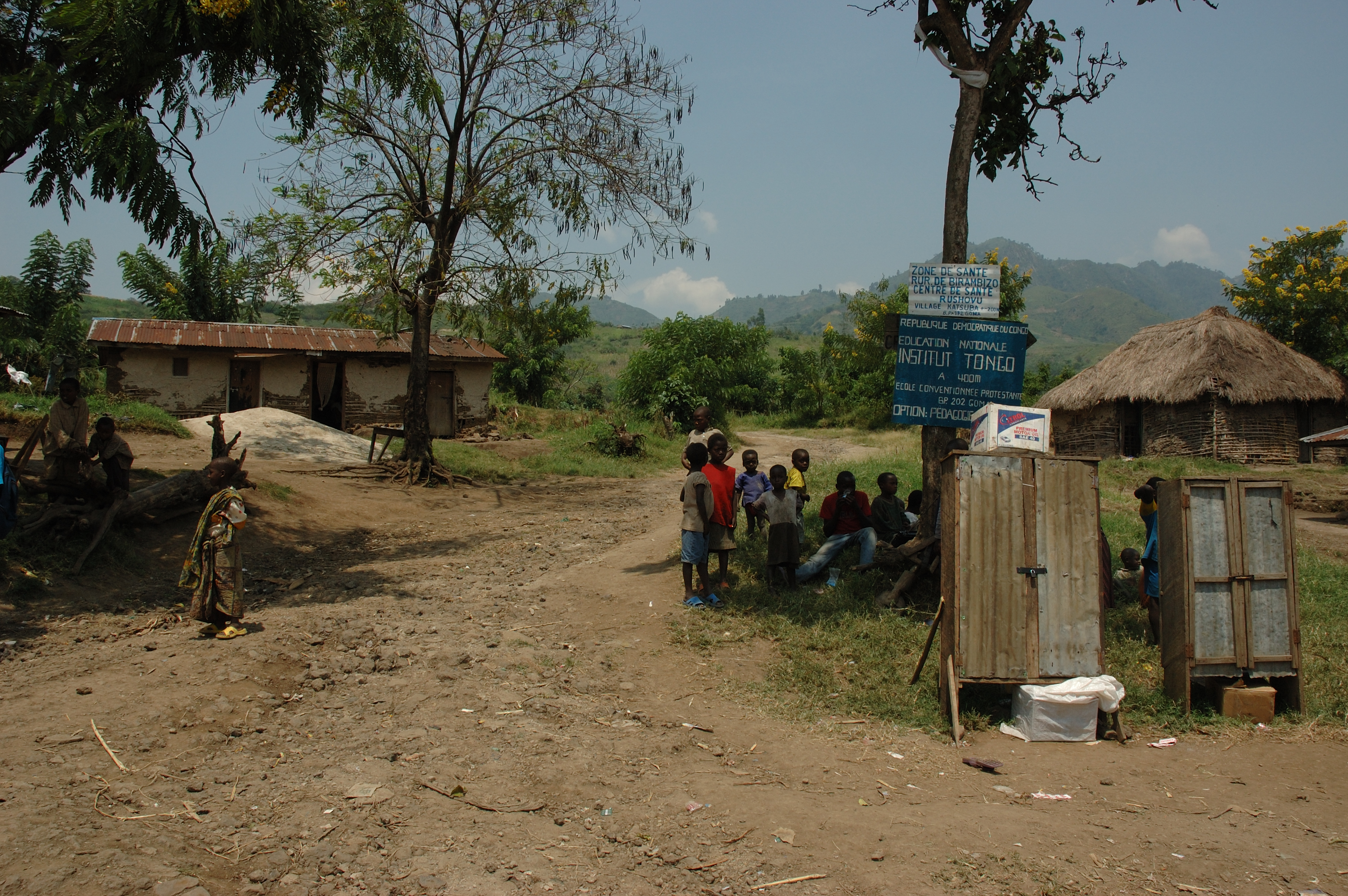
Children escaping fighting Ruthshuru territory

The killing Musabimana caused internal conflict in RUD-Urunana. After the killing a Crisis Committee was formed by other commanders, who accused 24 RUD-Urunana members of betraying Musabimana. The Crisis Committee tried to disarm the accused which lead to clashes killing around 14 rebels one of which had been the doctor of Musambimana. In total around 24 rebels were killed for "betraying" Musabimana.

=== 2019-2020: Leadership struggles ===
After the death of Juvenal Musabimana, RUD-Urunana was led by Cyprien Leo Mpiranya, also known as Kagoma. Kagoma has been accused of being involved with the killing of American tourists in Bwindi National Park in 1999, when he was fighting for the Interhamwe. During Kagomas rule RUD-Urunana attacked the village of Katwiguru in Rutshuru territory killing 3 civilians. They also conducted another attack in Binza area killing 14 civilians. In February 2020 Uganda sent 15 rebels to Rwanda of which two were RUD-Urunana rebels. The response had stemmed from a meeting held in December 2019, between a Rwandan delegation and Ugandan leaders, over restoring relations between the two countries. In August 2020 Kagoma was killed in a FARDC operation, although it's disputed if the killing involved another RUD-Urunana commander, Emmanuel Rugema, with whom Kagoma had disagreements even resulting in the group being split in two, with one side supporting Kagoma and the other Rugema. After the killing of Kagoma, Rugema became the leader of the RUD-Urunana before being killed in November 2020, by his own troops defending the leadership of Kagoma.

=== 2020-Present: Clashes with M23 and alliance with the FARDC ===
Rugema was replaced by Cassien Nshimiyimana also known as Gavana. Gavana was one of the commanders who managed to escape the FARDC operation in 2019, as he was hiding in Uganda at the time. In March 2021, 8, RUD-Urunana soldiers and 29 RNC members were brought to court in Rwanda regarding the incursion made to Rwanda in 2019. Gavana was killed in December 2022, by the M23 rebel group in Bwiza. According to M23 Gavana attacked an M23 base alongside the FARDC. Gavana was replaced by Nsengiyunva Emmanuel also known as Faida Hakimu.

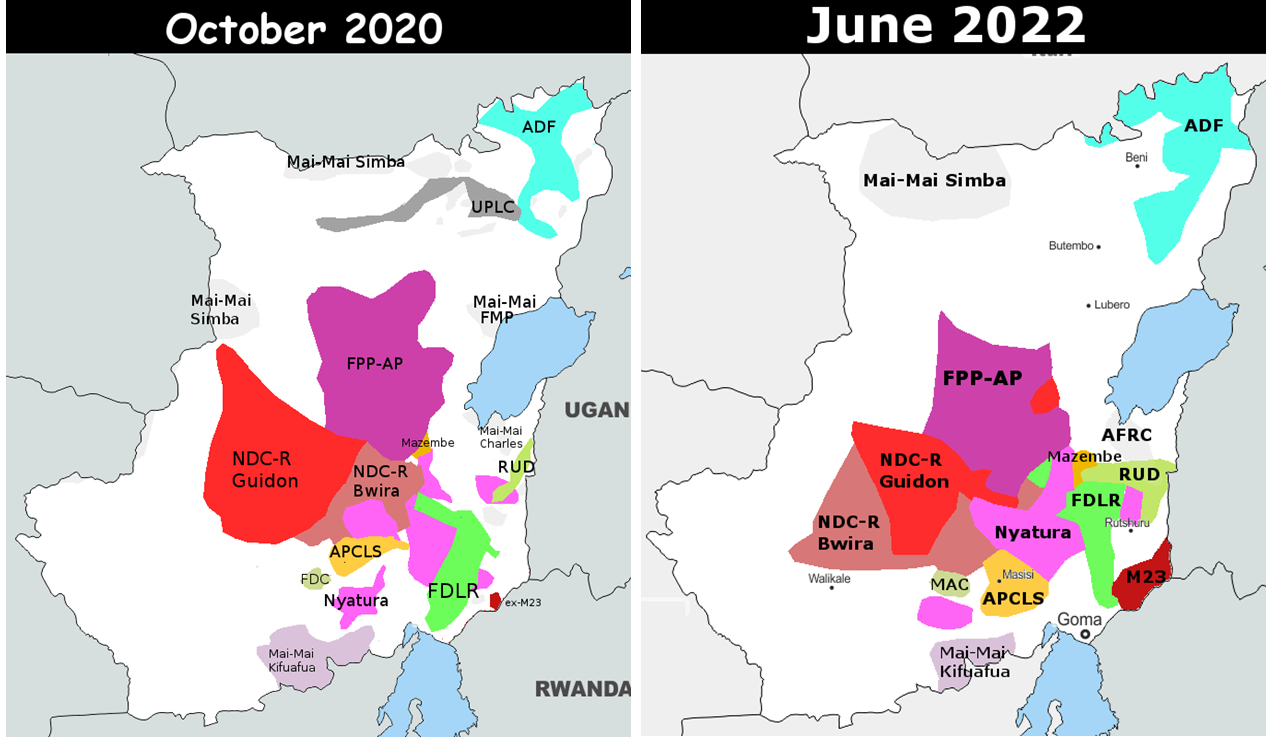
Development of RUD-Urunanas territory from October 2020 to June 2022

In August 2025 Amnesty international reported that RUD-Urunana controlled some areas near Virunga National Park including the Bwisha chiefdom in Binza. In March of the same year Rwanda sanctioned three individuals linked to RUD-Urunana including commanders suspected of having planned the 2019 attacks in Rwanda. In 2026 RUD-Urunana reportedly changed its name to FDP-R which is under the Nyatura-FDP forces in Rutshuru territory. The rebranding aimed at distancing RUD-Urunana from the FDLR. RUD-Urunana reportedly belongs to the militant coalition Wazalendo, which is fighting against the M23 and is led by the FARDC.

== Recruitment and child soldiers ==
Most of the fighters who splintered from the FDLR in 2004 were former Rwandan Patriotic Front (RPF) fighters from Rwanda who had escaped to Congo after the end of the Rwandan Genocide. Since January 2009 RUD-Urunana has mostly recruited fighters from refugee camps in Uganda, particularly the from the camps of Nyakivale and Cyaka. UN Security Council has accused RUD-Urunana of recruiting and kidnapping children to use as fighters in the region.
