= Raia Mutomboki =

Anti hutu militia, participant of the Kivu conflict

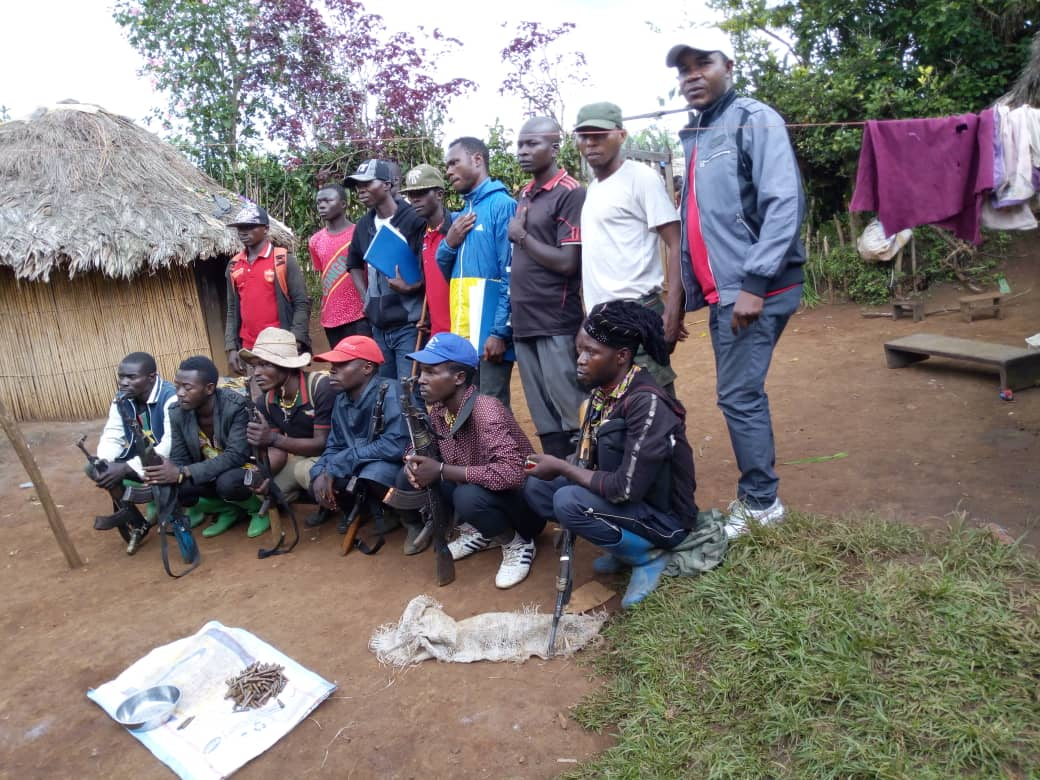
- Raïa Mutomboki fighters pictured at Kalehe, South Kivu in March 2019
- Leaders: Jean Musumbu; Paul Ngumbi Wangozi; Isaac Chirambiza
- Dates active: 2005-present
- Active regions: North and South Kivu in the Democratic Republic of the Congo
- Wars: Kivu Conflict

Raïa Mutomboki or Raiya Mutomboki (Swahili; lit. 'an angry citizen') are a Mai-Mai militia operating in the South Kivu region in the eastern Democratic Republic of the Congo. The group formed in 2005 to fight against Rwandan Hutu groups such as the Democratic Forces for the Liberation of Rwanda (FDLR) as part of the Kivu conflict.

== History ==
The group was founded by Pastor Jean Musumbu, who had defected from the Armed Forces of the Democratic Republic of the Congo (FARDC) in response to massacres by the FDLR. Raïa Mutomboki is said to use a 'snowballing' recruitment strategy whereby a village is defended or liberated from FDLR or related forces and the males from that village are initiated into the group. The group emerged and reemerged as a reaction to the Congolese Army's relative absence in North and South Kivu. In 2011, the group was reinvigorated when infighting in the Congolese army caused them to withdraw from the fight in eastern provinces. The group's existence is largely a result of the failure of the "policy of disarmament, demobilisation, and reintegration" that was part of the Sun City Agreement that ended the Second Congo War.

By 2012, Raïa Mutomboki had stood accused by a United Nations Security Council panel of experts of the killing of more than 260 civilians. Paul Ngumbi Wangozi, known as Sisawa, had reportedly been a leader of Raïa Mutomboki up until his death in battle with the Congolese army in September 2014. A year later, his widow Cynthia surrendered along with 71 Raïa Mutomboki members to Congolese army forces.

In September 2018, Raïa Mutomboki militiamen allegedly gang raped 17 women in the Lubila region of South Kivu. Child soldiers were said to be involved in the incident. The assault was said to be led by Masudi Alimasi Kokodikoko, leader of a faction of Raïa Mutomboki at this time. In 2018, a second leader of a Raïa Mutomboki faction, Isaac Chirambiza, was arrested by army forces on accusation of systematic rapes. In April 2019, Kokodikoko was arrested by the army for the September 2018 gang rapes.

They were accused of voter intimidation in the 2018 Democratic Republic of the Congo general election.

== See also ==
- Kivu conflict
- Second Congo War
- Sexual violence in the Democratic Republic of the Congo
