= Sun City Agreement =

Agreement attempting to end the Second Congo War

The Sun City Agreement was an agreement signed between some of the warring parties in the Second Congo War on 2 April 2003 at the luxury South African casino resort of Sun City, as a result of the Inter-Congolese dialogue (ICD). Delegates hoped that this would be a historic "final act", ending more than four years of war and setting up a government of national unity.

On 17 April 2002, the government of President Joseph Kabila and the Movement for the Liberation of the Congo (MLC) reached a deal in Sun City to form a transitional government, but it was rejected by the Rally for Congolese Democracy–Goma (RCD–Goma). International pressure on Rwanda and the rebels led to the Global and All-Inclusive Agreement (AGI) on 17 December 2002, the final act of which was confirmed by all rebel groups in Sun City on 2 April 2003, where a transitional constitution was also adopted.

The agreement was witnessed by South African President Thabo Mbeki as well as the heads of state of Botswana, Namibia, Zambia and Zimbabwe. In his speech during the meeting, Mbeki praised the delegates who had spent 19 months involved in the ICD negotiations.

== Participants ==
The partial agreement was reached between the government, the Ugandan-backed Mouvement de liberation du Congo (MLC) armed opposition group and a majority of civil society and unarmed political opposition groups. Unfortunately, the parties were not able to establish a new constitution and government, despite repeated attempts.

However, another armed opposition movement, the Rassemblement congolais pour la democratie (RCD-Goma), backed by Rwanda, along with several parties of the unarmed political opposition including the Union pour la Democratie et le Progres Social (UDPS) of the veteran Congolese politician and former prime minister, Etienne Tshisekedi refused to sign the accord, which led to concerns about a return to violence.

== Treaty terms ==
The agreement laid down a framework for providing the Congo with a unified, multi-party government and a timeline for democratic elections.

Among other stipulations, the agreement allowed Joseph Kabila to remain president of the Democratic Republic of the Congo during a transition period of two years, extendable to three, with Jean-Pierre Bemba (the leader of the MLC) serving as prime minister in a transitional government.

It was further stipulated that Kabila would share power with four vice-presidents - one from each of the two main armed opposition movements, one from the government and one from the unarmed political opposition. Ministries would be divided up and former opposition fighters would be integrated into the army and police.

After the conclusion of the accord, critics noted that there were no stipulations regarding the unification of the army, which weakened the effectiveness of the agreement. There were several reported breaches of the agreement, but initially it resulted in a reduction in the fighting.

There was also criticism that the delegates were not provided with a complete dossier of documentation at the end of the agreement (such as minutes of meetings, commission reports and resolutions), which hindered informed debate in the Congo. It was also felt that the principles which guided the formation of the follow-up organs of the Sun City Agreement were not clear.

The Sun City Agreement did not stop the conflict, as shown by subsequent events (see Second Congo War).

During the agreement, the delegates considered giving the country of the Democratic Republic of the Congo away to the Kingdom of Belgium in exchange for humanitarian aid and sending an intervention force to help the central government fight the Rwandan/Ugandan backed Congolese rebels.
