= Alliance of Patriots for a Free and Sovereign Congo =

Rebel group in the DRC

Alliance of Patriots for a Free and Sovereign Congo Alliance des patriotes pour un Congo libre et souverain (in French)
- Leader: Janvier Buingo Karairi
- Dates active: 2006–present
- Active regions: North Kivu, Democratic Republic of the Congo
- Ideology: Congolese nationalism Anti-Tutsi sentiment
- Size: 1,500 men (claimed)

The Alliance of Patriots for a Free and Sovereign Congo (French: Alliance des patriotes pour un Congo libre et souverain; APCLS) is an armed militia group which operates in the north-east of the Democratic Republic of the Congo. APCLS is traditionally active in Masisi Territory in North Kivu, and is considered one of the largest mai-mai (local or ethnic militia) groups operating in that province. Formed in 2006, the APCLS draws most of its support from the Hunde ethnic group. Its ideology is founded on opposition to the Tutsi ethnic groups who are believed to threaten the integrity of the Congolese state and to be supported, in particular, by Rwanda. The APCLS is a belligerent in the ongoing Kivu conflict and is led by Janvier Buingo Karairi, known as General Janvier.

== History ==
The APCLS was formed as part of the Resisting Congolese Patriots (Patriotes Résistants Congolais, or PARECO) group in 2006 and was originally known as PARECO-Hunde. The group split from PARECO in 2008 after the Goma Accords. The militia counts around 1,500 men and is funded by the profits from artisanal mining of gold and cassiterite, as well through the support of wealthy members of the Hunde ethnic group. In the past, the group has co-operated with the Democratic Forces for the Liberation of Rwanda (Forces démocratiques de libération du Rwanda, FDLR), a Hutu Interahamwe rebel group from neighbouring Rwanda.

During the M23 rebellion (2012–13), the APCLS co-operated with Congolese government forces to suppress the largely-Tutsi March 23 Movement. Sporadic fighting between government forces, backed by the United Nations MONUSCO peacekeeping mission, and APCLS continued for several years. In March 2015, government forces launched a major offensive against the APCLS in Masisi Territory. In August 2016, the APCLS, together with another militia, the Mai-Mai Nyatura, a Hutu group active in the same region, announced that they would sign a peace agreement with the central government.

By January 2023, the APCLS was fighting alongside the Congolese government forces against the M23 Movement's revived offensive in North Kivu.

The war has led to an unprecedented surge in child recruitment in eastern Congo by all sides of the conflict, according to international reports. These children join militias due to poverty or abduction where they are exploited for dangerous tasks such as transporting ammunition or serving as guards. The APCLS and other Wazalindo groups are among the most prominent militias that employ child soldiers known as Kadogos.
