= Nduma Defense of Congo-Renovated =

Militia group in the Democratic Republic of the Congo

- Nduma Défense du Congo-Rénové
- Flag used by the 114th NDC-R Brigade
- Other name: NDC Guidon
- Leader: Shimiray Mwissa Guidon
- Dates active: September 2014–present
- Split from: Nduma Defense of Congo
- Split to: Nduma Defense of Congo-Renovated/Mapenzi (NDC-R/M)
- Country: Democratic Republic of the Congo
- Headquarters: Pinga, Walikale Territory
- Active regions: North Kivu and South Kivu
- Size: 1,000–1,250 (2018); 5,000 (June 2020) (Estimate by active combatants)

Nduma Defense of Congo—Renovated (French: Nduma défense du Congo-Rénové) is a Congolese rebel group operating in northeastern Democratic Republic of the Congo. It is a splinter faction of the Nduma Defense of Congo (NDC) and controls large parts of the North Kivu province, and has been a major participant of the Kivu conflict since its split from the NDC in 2014.

== History ==
=== Creation and split from the NDC ===
In September 2014, Guidon split from Nduma Defense of Congo (NDC) and created a rival faction called the NDC–Rénové along with other NDC commanders, in particular the movement’s head of intelligence, Gilbert Bwira Chuo, who became his deputy. Its creation was due to internal disagreements over the sharing of revenues and leadership in the original group of the NDC. Sheka, who was then the leader of the NDC, kept annoying his associates over his alleged tendency to take sole credit for their exploits and over the uneven sharing of funds. This, along with his tendency to not pay his soldiers, led many of his forces to leave him to join Guidon and all of his other co-conspirators in forming the new group. It did not help that Sheka, who had failed in his candidacy for a seat in parliament in 2011, had been indicted by a Congolese military tribunal and sanctioned by the UN Security Council for his role in the 2010 Luvungi rapes.

Just as FARDC officers played a critical role in the NDC’s creation, they also helped bring about its split. Disappointed with Sheka, Guidon sought out advice from local FARDC commanders, including Nyanga, Tembo, and Hunde colonels César Nkoyo, Dodet Kamanda, Damiano Mbaenda, and Akilimali Shemondo. While relationships between Guidon and the FARDC were distinct at the time, one NDC–R leader says they have “become more concrete” since then.

=== Gaining strength ===
After its split from the NDC, the NDC-R started gaining support from both mining entrepreneurs in the CEMIKA cooperative and local civilians who were becoming increasingly worried that Sheka's bad reputation would become a problem in defending the interest of the Walikale Territory.

NDC-R first operations were attacking NDC positions in and around the town of Misau. This operation reveived support from elements of the FARDC, specifically officers in the 802th and 804th regiments located in the town of Pinga and Walikale, respectively. These officers wanted to support the NDC-R due to its anti-NDC stance. They didn't like the fact that the NDC had been skirmishing with FARDC forces in the area. These officers were also alleged to have been Guidon’s partners in the gold trade. And finally, according to sources within the NDC-R itself, the governor at the time encouraged the FARDC’s backing of Guidon.

What followed was a string of internecine battles that further strengthened NDC-R's position over the NDC. By late 2014, the NDC–R had already established control over the Ihana groupement, Sheka’s historical stronghold, and the Kisimba II groupement in northeast Walikale territory. The FARDC would also later start a significant crackdown on the NDC. Eventually triggering Sheka led NDC to surrender to MONUSCO in July 2017. Even after being facing military pressure by the NDC-R, FARDC, and MONUSCO, the NDC would keep on living just under a new leader by the name of Mandaima.

=== Fighting the FDLR and allies ===
With most of the former NDC being defeated Guidon outlined a set of new priorities, including the fight against the FDLR, promising that the indigenous population could control its land and resources, and the increased representation of Nyanga in the Congolese government and army.

Even before Sheka's surrender to the MONUSCO the NDC had already lost much of its former power that the Congolese could start a new set of operations against the FLDR in late 2015. These new operations known as Sukola II would benefit the NDC-R as the group received significant support from the national army due to its help in fighting the FLDR and would also play an important role in the NDC-R dramatic expansion into new lands. But as the NDC-R expanded into areas such as Lubero territory, the local Nande community would start to mobilize against them.

After the start of these new operations, the NDC-R started working more extensively with the national army, moving north and west from its traditional area of operations, and into southern Lubero territory. This move into south Lubero was unusual as most armed groups in the Kivus tended to operate in their respective ethnic communities and not venture out much. Doing so would mean living side-by-side to people who were very different from you. However, in the case of the NDC–R, it was very different as the Kobo and Nande communities in Lubero initially welcomed them. Though this did not last long as the NDC-R would impose a harsh regime of governance and taxation on the communities. This led to them being seen as just another occupying force like the FDLR.

The NDC-R expansion northward caused friction with the UPCP who had been living there for about a decade. The group led by Kakule Sikuli also known as “Lafontaine” had been controlled the gold-rich hills surrounding Bunyatenge and Pitakongo and just so happened to be an ally of the FDLR.

Around the same time, the NDC-R also expanded its influence into northern Bwito chieftaincy, Rutshuru territory. There NDC-R forces teamed up with Mazembe militias in attacking Nyatura groups, who had been supported and trained by the FDLR. These operations weakened the FDLR, who lost some of its most important positions and brought the collapse of Lafontaine’s UPCP. Forces in the former UPCP would then join up with Mazembe militias and get some to turn on the NDC-R. And any UPCP that remained was kicked out shortly after by the NDC-R.

=== Expanding into Masisi Territory ===
Expansions of the NDC-R with peak territorial control in early 2020

In late 2018 the NDC-R started to expand into northern Masisi Territory, taking advantage of the recent split within the APCLS. The NDC-R started working with the splinter group APLCS-Rénové. Though it wouldn't last, the APLCS-Rénové was quickly absorbed by the NDC-R. The NDC-R would also start fighting the CNRD in Masis, pushing out into South Kivu. Then the NDC-R would start fighting many smaller Nyatura groups in northeastern Masisi. The Nyatura group led by Kavumbi surrendered to the FARDC in January 2019. Leaving deserters from other Nyatura groups and the CNRD to join the NDC–R. By mid-2019, the only main opponents left were members of the CMC alliance. The CMC alliance is a coalition between many different Nyatura groups. Any other Nyatura groups not in the CMC mostly joined the NDC-R. Throughout 2019, the NDC–R continued to expand eastward absorbing many different armed groups of many different ethnic groups. In September 2019, the commander of the FDLR, Sylvestre Mudacumura, was killed by his own troops. After Mudacumuara's death, the CMC was finally able to win some battles against the, until that point, undefeated NDC-R. So in November 2019, the NDC–R backed by both the army and non-CMC Nyatura, pushed into Bwito chieftaincy for a second time to attack the CMC. Forcing the CMC to fight on multiple fronts the NDC-R got the leader Nzeyimana Heri to surrender to UN troops. Thought clashes would continue with the CMC throughout December and into January 2020.

In January 2015 group expanded into Lubero Territory. In December 2015 they captured FDLR bases in Mumo and Rushiye. On 25 December 2018 NDC-R attacked CNRD in Faringa. On 7 June 2019, the Office of the Military Prosecutor of North Kivu issued a warrant for Guidon’s arrest. On 30 October 2019 NDC-R attacked CMC alliance capturing Katsiru, Kiyeye, Kitunda, Maziza, JTN, Kayangare and Mbuhi villages in Rutshuru Territory. On 7 November the group regained control over Mweso.

=== Before Civil War ===
In December 2019, Guidon announced a new coalition between his group and many of his allies known as Réseau des patriotes résistants congolais (RPRC).

=== Civil War ===
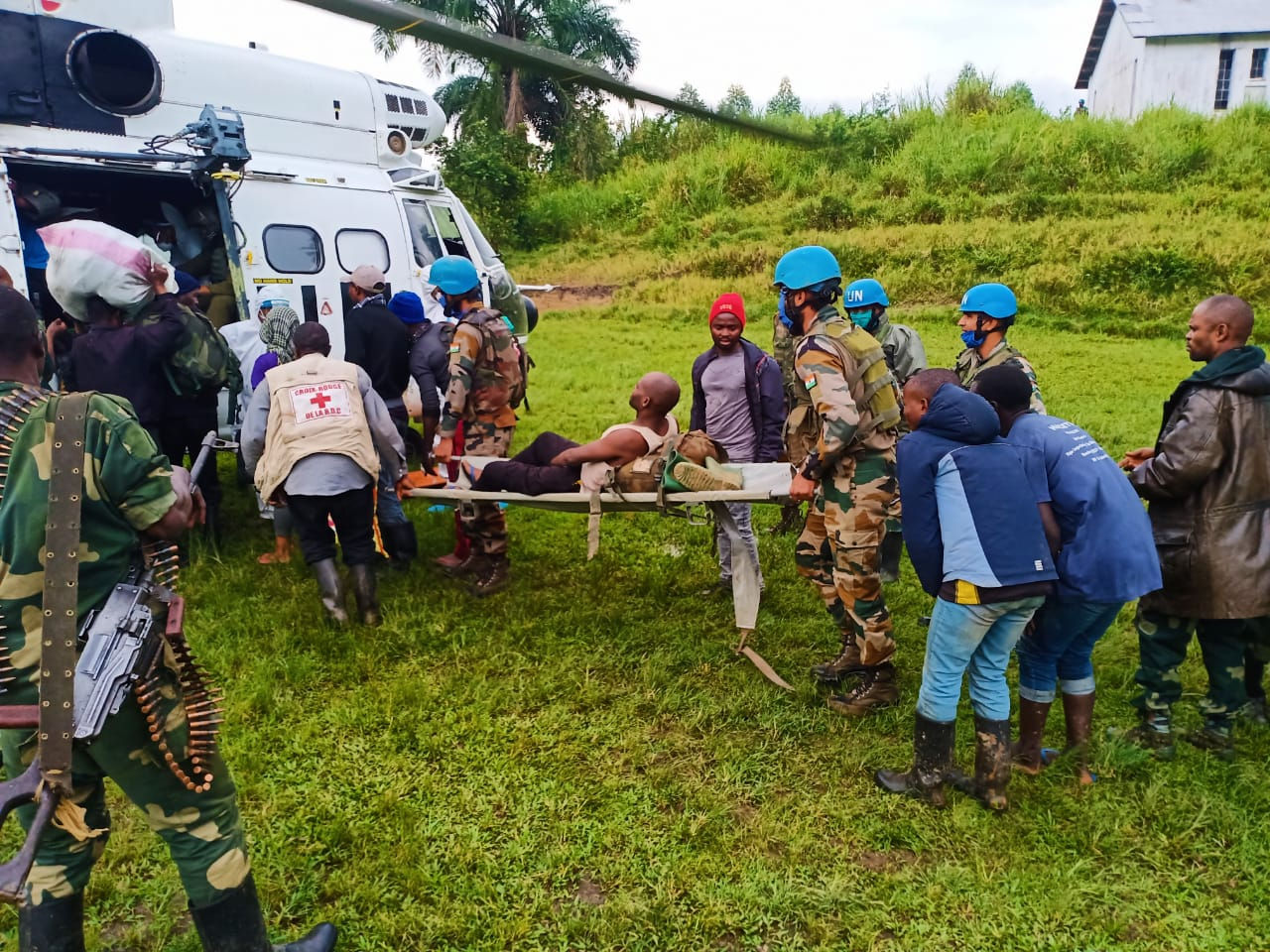
MONUSCO evacuates victims of the battle between the two factions of the NDC-R for the control of Pinga, 21 July 2020.

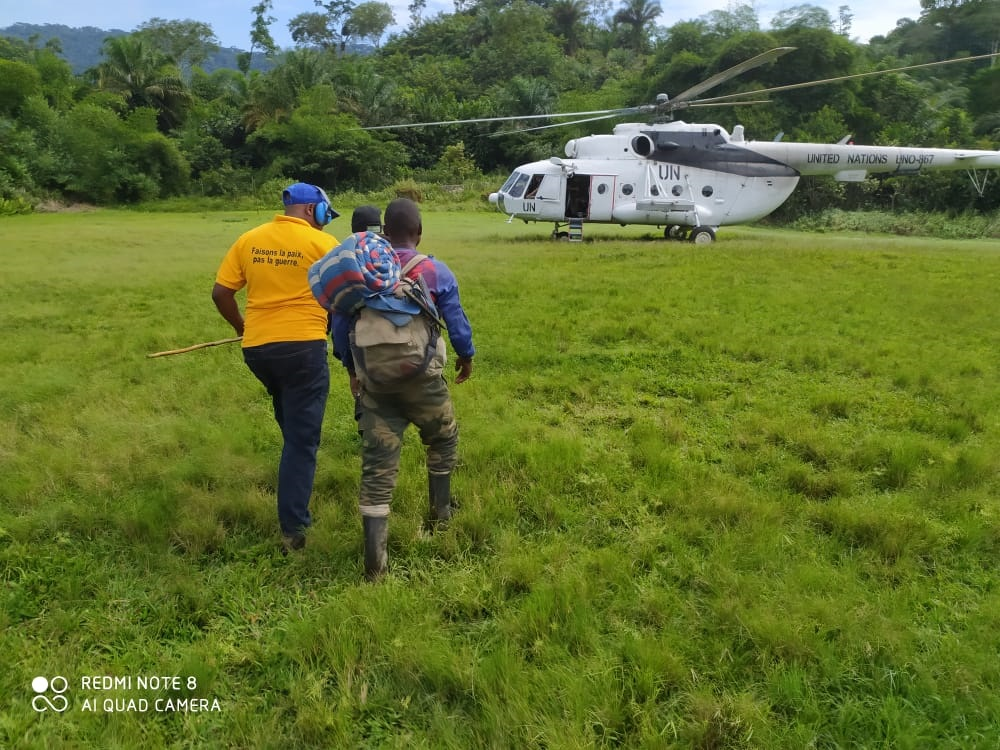
NDC-R fighter surrenders to MONUSCO, April 2021

On 8 July 2020, deputy leader Gilbert Bwira Shuo attempted to gain control of the group from Shimiray Guidon. The army intervened and started supporting Shuo's forces against Guidon.

On 20 July 2020, a battle broke out in Pinga between the two factions with Shuo getting support from the army. Overall in the battle, 28 NDC-R soldiers were killed and four were wounded, four FARDC soldiers were killed and five were wounded, and five civilians were killed and three were wounded. On 19 August 500 soldiers loyal to Bwira surrendered to Congolese Armed Forces.

In late August 2021 Guidon Shimiray Mwisa, leader of NDC-R surrender to the Congolese government.

== Human rights abuses ==
=== Recruitment of child soldiers ===
From 2014 to 2017 NDC-R recruited approximately 164 children, including 144 boys and 20 girls. 46 of them were under 15-years old.

=== Rape ===
Inside of area of NDC-R's control, survivors have claimed that several fighters would take women and girls away and rape them. Sometimes this would be a one-time occurrence for the victims, or in other cases, the women and girls would be forced into sexual slavery. If they resist they are shot. The girls can be as young as 14 years of age.

An activist gave this account: "When (NDC-R fighters) meet pretty underage girls, they forcibly take them to their camps.… They use them as wives for a while, then chase them away. They have to go home. It’s like taking turns; they take other pretty girls afterwards. That’s what happens. They are kept for several days before being chased away. The families of these girls don’t know how to protest – if they did, they could be killed."

=== Labour and financial levies ===
Adults in the group's territory are forced to pay a 1,000 Congolese francs (US$0.60) protection tax per month. Adults and children are also forced to work in a practice the group dubs "community labour" (salongo). Men and boys in Masisi are forced to work for one or two days, and for their participation they are given a token known as a jeton. If a civilian is found to have no jetons on them and they are stopped by the NDC-R, they will kill that civilian.

=== Support from the army ===
Human Rights Watch has alleged that Congolese army units and its senior officers have been providing material and operational support to the NDC-R, though the Congolese army has denied this.
