= Nyatura =

Congolese Hutu militias

- Dates active: 2010–present
- Active regions: Primarily Masisi and Rutshuru Territories, North Kivu, Democratic Republic of the Congo
- Ideology: Anti-Rwanda; Anti-M23; Hutu interests
- Status: Active
- Size: Unknown- over 15 factions
- Wars: Kivu conflict: M23 campaign (2022–present)

The Nyatura (Kinyarwanda for “those who hit hard”), also known as Mai-Mai Nyatura, and officially called the Collective of Movements for Change, are a group of Congolese Hutu militias that operate in the Kivu region of the Congo.

== History ==
The Nyatura were first formed in 2010. Rather than being organized as a single group, they are a group of armed factions that often cooperate with other anti-Rwandan and anti-M23 elements in the region throughout the Kivu conflict. By late 2017, around 15 separate Nyatura factions were reported to be active, some part of coalitions with other armed groups, and some independent. Like many militias in the Kivu region, they have been employed by the Congolese military to fight against other anti-government and anti-Hutu groups in Kivu, while also having committed human rights abuses, including the recruitment of child soldiers and attacks on civilians and schools.

Each Nyatura faction is named after their commander. Some factions, like Nyatura-Domi and Nyatura-John Love, are in a coalition with the FDLR, a Hutu-dominated rebel group- the FDLR is believed to have trained them. Nyatura-Domi and Nyatura-John Love are believed to have 150 and 100 fighters, respectively. Others operated alongside the FARDC and other anti-M23 factions during the M23 rebellion from 2012 to 2013, with some Nyatura fighters being integrated into the FARDC during that time.
