= Mai-Mai =

Militia groups in the Democratic Republic of the Congo

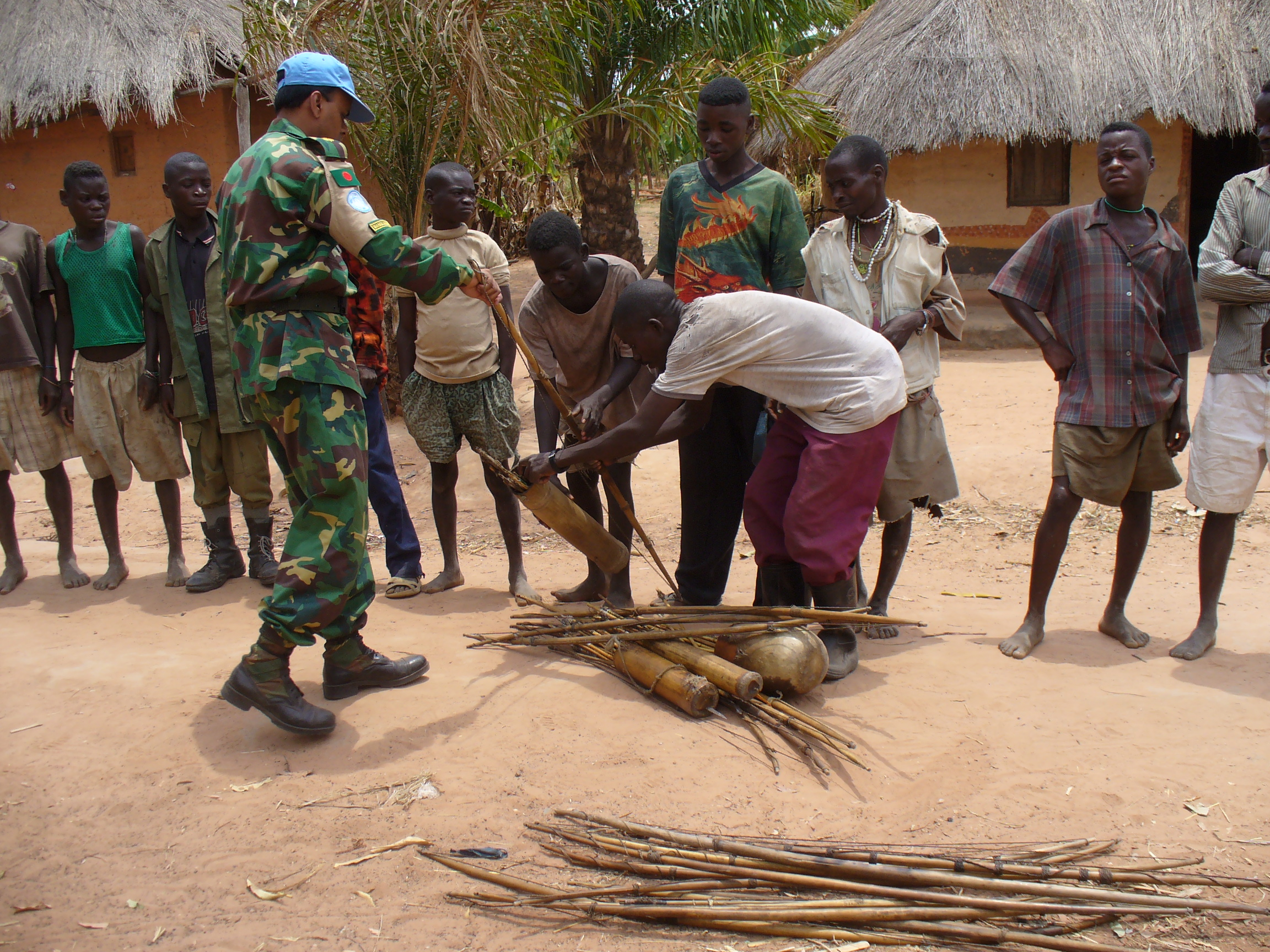
Mai-Mai fighters surrendering their weapons to United Nations personnel in Northern Katanga, 2006.

The term Mai-Mai or Mayi-Mayi refers to any kind of community-based militia group active in the Democratic Republic of the Congo (DRC) that is formed to defend local communities and territory against other armed groups. Most were formed to resist the invasion of Rwandan forces and Rwanda. Groups that fall under the umbrella term "Mai-Mai" include armed forces led by warlords, traditional tribal elders, village heads and politically motivated resistance fighters. Because Mai Mai have only the most tenuous internal cohesion, different Mai-Mai groups allied themselves with a variety of domestic and foreign government and guerrilla groups at different times. The term Mai-Mai refers not to any particular movement, affiliation or political objective but to a broad variety of groups.

The name comes from the Swahili word for water, maji. Militia members sprinkle themselves with water, and this ritual is believed to protect from bullets.

Mai-Mai were particularly active in the eastern Congolese provinces bordering Rwanda, North Kivu and South Kivu (the "Kivus"), which were under the control of the Rwanda-allied Banyamulenge-dominated rebel faction, the Congolese Rally for Democracy–Goma (RCD-Goma) during the Second Congo War. While militias have long been common in the Kivus, particularly among the minority Batembo and Babembe ethnic groups, the recent wars and conflicts caused large numbers of town dwellers to form Mai-Mai. Although the Mai-Mai, either as a group or as individual groups, were not party to the 1999 Lusaka Ceasefire Agreement, which was meant to end the Second Congo War, they remained one of the most powerful forces in the conflict, and the lack of co-operation from some groups has been problematic for the peace process.

== Mai-Mai in North and South Kivu ==
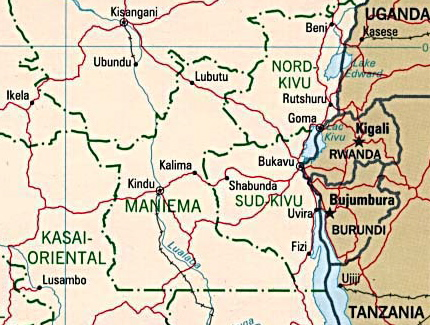
The East-central DRC, showing Kivu

According to a 2001 UN report, 20,000 to 30,000 Mai-Mai were active in the two Kivu provinces. The two most powerful and well-organized Mai-Mai groups in the Kivus were led by Generals Padiri and Dunia. Currently most active is a group which is called Mai-Mai Yakutumba, was organized in 2007 by General Yakutumba. They were reported to have received aid from the government of the Democratic Republic of Congo and are widely viewed by other Mai Mai groups as the leaders, though not the commanders, of the Kivu Mai-Mai. A number of smaller Mai-Mai groups, such as the Mudundu 40/Front de Résistance et de Défense du Kivu (FRDKI) and Mouvement de Lutte contre l'Agression au Zaïre/Forces Unies de Résistance Nationale contre l'Agression de la Républíque Démocratique du Congo (MLAZ/FURNAC), were reported to cooperate with the Rwandan military and Rally for Congolese Democracy–Goma (RCD-Goma).

Walikale and Masisi north of Goma were the centres of Mai-Mai activity in North Kivu. In South Kivu, there have historically been concentrations around Walungu and Bunyakiri south of Lake Kivu, around Uvira and Mwenaga at the northern end of Lake Tanganyika, further south around Fizi, and around Shabunda, between the Rwandan border and Kindu.

The Nduma Defense of Congo (or Mai-Mai Sheka) was formed in 2009 by former minerals trader Ntabo Ntaberi Sheka, an ethnic Nyanga. Sheka claims the group was formed to liberate the mines of Walikale Territory in North Kivu. The NDC are accused of a mass rape of at least 387 women, men, and children over a three-day span in Walikale in 2010.

== Mai-Mai in Katanga ==
A former leader of the Mai-Mai, Gédéon Kyungu Mutanga, turned himself over to MONUC troops in May 2006. He was found guilty of numerous war crimes between October 2003 and May 2006 and was sentenced to death by the Kipushi Military Tribunal in Katanga Province on 6 March 2009. He escaped from prison in September 2011 and formed the Mai-Mai Kata Katanga ("Secede Katanga").

Mai-Mai Gedeon is also commanded by Gedeon Kyungu Mutanga and loosely tied to his Mai-Mai Kata Katanga. The Corak Kata Katanga, also known as the Co-ordination for a Referendum on Self-determination for Katanga, is composed mainly of former Katanga Tigers, a separatist group active in the 1960s. They claim to be behind the attack on the Katanga airport in February 2011. It is unclear to what extent all these groups are co-ordinated.

== Other Mai-Mai groups ==
There was a large Mai-Mai presence in Maniema, in particular around Kindu and Kalemie. Province Orientale also hosts a number of Mai-Mai, but these groups were apparently involved in long-standing ethnic disputes.

== Mai-Mai in Virunga National Park ==
In May 2007, Mai-Mai killed two wildlife officers in Virunga National Park and threatened to kill mountain gorillas if the government retaliated. The Mai-Mai are also suspected of the killings of nine mountain gorillas, with the use of machetes, and automatic weapons. In an October 2012 incident, Mai-Mai killed two park staff and a soldier, while three soldiers were injured. From 1990 to 2018 some 170 Virunga Rangers have died in such attacks, according to the World Wildlife Foundation.

Six Virunga Park Rangers were killed in an ambush and a seventh ranger was injured in the Central section of the reserve on 10 January 2021. Officials suspected the Mai-Mai to be behind the attacks.

In June 2023, seven Virunga Park Rangers were killed by local Mai-Mai in the span of ten days.

== See also ==
- Resistance Patriots Maï-Maï
- Mai-Mai Kata Katanga
- Gédéon Kyungu Mutanga
