= Timeline of the ADF insurgency (2025) =

Timeline of the ADF insurgency in 2025

This timeline of the Allied Democratic Forces insurgency covers the ADF's militant activity in central and east Africa 2025.

== Background ==
Following the radicalization of its founding leader, Jamil Mukulu, the ADF was formed as a merger of several rebel groups (initially called ADF/NALU) in 1995. The ADF initially operated in western Uganda but has since, and currently continues to operate solely in the eastern DRC; this includes the North Kivu and Ituri Provinces.

The ADF's leadership shifted after the imprisonment of Mukulu on 30 April 2015. Musa Seka Baluku, Mukulu's second-in-command since the group's formation, stepped forward in his place shortly after. Under Baluku's leadership, the group made contact with the Islamic State (IS) as early as 2017, were formally recognized as a chapter of IS–Central Africa Province (IS-CAP) in 2018, and formally pledged their allegiance to the IS in 2019. By that year, the ADF had split, with one part remaining loyal to Mukulu and the other to Baluku; the latter renewed their allegiance to the IS in April 2022. Since joining IS-CAP, the ADF increasingly targeted civilians into their attacks.

In response to growing causalities at the hands of the ADF, the Congolese and Ugandan armed forces created a joint military force called Operation Shujaa in November 2021. The Operation's already mixed perception, due to views of Uganda's role in the Second Congo War, was further put into question regarding its effectiveness in actually preventing ADF attacks. According to BBC Monitoring, 90% of the IS' operations were carried out in Africa by September 2025, of which the ADF committed the second-highest number of civilian killings by a non-state actors globally in 2025, according to Armed Conflict Location and Event Data (ACLED).

== Pre-2025 events ==
Fighting along in Lubero Territory in December 2024 caused people to be displaced next December. The territory's civil society president, Samuel Kagheni, reportedly forced most individuals from the towns of Byambwe, Nziapanda, and Itenda to flee their homes at the beginning of the year.

== Timeline ==
=== January ===
January had a resurgence in ADF activities, particularly in Beni and Lubero Territories. On January 4, four bodies were found in a forest near Bwanasura village, with eight more found near Otmaber village in the Bandavilemba group on 5 January. Most of those killed were war veterans, with ADF rebels suspected to have killed them. According to Radio Okapi, the bodies were "already in an advanced state of decomposition" and were buried. On the night of the 5th, the ADF attacked the village of Loselose in Beni Territory, killing at least five civilians, with many others missing.

Visits to the region by military and political officials like MP Emil Saidi Balikwisha and UPDF Head, General Muhoozi Kainerugaba, between 7 and 9 January called for increased military presence in the Beni and Lubero territories. On 10 January, Humanitarian Coordinator in the DRC for the UN Office for the Coordination of Humanitarian Affairs (OCHA), Bruno Lemarquis, showed a "deep dismay" for the over 100,000 displaced since 1 January due to M23 clashes with the FARDC and attacks from the ADF, particularly condemning violence against civilians and humanitarian workers.

On 11 January, three farmers were killed and 12 others kidnapped in the farmlands around the Bapakome-Bakondo village by ADF rebels. Attackers also burned homes, with one of three killed being burned alive. The chief of the village pleaded for increased security presence the following day. Witnesses reported seeing ADF rebels occupying farmlands in Kipeyayo, Mawangose, and part of Lahe the afternoon of 11 January. On 15 January, ADF rebels perpetrated a massacre in Muhangi, killing 32 civilians with machetes. Several were injured and many went missing during the attack in Makoko, Masakoti, and Mambangu. Residents west of the Bulengya group reportedly gathered belongings and sought refuge in Vusamba, Musienene, Musimba, Kyambogho, Kimbulu, and the town of Butembo. Requests from Kinshasa and Kampala influenced UPDF forces to move from Butembo to Lubero Territory to respond to the increased ADF activity and 15 January attack, the increased presence, in turn, being said to have secured the region. Nevertheless, on 18 and 19 January, ADF rebels reportedly attacked villages in central Lubero, injuring civilians and inflicting material damage. On the night of 20 January, Municipal President of Ruwenzori commune in Beni, Clarisse Kavuho Kyamuthika, reported than in the previous 10 days, attacks from ADF rebels near Mikuha left three dead.

National MP Arsène Mwaka echoed calls from Balikwisha, Kainerugaba, and Kyamuthika on 21 January, commenting that joint forces should increase their presence from the south back to the north of Lubero, referencing the recent attacks and disappearances. Lemarquis reported on 22 January that over 200,000 displaced individuals had been displaced in North Kivu due to these attacks since June 2024. He and local sources believe that increased focus on M23 left security vacuums benefitting ADF rebels. Rwanda would defend the actions of the M23 Movement by accusing the DRC of ignoring the actions of ADF militants at the UN Security Council's meeting on 22 January.

ADF rebels were reportedly seen moving near the Batangi-Mbau axis, 25 kilometers from Beni. On 24 January, local sources from Beni Territory reported than in January, sixteen people were killed in attacks by the ADF, often burning homes in their assaults. On 27 January, ADF rebels executed two tandem attacks along the National Road 4 in the Walesse Vonkutu chiefdom. The first was in the forest near Mambelenga, where nine were killed and one was injured. The second was along the Mungamba-Ndimo axis, where three motocyclists were attacked, one being killed and the other two injured. Rebels set the motorcycles and cargo on fire. On 27 January, ADF rebels kidnapped four individuals from the village of Manjamba, Lubero.

On 27 January, DRC official Thérèse Kayikwamba Wagner made a requested for the UNSC to meet regarding the deteriorating situation in Goma. Although the report did not concern the ADF, Wagner reported that over 500,000 individuals had been displaced in North and South Kivu in January alone at the UN Security Council's meeting on 28 January, which included some ADF activity. Lemarquis commented on the worsening humanitarian situation, warning that many people will be killed and displaced. UNOCHA's spokesperson said Goma hospitals were overwhelmed and the World Food Program said it had temporarily paused food assistance.

On 30 January, ADF rebels attacked the towns of Katwakasoya, Mataha, and Ndalya in Irumu Territory, where ten, four, and one persons were killed respectively. However, fleeing and missing residents made death tolls inconclusive. The ADF ended the month with an attack on Lumba, located 35 kilometers northwest of Butembo, killing 12 civilians in multiple attacks throughout the day of 31 January. Several went missing and searches for bodies were dispatched.

On 31 January, Uganda announced the that it would adopt a forward defensive posture in the DRC, particularly in the Lubero Territory where it would join the few present FARDC positions focused on ADF rebels. Between 6 January and 12 February, the ADF also carried out attacks along National Road 4 and 10 kilometers west of thereof, in the villages of Israël, Kazaroho, Kimautu, Mongee, Kasoko, Apakou, and Apakola. Local witnesses and politicians reported that many people were killed and abducted, but could not yet be recovered due to ADF presence.

=== February ===
The beginning of February began with a spree of massacres. Between the 1st and 4th, over a hundred civilians were killed in southern Irumu, Ituri Province. These massacres concluded with multiple attacks on 4 February, where ADF rebels emerged from nearby forests in small groups and fired indiscriminately to create panic in southern Irumu and neighboring towns of Kangatiro, Butumai, and Lulueba in central Idohu. In Irumu, 9 civilians were found dead in fields, killed with knives. In another town nearby, ADF rebels killed 10 people, burned multiple homes, and looted buildings. Between 24 January and 2 February, local sources and survivors of ADF attacks reported that upwards of 121 residents were killed in Mutwanga and their homes looted. Many residents of the village fled by late February.

On 4 February, Uganda deployed over a thousand additional UPDF troops, bringing its total to around five thousand total, following its 31 January statement. Around forty vehicles carrying these troops were seen crossing the border into the DRC by local sources. The UPDF announced this deployment on 5 February. A meeting between FARDC and UPDF military officers deployed in both Ituri and North Kivu provinces was scheduled for 12 February in Boga. Around this time, three fatal incidents between Mayi-Safi and Mama-Neema were recorded, where IEDs detonated along roads. Local sources believe they were planted by the ADF. On 7 February, ADF rebels raided various Christian villages and killed residents in North Kivu and Ituri Provinces On 10 February, three civilians were killed in the Luna-Samboko village in Ituri, near Beni.

The FARDC reinsured populations in Ituri to continue about their daily business on the 17th, noting the early February arrival of additional Ugandan troops. The UPDF and FARDC would begin discussions in Bunia, Ituri Province, about pooling resources in this southern part of the province. Local residents, however, remained skeptical about motivations considering the precarious situation between the DRC and Rwanda, which was discussed at the UN Security Council's meeting following M23 massacres in Bukavu, North Kivu. This was also born from a Twitter post published that day by Ugandan President Museveni's son, Lieutenant General Muhoozi Kainerugaba, threatening to attack and take control of Bunia if "all forces" there did not lay down their arms. Kainerugaba's desire was speculated to be linked to his 11 February post claiming that the Bahema ethnic group was being killed. Furthermore, Kainerugaba has expressed an outspoken support for Rwandan President Paul Kagame, who himself has claimed no link between the M23 and Rwanda, and called M23 fighters "brothers of ours" regarding rights for Congolese Tutsis.

On 18 February, along the 72-kilometer Eringeti-Kainama road, in the Lese farmlands, a farmer stepped on an IED, causing injuries which he succumbed to in the Beni General Hospital. Local sources believed the explosive was placed by ADF troops, considering militants had been seen crossing this road and others nearby. On 21 February, Museveni publicly commented that the UPDF's deployment in the DRC, as Ugandan troops were present in Bunia, was solely to fight the ADF, and not to combat M23 rebels. On 24 February, the Walese Vonkutu chiefdom in the southern Irumu territory, Ituri, reported that upwards of 70 people were killed by the ADF since the beginning of the year. It also reported that numerous homes had been burned and systematically looted, hindering local populations from performing their "agricultural activities." Security was especially weak around the Komanda-Luna region. The ADF reportedly occupied ten localities in the area, including Bandiangu, Bandavilemba, Bokutchu, and Bavokutchu. The same day, local sources in Bapere reported suspected the ADF of robbing over nine hundred animals from multiple farmers—further disrupting farmers who already feared for security in the area, which they claimed was ADF-occupied.

Around 25 February, farmers in Bwanasula, Kidepo, Machongani, Apende, Ndalya, Samboko, Mutweyi, Masongo, Mambelenga, and Ndimbo claimed to fear for their lives following clashes between the FARDC and ADF. The FARDC had military barriers placed in many of these villages. Farmers reported being harassed by both the military and the ADF. On 28 February, a briefing by UN official Stéphane Dujarric noted the increase in ADF attacks. Based on reports from local sources, the ADF killed 23 civilians and kidnapped others in numerous villages in Ituri between 25 and 26 February. That day, 26 February, 17 civilians were killed in Beni territory. On 27 February, local sources reported that around 30,000 displaced households had been without assistance for upwards of four years, fleeing atrocities primarily perpetrated by the ADF. Most came from the Walese Vonkutu and the Mambasa territories, and some others from North Kivu. They believed that these areas were the epicenter of ADF activity, which forced many households to leave and many others not to have access to their fields.

=== March ===
On 22 March, it was reported that Ugandan intelligence indicated an alliance pact between the Cooperative for the Development of Congo (CODECO) Lendu militant rebels and the ADF. This was a notably surprising event considering the ADF have historically not worked with another other groups, other rebels included.

=== April ===
Between 31 March and 1 April, Thomas Lubanga, native of the Ituri Province, announced that a new political and militant rebel group had formed in Ituri, called the Convention for the Popular Revolution (CPL). Lubanga was convicted of recruiting child soldiers, an internationally recognized war crime (Note: As set out by the International Criminal Court's Rome Statute, (Article 8, section a, subsection xxvi) stating that "conscripting or enlisting children under the age of fifteen years into the national armed forces or using them to participate actively in hostilities" is a war crime.) by the International Criminal Court (ICC), in 2012, but was released and appointment as an peacemaking task force emissary in Ituri by Congolese president Félix Tshisekedi in 2020. In 2022, he was captured by a rebel group for approximately 2 months, after which he sought refuge in Kampala. Lubanga reported that armed militants were present in three areas of the province. The number of fighters Lubanga controlled was unclear. It is believed that this development could bring further instability in the region as FARDC, UPDF, and Joint Operation Shujaa forces deal with unrelenting ADF attacks and major M23 advances. Furthermore, former Ugandan funding for Lubanga's Union of Congolese Patriots (UPC) during the UPC's military interventions in the Second Congo War could complicate their involvement in the region. The CPL launched its first offensives in the early weeks of August 2025, during which 18 people were caught between heavy gunfire and killed.

ADF rebels attacked the Mambasa, Ituri mining area 5km off of the PK23 road during the night between 5 and 6 April. Rebels attacked farmers with machetes and light arms, killing three and injuring others. They were seen escaping with hostages. Civilians in the peripheries moved into Mambasa-centre and Mayuano, both of which were reportedly secured by local police forces. The CRDH claims local populations alerted authorities of rebel presence in the area a month prior, but no security was provided. Territorial secretary and human rights advocate claimed ADF rebels set up tents in Mendimendi and Mandondo for the sake of establishing a camp or stronghold. On 9 April, 21 RPG-7 rockets were destroyed in the town of Boga, Irumu Territory, Ituri by the demining Africa for Mine Action (AFRILAM) NGO. They were identified to have been buried for over a year near an FARDC camp within Boga. AFRILAM urged citizens to watch for more explosives as they were in the areas and others nearby when the ADF were active.

=== June ===
On 4 June, two people, including a suicide bomber, were killed near a Roman Catholic shrine in Kampala, on Uganda Martyrs' Day. Uganda police attributed the bombing to the ADF.

=== July ===
Joint Operation Shujaa forces reportedly began launching precision strikes and heavy artillery shells at the infamous Madina camp on the morning of 6 July. On 10 July, the UPDF claimed to have captured the ADF's primary camp, located in Apakwang, Ituri Province, at the time. It was believed to have hosted between 1,000 and 1,500 fighters and dependents, which had consolidated six other camps into its structure in 2024. Col. Chris Magezi, assistant to the Chief of Defence Forces, Gen. Muhoozi Kainerugaba, said that joint forces were in pursuit of fleeing ADF rebels, which moved westwards. Although the attack was said to be a landmark achievement in Operation Shujaa, ADF rebels mostly managed to escape. No casualty or capture numbers were published. Joint forces' pursuit also aimed to search for hostages and better understand the ADF's logistical systems, physical and not. The Armed Conflict Location and Event Data (ACLED) NGO's August report believed that the success of this operation could be attributed to the increased UPDF troop deployments. The same report found that the most active ADF cell in 2025 was under the Commander Ahmad Mahmood Hassan. The ADF perpetrated the Komanda massacre on 27 July, when rebels arriving from Mount Hoyo, likely led by Commander Seka Umaru, killed 43 civilians in the Saint Anuarite Catholic church.

=== August ===
Three people were killed by ADF militants in Idohu on 2 August. The FARDC responded to notifications from local residents and a clash with rebels and the armed forces ensued. Bodies were recovered in the Walesse Vonkutu chiefdom. Searches for more bodies continued on nearby Israel Mountain. Suspected ADF rebels attacked a vehicle travelling from Butembo to Bunia, about 20 kilometers from Eringeti, on a road between the two cities on 9 August. Attackers set fire to the vehicle and took hostages. FARDC and UPDF joint forces deployed shortly after trying to recover hostage and ensure safety on the passage. Nine hostages were recovered by Operation Shujaa troops the following day, 10 August, with seven hostages still held by ADF rebels. At least 30 people were killed on 15 August by suspected ADF elements in Bapere, North Kivu. Two days later, on 17 August, at least nine people, including eight civilians and one police officer, are killed in Oicha, Beni by ADF rebels during the night. They were suspectedly killed with knives.

=== September ===
On 8 September, ADF militants perpetrated the Ntoyo massacre. In early September, a group of national deputies filed a petition to impeach several members of both parliamentary houses, including Assembly President Vital Kamerhe and Senate president Jean-Michel Sama Lukonde. It was led by current Union for Democracy and Social Progress (UDPS) and former Union for the Congolese Nation (UNC) member, Crispin Mbidule. On 15 September, the petition was submitted with 262 signatures. The following day, 16 September, Epenge followed up on the discussions by accusing the ruling parliamentary party, the Sacred Union of the Nation, of neglecting Congolese citizens massacred and abducted by ADF rebels in the eastern Congo among other issues.

== Analysis ==
In December, the Foundation for Defense of Democracies' Long War Journal reported upwards of 967 civilians were killed in 2025, "with most, if not all, of the victims being Christian villagers." ACLED included both civilians and combatants in its figure of at least 1,370 fatalities by the ADF, surpassing M23.
