= 2017 CNPSC offensive =

- Part of the Kivu Conflict
Date	1 June 2017 – 26 December 2017 (6 months, 3 weeks and 4 days)
Location	South Kivu, DRC
Result	Military stalemate: Some towns remain under CNPSC control; FARDC counter-offensive starting in December

Belligerents
CNPSC	Democratic Republic of the Congo (United Nations) MONUSCO; Ngumino

Commanders and leaders
William Yakutumba (CNPSC chairman); Ebu Ela Kitungano (Mai-Mai Ebu Ela commander); Sheh Assani Mitende (Mai-Mai Malaika commander); René Itongwa (Mai-Mai René commander); Réunion Warusasa (Mai-Mai Réunion commander); Christophe Mukua Aigle (Mai-Mai Aigle commander)	(Democratic Republic of the Congo) Didier Etumba (FARDC chief) (Democratic Republic of the Congo) Gaetan Kakudji Bobo (33rd Military Region commander) (Democratic Republic of the Congo) Maoro Ruterera (FARDC unit commander) (Democratic Republic of the Congo) Samy Matumo (FARDC unit commander)

Casualties and losses
6+ killed	80+ killed
- 80,000+ displaced

The 2017 CNPSC offensive was a military offensive launched by rebels of the National Coalition of the People for the Sovereignty of Congo (CNPSC) on 30 June 2017 against security forces of the Democratic Republic of the Congo and MONUSCO. The goal of the offensive was to capture major settlements, mainly in South Kivu province in order to raise support for a popular uprising against then-president Joseph Kabila, who the coalition had deemed as an illegitimate president.

The offensive culminated in the Battle of Uvira in which rebels attempted to capture the major city, but were eventually pushed out by state security forces. The offensive continued after the battle, but then ended as a counter offensive by the FARDC began in December.

== Background ==
The CNPSC coalition was brokered by William Yakutumba, a prominent Mai-Mai commander involved in armed rebellion since the 1990s. It unified around 12 Mai-Mai groups into a coalition, aimed at removing the government of Joseph Kabila, who had delayed scheduled elections in late 2016. The idea of the coalition had been around since about 2013, but only became in existence after Kabila's electoral delay. Several armed groups came to be prominent in the group, notably Yakutumba's PARC-FAAL, the Mai-Mai Malaika, and the Uvira hills-based Mai-Mai groups of René Itongwa, Réunion Warusasa, and several others.

== The Offensive ==
=== June ===
1 June

The offensive began with rebel forces of Yakutumba's group attacking Force Bendera, the site of a hydroelectric dam in Tanganyika Province. CNPSC forces stormed the area, which was protected by elements of the FARDC, in an attempt to secure weapons. Two FARDC soldiers were killed in the attack, and the rebel forces made off with a large stash of arms and ammunition.

30 June

On June 30, Congolese Independence Day, the coalition was announced by Yakutumba, who stated his intention to overthrow Joseph Kabila's government, which he called illegitimate. The same day, the coalition attacked and captured the localities of Lulimba, Misisi, Lubondja, and Iseke.

=== July ===
1 July

Heavy fighting erupted south of Fizi town, with the CNPSC occupying several localities. The FARDC claimed that they had the situation under control, and locals stated that they had seen an increased presence of FARDC troops in Fizi town.

3 July

The FARDC reported that they had recaptured some localities under CNPSC control south of the mining town of Misisi in Fizi Territory.

4 July

The CNPSC announced their intention to take the city of Kindu, the capital of Maniema province. In response, the Canadian mining company Banro Corporation announced an evacuation of all personnel from the province, citing security issues and harassment by CNPSC-affiliated militias.

12 July

On July 12, the United Nations estimated that 80,000 people were internally displaced as a result of the fighting between the coalition and government in Fizi Territory. The same day, CNPSC forces ambushed a FARDC convoy from Namoya to Wamaza.

26 July

Armed men likely belonging to a CNPSC militia ambushed a group of FARDC reinforcements travelling from Maniema to Fizi. Three soldiers were killed in the ambush.

=== August ===
7 August

Fighting erupted between the CNPSC and the FARDC in the localities of Kikonde and Kasandjala in Uvira Territory. According to local sources, thirteen FARDC were wounded in the clashes, which continued through August 10.

9 August

FARDC positions in Kabambare were attacked by forces of the Mai-Mai Malaika group of the coalition on August 9.

10 August

It was reported that several waves of displaced people from Uvira Territory had fled to neighboring Burundi.

13 August

Fighting was reported between CNPSC forces and elements of a Banyamulenge militia called the Ngumino. Three civilians were reportedly killed in the crossfire.

=== September ===
9 September

CNPSC naval forces attacked a FARDC naval base in Baraka. No one was reported killed or injured.

11 September

The rebels attacked the locality of Kilembwe in Fizi and captured it from the FARDC.

13 September

FARDC forces under Colonel Maoro Ruterera recaptured Kilembwe after two days of heavy fighting with CNPSC forces.

20 September

In Maniema, CNPSC forces attacked a FARDC position in Pende-Mende. After heavy clashes, the position was captured by the rebels.

22 September

CNPSC forces fired on a MONUSCO helicopter. The helicopter was hit in a tire and its fuel tank, but safely made it to Baraka for repairs.

23 September

The CNPSC attacked the city of Wamaza on September 23. The town was captured after a series of clashes, continuing the coalition's advance towards Kindu. It was also reported that some from the Barega community of Shabunda reportedly joined the CNPSC after this development.

24 September

Fighting erupted between the FARDC, under the command of Colonel Samy Matumo, and CNPSC in and around the town of Mboko as rebel forces under René Itongwa, supported by Ebu Ela Kitungano, attacked the town. After several skirmishes, the rebels, to their own surprise, captured the town.

27 September

After progressing through the towns of Swima and Makobola, CNPSC forces reached the hills about 5 km away from Uvira town. The rebels advanced towards the town and fighting began at around 5 am local time. FARDC forces defending the city were quickly overran by the rebels, who captured parts of the city and took its port. Eventually, the initial incursion was repelled by joint FARDC-MONUSCO forces.

28 September

A second attack was launched on Uvira the next day, mainly led by CNPSC naval forces. Land forces attacked at 5 am, alongside four boats of the CNPSC's naval wing. MONUSCO helicopters attacked the boats, destroying several, ending the second attack. The same day, CNPSC forces clashed with the FARDC in Kasongo.

=== October ===
3 October

After heavy fighting, newly arrived FARDC reinforcements pushed CNPSC forces around 35 km from Uvira, and recaptured Mboko from the militia. In a Twitter statement, the CNPSC claimed they had withdrawn from Mboko voluntarily, "to prioritize peace".

11 October

The village of Mukera was recaptured by FARDC forces after a series of skirmishes with CNPSC troops. CNPSC spokesman Dalton Waubwela Mwila claimed that a FARDC soldier was captured in the fighting.

=== November ===
19 November

CNPSC forces attacked the town of Kilembwe, in Fizi Territory. Forces of the Malaika and Yakutumba groups attacked the city and killed one FARDC soldier before the rest of the garrison pulled out. According to the FARDC, the withdrawal was to "avoid the bloodbath".

28 November

The FARDC recaptured Kilembwe from CNPSC forces. It was reported that the FARDC encountered no resistance when capturing the town.

=== December ===
23 December

Militiamen of the CNPSC shot and killed a FARDC soldier in the village of Kikwena.

26 December

General Philemon Yav was selected to become the commander of the Sukola II operation, and would lead military operations against the CNPSC. This date is generally accepted as when the offensive ended, as a large-scale FARDC counter-offensive launched by Yav would begin in the following weeks.

== Aftermath ==
Following Philemon Yav's appointment as overall commander of Sukola II, the FARDC began a major offensive against the CNPSC rebels which was intended to destroy the group. Heavy losses were inflicted against the group, mainly against Yakutumba's Mai-Mai militia, and the group was falsely labeled as "annihilated" by the army. In late 2018, another CNPSC offensive would be launched.

Towards the end of the offensive, FARDC forces targeted Bembe civilians, who they believed to be CNPSC rebels. Arbitrary arrests of Bembes, specifically young adults, were carried out in Baraka and Uvira. This harassment led to a recruitment spike for the coalition.
