= 2017 Uvira clashes =

2017 Uvira Clashes
- Part of the Kivu conflict and the 2017 CNPSC offensive
Date	27–28 September 2017
Location	Uvira, Democratic Republic of the Congo
Result	Congolese government victory: CNPSC withdraws from Uvira

Belligerents
Democratic Republic of the Congo (United Nations) MONUSCO	CNPSC

Commanders and leaders
(Democratic Republic of the Congo) Gaetan Kakudji Bobo (33rd Military Region commander)	William Yakutumba (CNPSC chairman); Ebu Ela Kitungano (Mai-Mai Ebu Ela commander); Saidi Ekanda (CNPSC naval commander); René Itongwa (Mai-Mai René commander)

Casualties and losses
13 soldiers killed 1 peacekeeper killed	1 fighter killed At least 1 boat sunk

The 2017 Uvira clashes were a series of skirmishes between the National Coalition of the People for the Sovereignty of Congo (CNPSC) and the Armed Forces of the Democratic Republic of the Congo (FARDC) supported by United Nations MONUSCO peacekeepers in and around the city of Uvira, in the South Kivu province of the Democratic Republic of the Congo. The clashes were a result of the CNPSC coalition's rebellion that began several months earlier, in which the coalition declared its intent to capture the city.

== Background ==
The CNPSC coalition began a rebellion in 2017 after anticipated elections did not take place in the DRC. William Yakutumba, the coalition's leader, declared his intent to remove President Joseph Kabila from power via armed force. Uvira is the second-largest city in South Kivu, the main province where the coalition is based. The CNPSC had also previously stated their intentions to capture the city as part of their wider campaign to challenge the government. After scoring victories against the government in June and the months after, the CNPSC coalition would continue their momentum and advance on Uvira on September 27.

== Clashes ==
In the early morning of September 27, CNPSC forces under Ebu Ela Kitungano and René Itongwa advanced to positions 5 km outside of the city. Clashes with government forces erupted at 5 am, and continued throughout the day as rebel forces continued to move on the city. At around 3 pm, CNPSC forces entered Uvira, and heavy fighting erupted, with rebel forces briefly capturing Uvira's port. FARDC forces were reportedly overrun, but with the support of MONUSCO, eventually repelled the incursion.

Fighting continued at 5 am the next day, coinciding with a naval raid carried out by boats under the command of Saidi Ekanda. Government naval forces battled the CNPSC's boats for several hours, sinking one. MONUSCO mobilized attack helicopters to assist in fending off the attack. Within several hours, rebel forces were pushed back south, officially ending the clashes.

== Aftermath ==
After the attack, a large CNPSC meeting was held in Kazimia, the coalition's main headquarters until 2018. The meeting was used to discuss further collaboration within the coalition, as well as how the group would be structured. Additionally, the FARDC would launch an offensive in retaliation to this attack and the CNPSC's previous incursions, which would damage the coalition temporarily.

== See also ==
- Mai-Mai
- National Coalition of the People for the Sovereignty of Congo
