= Komanda massacre =

2025 rebel attack in the DR Congo

- Part of the Kivu conflict and the ADF insurgency
- Komanda (Democratic Republic of the Congo) Location of Komanda within the Ituri Province, Democratic Republic of the Congo
- Native name: Massacre de Komanda, Mauaji ya Komanda
- Location: 1°21′44.31″N 29°46′38.58″E; Komanda, Ituri Province, Democratic Republic of the Congo
- Date: 27 July 2025; ~01:00 a.m. CAT (UTC+02:00)
- Target: Saint Anuarite Catholic church and the town of Komanda
- Attack type: Mass murder, mass shooting, massacre
- Weapons: Light arms, machetes
- Deaths: 43-50 civilians (including 19 women, 15 men, and 9 children)
- Injuries: 13 civilians
- Victims: 12-14 civilians missing Thousands of civilians displaced
- Perpetrators: Islamic State; IS-CAP; ADF-Baluku

The Komanda massacre (French: Massacre de Komanda, Swahili: Mauaji ya Komanda) occurred on 27 July 2025, when Islamic State-affiliated (IS) Allied Democratic Forces (ADF-Baluku) rebels attacked the Saint Anuarite Catholic church in Komanda, Zunguluka district, Irumu Territory in central Ituri Province, Democratic Republic of the Congo (DRC). The attack occurred in the middle of the night, during which ADF rebels targeted a night vigil. Between 43 and 50 Congolese civilians were killed, with credible estimates listing 43 deaths, including 19 women, 15 men, and nine children. (Note: Some initial reports claimed higher death counts including the United Nations and Prensa Latina. Others reported the correct number of deaths including Al Jazeera, Reuters, MONUSCO, TRT World, a later United Nations release, and ACLED.)

The attack drew significant domestic and international attention, including statements coming from Pope Leo XIV, the Episcopal Conference of the Democratic Republic of the Congo (CENCO), the United Nations' (UN) peacekeeping force in the DRC (MONUSCO), the UN Security Council (UNSC), and others. The DRC's armed forces (FARDC) and MONUSCO were rapidly deployed to the town to maintain security, aid in burying deceased victims of the attacks, and provide medical support.

== Background ==
Following the radicalization of its founding leader, Jamil Mukulu, the ADF was formed as a merger of several rebel groups (initially called ADF/NALU) in 1995. The ADF initially operated in western Uganda but has since, and currently continues to operate solely in the eastern DRC; this includes the North Kivu and Ituri Provinces.

The ADF's leadership shifted after the imprisonment of Mukulu on 30 April 2015. Musa Seka Baluku, Mukulu's second-in-command since the group's formation, stepped forward in his place shortly after. Under Baluku's leadership, the group made contact with the Islamic State (IS) as early as 2017, were formally recognized as a chapter of IS–Central Africa Province (IS-CAP) in 2018, and formally pledged their allegiance to the IS in 2019. By that year, the ADF had split, with one part remaining loyal to Mukulu and the other to Baluku; the latter renewed their allegiance to the IS in April 2022. Since joining IS-CAP, the ADF increasingly targeted civilians into their attacks.

In response to growing causalities at the hands of the ADF, the Congolese and Ugandan armed forces created a joint military force called Operation Shujaa in November 2021. The Operation's already mixed perception, due to views of Uganda's role in the Second Congo War, was further put into question regarding its effectiveness in actually preventing ADF attacks. According to BBC Monitoring, 90% of the IS' operations were carried out in Africa by September 2025, of which the ADF committed the second-highest number of civilian killings by a non-state actors globally in 2025, according to Armed Conflict Location and Event Data (ACLED).

=== Motives and premonitions of violence ===
July was a particularly bloody month for killings at the hands of ADF militants. Prior to the massacre, 30 incidents of violence were recorded around Komanda, 15 of which were claimed by the ADF. Earlier in the month, the ADF had perpetrated the killings of 82 or more civilians throughout Ituri and North Kivu. In response, UPDF forces of Operation Shujaa executed a bombing pressure campaign in the forests of Mambasa and along the axis towards Komanda.

The motive for the attack is ultimately unclear, but is believed to stem from retaliatory efforts in response to the escalated bombing campaign led by the joint forces of Operation Shujaa. Lieutenant Jules Ngongo, the Congolese army's spokesman for the Ituri province, believed the attack was intended to divert attention from the increased efforts of the army. Onesphore Sematumba, a Congo analyst at the International Crisis Group, instead argued that "these joint operations have only succeeded in dispersing the ADF without really protecting civilians from their wrathful reprisals" and believes that "the ADF is taking more or less the advantage of the Congolese army's and international diplomacy's focus on the M23 further south without attracting too much attention."

The Saint Anuarite church (French: Paroisse Bienheureuse Anuarite de Komanda, Swahili: Heri Anuarite Parokia ya Komanda), a parish of the Catholic Church, reportedly sent a request in June 2025 to local authorities for protection from possible attacks during church activities. MONUSCO itself published a press release days before the massacre, on 23 July, condemning the resurgence of ADF attacks. Similarly, the United States Embassy located in Kinshasa specifically warned of terrorist attacks in places of worship on 20 July. Despite these warnings, local forces did not act on the church's request and neither MONUSCO, the FARDC, nor those local authorities intervened during the attack.

== Massacre ==
The Saint Anuarite church was holding a night vigil for its 25th anniversary prior to the attack where some 100 individuals were present. Some in attendance were preparing for their confirmation. Individuals were present at the church multiple days prior to the attack.

Location of the Saint Anuarite church on the eastern side of the town of Komanda and Mount Hoyo

It is believed that the rebel cell perpetrating the massacre travelled from a stronghold located in Mount Hoyo, a mountain located southeast of Komanda; the stronghold's position was estimated to be approximately 12 kilometers from Komanda. The directionality of the attack likely indicated that it was led by Commander Seka Umaru, Musa Baluku's second-in-command. The attack began around 1:00 a.m. local time between the night of 26 July and morning of 27 July, when ADF forces stormed the church. After rounding up dozens of churchgoers, rebels executed 20 individuals with machetes and others with light firearms. (Note: Experts Caleb Weiss & Ryan O'Farrell, writing for the Foundation for Defense of Democracies' Long War Journal reported, however, that 40 individuals were killed within the church.) However, others present at the vigil were able to escape into the surrounding forest, between twelve and fourteen of which went missing according to a local chaplain and other witnesses. One survivor from inside the church told Human Rights Watch (HRW):

They told us to sit down, and then started hitting people [with blunt instruments] on the back of the neck. They killed two people I didn't know, and that's when I decided to flee with four others...We managed to run away – they shot at us but didn't hit us.

Following the massacre within the church, rebels proceeded to burn stores and homes, particularly near the Congo General Savings Bank (CADECO), which the Irumu civil society said caused "enormous damage." Some victims were found to have been burned inside vehicles and buildings. One man was found charred inside of his truck, which the ADF had set ablaze. A total of five individuals were killed in the attack on Komanda town generally. In addition, several children between the ages of 12 and 14 were kidnapped. Since then, some of those kidnapped have managed to escape.

The alarm about the attack was raised around 2:00 a.m., however, all ADF rebels were able to escape prior to the arrival of security forces. It was later reported that network issues slowed the alarm's sounding and response time.

== Aftermath and reactions ==
The IS-aligned ADF-Baluku faction would claim credit for the attack later on July 28 through Telegram. They specifically claimed that 45 churchgoers were killed in the attack, in addition to touting having burned shops and homes within the town of Komanda.

The region in the Komanda vicinity had been in relative peace months prior to the massacre, with many displaced civilians having returned. The day after the attack, however, virtually all daily activity in Komanda ceased once again, followed by an exodus of thousands of its residents joining other internally displaced persons (IDPs) fleeing from the nearby neighborhoods considered vulnerable including Base, Zunguluka, Umoja, and Ngombenyama. They joined the 20,000 to 30,000 individuals in Ituri had been displaced or were fleeing in response to the attack and other regional instability, primarily attributed to ADF and Cooperative for the Development of the Congo (CODECO) attacks. These IDPs were predominantly headed towards the cities of Kisangani and Bunia.

=== Domestic ===
The opposition candidate, Moïse Katumbi of the Together for the Republic party, responded to the Komanda massacre in a Twitter post, criticizing the "total absence of Kinshasa's power in the area under its control, particularly in the eastern part of the Republic." He cited illicit and self-interested motivations as cause for the government's poor response.

=== Religious institutions ===
Pope Leo XIV stated on 28 July 2025: "may the blood of these martyrs become a seed of peace, reconciliation, fraternity, and love for the Congolese people." President of the CENCO, archbishop Marcel Utembi Tapa, received the Pope's comments from Cardinal Pietro Parolin via Telegram, reading: "His Holiness Pope Leo XIV learned with dismay and deep sorrow of the attack perpetrated against the Parish of Blessed Anuarite in Komanda, which caused the death of several faithful gathered for worship." According to Vatican News, "the Pope also extended his Apostolic Blessing to the Parish of Blessed Anuarite, to the grieving families, the faithful of the DRC, and the entire nation, offering comfort amid their anguish." The Pope later again expressed "deep sorrow" regarding the attack on the churchgoers of the Saint Anuarite Catholic church. He prayed for the victims during his weekly Wednesday audience in St. Peter's Square, during which he stated the following in his appeal:

I renew my deep sorrow for the brutal terrorist attack that occurred during the night between 26 and 27 July in Komanda, in the eastern part of the Democratic Republic of the Congo, where over 40 Christians were killed in a church during a prayer vigil, and in their own homes. As I entrust the victims to God's loving Mercy, I pray for the wounded and for Christians around the world who continue to suffer violence and persecution. I urge those with local and international responsibility, to work together in order to prevent such tragedies.

Other religious organizations have echoed the pope's comments. The CENCO called the attack an "odious massacre," in addition to expressing concern over security forces' failure to identify the ADF militants in the Mount Hoyo stronghold prior to the massacre. Especially with the area being under what it called a "siege," CENCO argued this may have factored into the massacre being successfully carried out. The World Council of Churches (WCC) called it "a tragic and unacceptable act of violence against innocent worshippers gathered in prayer."

=== Military and intergovernmental organizations ===
The FARDC and MONUSCO both denounced the attack. The UN jointly supported MONUSCO's condemnation which expressed a "deep outrage at these heinous acts of violence, which constitute serious violations of international humanitarian law and infringements on human rights." The UNSC released a press release on 7 August 2025, issued by Council President Eloy Alfaro de Alba, "expressed their deepest condolences to the families of the victims and to the Government of the Democratic Republic of the Congo and wished a swift recovery to those injured."

The FARDC and UPDF increased military presence in the Komanda center to track down rebels in their joint Operation Shujaa efforts. Congolese forces were reportedly deployed three kilometers and MONUSCO one kilometer south of the church. In a press release, MONUSCO pledged to provide aid to local authorities with burials and medical aid, which they followed through with; locals conducted mass burials with the aid of MONUSCO-provided excavator. It also stated that it has "intensified its security efforts in and around Komanda by increasing the frequency of patrols in the area." The FARDC, local Congolese National Police (PNC), and MONUSCO all participated in these patrols. On 29 July, joint security forces were fired at by suspected Patriotic and Integrationist Force of Congo (FPIC) militia fighters in the Baiti neighborhood which was condemned by local authorities and youth representatives alike. The pressure pushed ADF militants near Komanda towards the neighboring territory of Mambasa, which joint Operation Shujaa forces agreed to extend their operations into.

A public information officer within the MONUSCO rapid deployable battalion based in Komanda told Human Rights Watch (HRW) that "the ADF is known to employ silent killer tactics, striking swiftly, organized and unpredictable. In this case, the attack occurred in the early hours of the morning, targeting a religious gathering attended by a large number of civilians' and that MONUSCO had taken steps to 'intensify protection efforts in the area.'" A military source within the FARDC told HRW that a "military justice instigation" had been opened and that further troops were deployed in the region for civilian security.

According to Radio Okapi, Jacques Anayeyi, president of the Irumu Territorial Youth Council, "welcomed these security efforts but deplored the political exploitation of the situation" and "accused certain political actors of manipulating a section of the youth to fuel hostility against MONUSCO, thus endangering security cohesion. 'Some politicians are taking advantage of the situation to stir up rejection of MONUSCO,' he said."

=== International ===
Numerous international governments expressed their condolences. France's foreign ministry expressed condolence to victims' families, solidarity with the Congolese government, and called for militants to lay down their arms. Belgium's prime minister, Maxime Prévot, condemned the violence and called for militants to lay down their arms.

=== Human Rights organizations ===
Human Rights Watch encouraged the FARDC and MONUSCO to "urgently" complete its investigation and publish its findings. Furthermore, it argued that the military organization should reestablish trust with civilians to receive notice of militant activities and other protection needs. It underscored the need to have quicker response times and to find and hold ADF militants accountable. Citing Operation Shujaa not curbing violence in North Kivu and Ituri, HRW called for the African Union (AU) and UNSC to build a "credible strategy to address the deepening security crisis and grave rights abuses." It extended a similar recommendation to President of the DRC, Félix Tshisekedi, specifically through "tighter military oversight" to avoid further atrocities as the government "has a duty to protect civilians and ensure justice for victims of these repeated atrocities."

The US-based Human Rights Research Center (HRRC) also condemned the attack, calling it "barbaric" and a "blatant violation of international humanitarian law" which required accountability and further security guarantees.

== Analysis ==
=== Targeting of Christians and community involvement ===
The US-based Middle East Media Research Institute cited the Komanda massacre, and particularly the imagery of the slaughter of Christian civilians released by the ADF, to argue that a "silent genocide" was occurring against Christians in central and southern Africa. (Note: The MEMRI report published to Fox News was contributed to by the Associated Press.)

Reagan Miviri, a researcher at Ebuteli, argued that the ADF militant's visible preparedness when entering the village raised questions about whether local complicity was present prior to the massacre.

=== Shortcomings of Operation Shujaa ===
The widespread international response to the massacre again drew into question the effectiveness of Operation Shujaa, which according to a report by a UN Group of Experts did not respond adequately to the active, violent ADF cells in northwest Lubero. In spite of US sanctions against the ADF being in place since 2014, the UN Group and other human rights organizations furthermore argued that the ADF was taking advantage of the March 23 Movement's (M23) insurgency in North and South Kivu. A senior research at HRW, Clémentine de Montjoye, added that the massacre "highlight[ed] the insecurity in eastern Congo" and argued there was a "need the Congolese government to urgently step up efforts to protect civilians and hold those responsible to account." The HRRC furthermore argued that "strong international assistance" was needed.
