= Kivu conflict =

Conflict in the Democratic Republic of the Congo

- Part of the Congolese Civil Wars, the aftermath of the Second Congo War and the war against the Islamic State
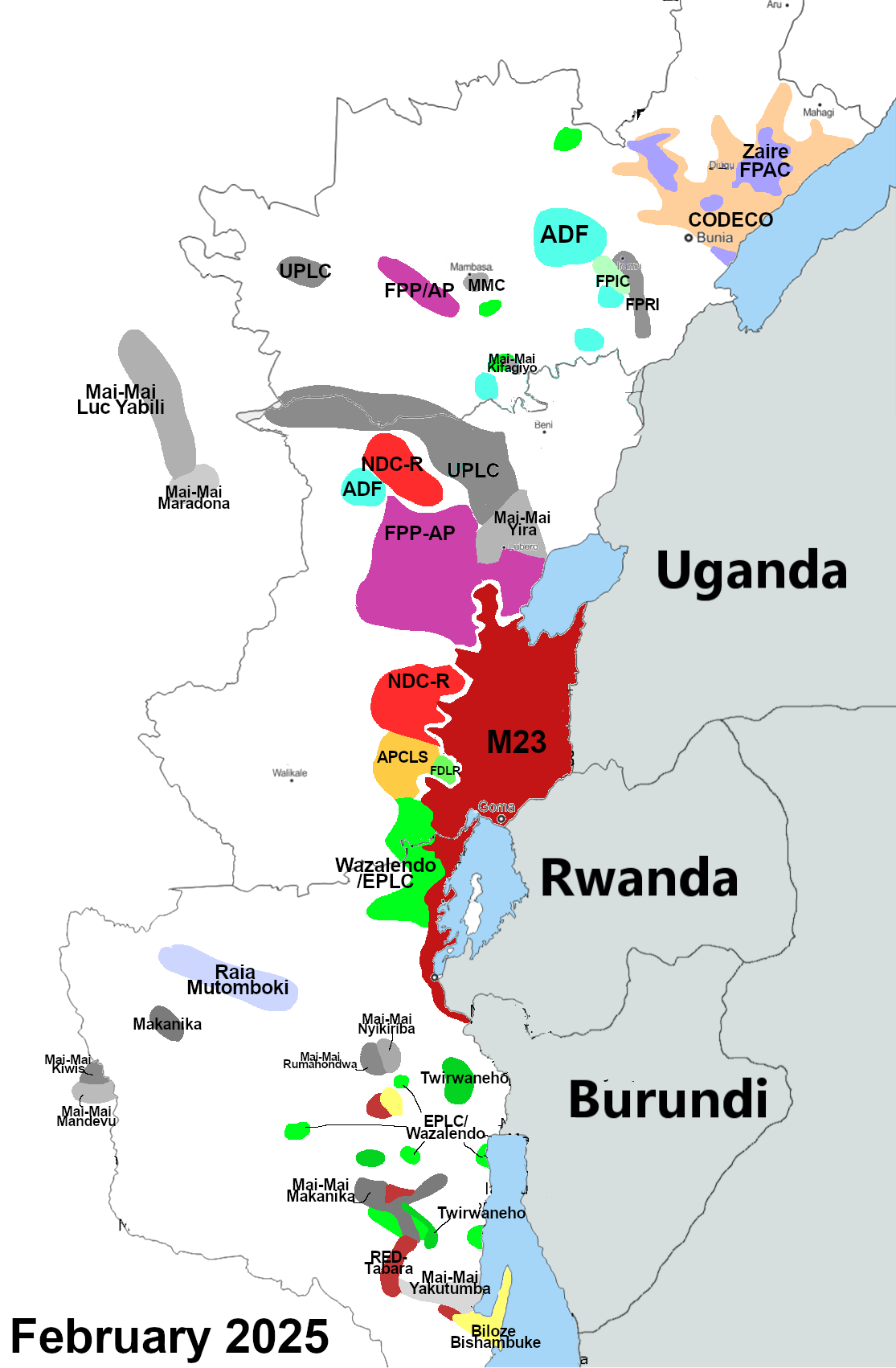
- An approximate map of the military situation in Kivu in February 2025.
Date	2 June 2004 – 27 February 2009 (first phase) (5 years, 3 months, 3 weeks and 4 days); 4 April 2012 – 7 November 2013 (second phase) (1 year, 7 months and 3 days); 31 January 2015 – present (third phase) (10 years, 7 months, 3 weeks and 3 days)
Location	Kivu, Democratic Republic of the Congo (spillover in Rwanda, Burundi and Ituri, Maniema and Tanganyika provinces, DRC)
Status	Ceasefire: FARDC victory against the CNDP in 2009 and the M23 movement in 2012; CNDP becomes a political party in the DRC; M23 movement signs peace agreement with the DRC government; renews fighting in 2022; Conflict breaks out between Rwanda and the Congo in 2022; FDLR, Mai-Mai militias and other armed groups still active in Eastern DRC; UN and FARDC begin operation to defeat the FDLR and their allies at the start of 2015

Belligerents (see full list)
Pro-government: DR Congo; (Democratic Republic of the Congo) Wazalendo (March 2024–); NDC-R; Burundi; (United Nations) MONUSCO; Angola; Zimbabwe; Botswana (against FNL and FNL–Nzabampema)	Rwandan-aligned militias: CNDP; Front for the Refoundation of the Nation; Congo River Alliance; M23; Banyamulenge; Twirwaneho; Gumino; Ugandan-aligned militias: FPRI; FPLC; FPDC; Foreign state actors: Uganda; Rwanda	Anti-Ugandan forces: IS-CAP; ADF-Baluku; ADF-Mukulu; Mai-Mai Kyandenga; UPLC; Anti-Rwandan militias: FDLR; RUD-Urunana; Other Hutu-aligned forces; Nyatura; Anti-Burundi militias: RED-Tabara; FNL	Mai-Mai militias: NDC-R (until March 2024); FPP-AP; AFRC; RNL; Mazembe; Malaika; Kifuafua; Simba; MAC; Raia Mutomboki; Fuliru Mai-Mai; Makanaki; Biloze Bishambuke; CNPSC; Other Mai-Mai groups

Commanders and leaders
(Democratic Republic of the Congo) Joseph Kabila (until 2019); (Democratic Republic of the Congo) Félix Tshisekedi (from 2019); (Democratic Republic of the Congo) Gabriel Amisi Kumba; (Democratic Republic of the Congo) Lucien Bahuma; (Democratic Republic of the Congo) Emmanuel Lombe; (United Nations) Bintou Keita; (United Nations) Ulisses de Mesquita Gomes; (Angola) João Lourenço; (Angola) José Eduardo dos Santos; (Zimbabwe) Emmerson Mnangagwa; (Zimbabwe) Robert Mugabe; (Botswana) Duma Boko; (Botswana) Mokgweetsi Masisi; (Botswana) Ian Khama	Laurent Nkunda (POW); Bosco Ntaganda (surrendered); Bertrand Bisimwa; Sultani Makenga; Jean-Marie Runiga Lugerero (surrendered); (Uganda) Yoweri Museveni; (Rwanda) Paul Kagame	Musa Baluku; Jamil Mukulu; Sylvestre Mudacumura †; Callixte Mbarushimana; Ignace Murwanashyaka (POW); Janvier Buingo Karairi (APCLS); Agathon Rwasa (FNL–Palipehutu); Aloys Nzabampema (FNL–Nzabampema)	Guidon Shimiray Mwissa; Ntabo Ntaberi Sheka (surrendered) (NDC); William Yakutumba (CNPSC); Devos Kagalaba (surrendered) (Raia Mutomboki); Salumu Kaseke (surrendered) (Raia Mutomboki)

Strength
2004: 20,000 total troops: (Democratic Republic of the Congo) 14,000 FARDC troops; *4,000–5,000 Mai Mai militia; 2008: 3,500 Mai-Mai militia; 6,000–7,000 FDLR; 2013: 22,016 MONUSCO personnel 2025: DRC: unknown; Burundi: 10,000 troops, 2,500 militia	6,000–8,000 CNDP (2007); 5,500+ M23 (2012) 2025: M23: 3,000–4,000; Rwanda: 4,000	2,000 FDLR; 3,000 FNL–Palipehutu; Hundreds of FNL–Nzabampema	1,000–1,250 (2018); Several thousand Raia Mutomboki militia; 10,000+ other armed groups; 1,500 ACPLS

Casualties and losses
FARDC: 71 killed BDF: Unknown (United Nations) 17+ killed	CNDP: 233 killed	Unknown	Unknown
- More than 7.3 million internally displaced persons (as of 2024), hundreds of thousands of excess deaths, 11,873+ people killed (including civilians and combatants of each sides)

The Kivu conflict, is an umbrella term for a series of protracted armed conflicts in the North Kivu and South Kivu provinces in the eastern Democratic Republic of the Congo which began after the Second Congo War ended. Including neighboring Ituri province, there are more than 120 different armed groups active in the eastern Democratic Republic of Congo. Currently, some of the most active rebel groups include the Allied Democratic Forces, the Cooperative for the Development of the Congo, the March 23 Movement, and many local Mai Mai militias. In addition to armed groups and the governmental FARDC troops, a number of national, regional and international forces have intervened militarily in the conflict, including the United Nations force known as MONUSCO, the militaries of Uganda and Burundi, and a force from the East African Community known as the East African Community Regional Force. The Kivu region is thus regarded as a key geopolitical arena, where local armed groups intersect with broader regional rivalries and international strategic interests. Analysts note that competition over natural resources, cross-border alliances, and external interventions have transformed the conflict from a purely domestic issue into a wider geopolitical struggle.

The conflict began in 2004 in the eastern Congo as an armed conflict between the military of the Democratic Republic of the Congo (FARDC) and the Hutu Power group Democratic Forces for the Liberation of Rwanda (FDLR) in the Democratic Republic of the Congo. It has broadly consisted of three phases, the third of which is an ongoing conflict as of 2026. Prior to March 2009, the main combatant group against the FARDC was the National Congress for the Defence of the People (CNDP). Following the cessation of hostilities between these two forces, rebel Tutsi forces, formerly under the command of Laurent Nkunda, became the dominant opposition to the government forces.

The United Nations Mission in the Democratic Republic of Congo (MONUSCO) has played a large role in the conflict. With 21,000 soldiers in the force, the Kivu conflict constitutes the largest peacekeeping mission currently in operation. In total, 93 peacekeepers have died in the region, with 15 dying in a large-scale attack by the Allied Democratic Forces, in North Kivu in December 2017. The peacekeeping force seeks to prevent escalation of force in the conflict, and minimise human rights abuses like sexual assault and the use of child soldiers in the conflict.

CNDP was sympathetic to the Banyamulenge in Eastern Congo, an ethnic Tutsi group, and to the Tutsi-dominated government of neighboring Rwanda. It was opposed by the FDLR, by the FARDC, and by United Nations forces.

In July 2024, a United Nation Security Council-commissioned report uncovered extensive Rwandan military activities in Nyiragongo, Rutshuru, and Masisi territories. The report revealed that Rwanda conducted 3,000 to 4,000 operations alongside M23 rebels, exerting significant control over them, and by April 2024, Rwandan troop numbers matched or exceeded M23's 3,000 fighters. The report detailed systematic Rwandan Defense Force (RDF) incursions, heavy weapon use, troop transport, and human rights abuses, including child soldier recruitment. Rwandan intelligence officers forcibly conscripted children as young as 12 from refugee camps, deceiving them with false job promises. The report noted FARDC's ties to armed groups like FDLR-FOCA and Wazalendo militias in the fight against M23. M23 are engaged in a wide range of abuses in the region: recruitment of child soldiers, violence against the civilian population, looting, illegal mining, and corruption.

== Background ==
=== Ethnic tensions in the AFDL rebellion ===
During the First Congo War (1996–1997), the rapid advance of the Alliance des Forces Démocratiques pour la Libération du Congo (AFDL) brought the Banyamulenge into the national spotlight, increasing their political influence and visibility while also worsening cycles of retaliatory violence with neighboring ethnic groups.

In early 1996, mounting unrest in South Kivu coincided with the direct involvement of regional militaries, as the Rwandan Patriotic Army (RPA), Uganda's People's Defence Force, and the Forces Armées Burundaises (FAB) provided support to Banyamulenge militias and other Tutsi armed factions in eastern Zaire. In April, Banyamulenge and allied Tutsi fighters killed between eight and ten refugees at Runingu camp. By August, RPA had begun moving Banyamulenge fighters across the Ruzizi River into the Hauts Plateaux as a "military vanguard", which provoked clashes with the Forces Armées Zaïroises (FAZ) and set off killings, arrests, and intimidation targeting Banyamulenge civilians throughout Uvira Territory. Protest marches were organized in Uvira and Bukavu, during which civil society figures and officials made "aggressive statements" against the Tutsi population.

Fear peaked after the South Kivu vice-governor declared in early October 1996 that the Banyamulenge had six days to leave the Hauts Plateaux or be treated as rebels. Soon after, on 6 October, Banyamulenge armed groups massacred more than fifty people, mostly civilians, in Kidoti, killing victims with shrapnel or executing them after forcing them to dig mass graves. That same day, Banyamulenge forces attacked Lemera Hospital, killing 37 people, including medical staff, civilians, and wounded FAZ soldiers, and looting the facility. Other violence followed on the night of 13 October, when the Runingu camp was attacked, leaving at least four people dead and seven wounded.

Concurrently, the AFDL coalition was being assembled in Kigali under Rwandan supervision, serving in part "as a smokescreen for the ambitions of Rwanda, Uganda, and Angola, whose troops would do much of the fighting". The coalition united four separate Congolese opposition groups under the leadership of Laurent-Désiré Kabila. Among them was the Alliance démocratique des peuples (ADP), dominated by Congolese Tutsi and led by Banyamulenge figures such as Dugu wa Mulenge, Joseph Rubibi, and Samson Muzuri. Although Banyamulenge leaders were wary of Kabila because of his role in the Simba rebellion and later uprisings in Fizi Territory in the 1960s and 1970s, they largely viewed the AFDL as vital to their "survival and political emancipation". Several hundred Banyamulenge joined the movement and received military training from Rwandan instructors.

The AFDL uprising also transformed leadership dynamics within the Banyamulenge community, as the authority of customary elders declined and younger political and military figures gained influence. After the AFDL's victory and during its period in power between 1997 and 1998, Banyamulenge were appointed to several high-ranking posts in South Kivu's provincial administration and in the administration of Uvira Territory, a development that provoked resentment among other ethnic groups. Notable appointments included Benjamin Serukiza as vice-governor of South Kivu, Jonas Sebatunzi as public prosecutor, and Mutabazi Muntu as director of the Agence nationale de renseignements (ANR).

At the national level, Banyamulenge held fewer positions, although Bizima Karaha was named Minister of Foreign Affairs, Moïse Nyarugabo became secretary-general of the Office des biens mal acquis (OBMA), Samson Muzuri was appointed ambassador to Germany, and others served as senior advisers in various ministries. Despite these advances, ties between the Banyamulenge and Rwanda weakened after the AFDL took power. Many Banyamulenge felt that their close association with Rwanda cast doubt on their Congolese citizenship and left them reliant on Kigali for security. Some argued that Rwanda had leveraged their vulnerable social status to advance its own strategic interests rather than to secure Banyamulenge rights.

These tensions were compounded by conflicting understandings of identity: while some Rwandan officials viewed the Banyamulenge as part of a wider Rwandan diaspora, most Banyamulenge continued to affirm their Congolese nationality. This gap in perception was mirrored in persistent rumours that Rwanda planned to resettle the entire Banyamulenge population in Kibuye, in western Rwanda, a proposal allegedly discussed with Banyamulenge leaders in December 1996. Other friction stemmed from the Banyamulenge's subordinate role within the reconstituted Congolese Armed Forces (Forces armées congolaises; FAC). During the rebellion, they had served mainly in lower ranks under Rwandan command and increasingly demanded greater authority after the war.

=== FRF and the RCD insurgency ===
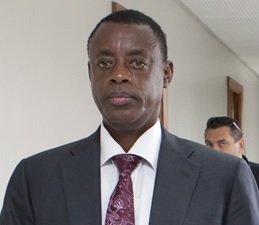
James Kabarebe (pictured) was a key figure in both the First Congo War and the Second Congo War as a commanding officer.

Tensions peaked in February 1998 when reports that Colonel James Kabarebe, the Rwandan chief of staff of the Congolese army, planned to redeploy Banyamulenge officers outside the Kivu region started a mutiny in Bukavu. Led by Eric Ruhorimbere, Venant Bisogo, and Mukalay Mushondo, the revolt subsided after Kabarebe personally intervened. Violence continued in March 1998, when around thirty Banyamulenge deserters attacked Rwandan troops in Bukavu, reportedly in response to mistreatment.

Led by Richard Tawimbi and Michel "Makanika" Rukunda, many of the rebels were captured, and several were sentenced to death. In June 1998, about thirty Banyamulenge intellectuals and activists convened in Bujumbura to establish an independent political organization. Participants included Manassé "Müller" Ruhimbika, head of the NGO Groupe Milima; Joseph Mutambo, a university lecturer whose parliamentary bid in 1982 had been rejected due to alleged "dubious nationality"; and Gasore Zébédée, a former adviser to a Kinshasa minister.

On 14 June 1998, they created the Forces républicaines fédéralistes (FRF), an underground party that for many years served as the only independent political platform representing Banyamulenge interests. The FRF promoted federalism as a less confrontational alternative to dependence on Rwanda and called for the establishment of a self-governing administrative unit on the Hauts Plateaux with broad authority, including its own security forces.

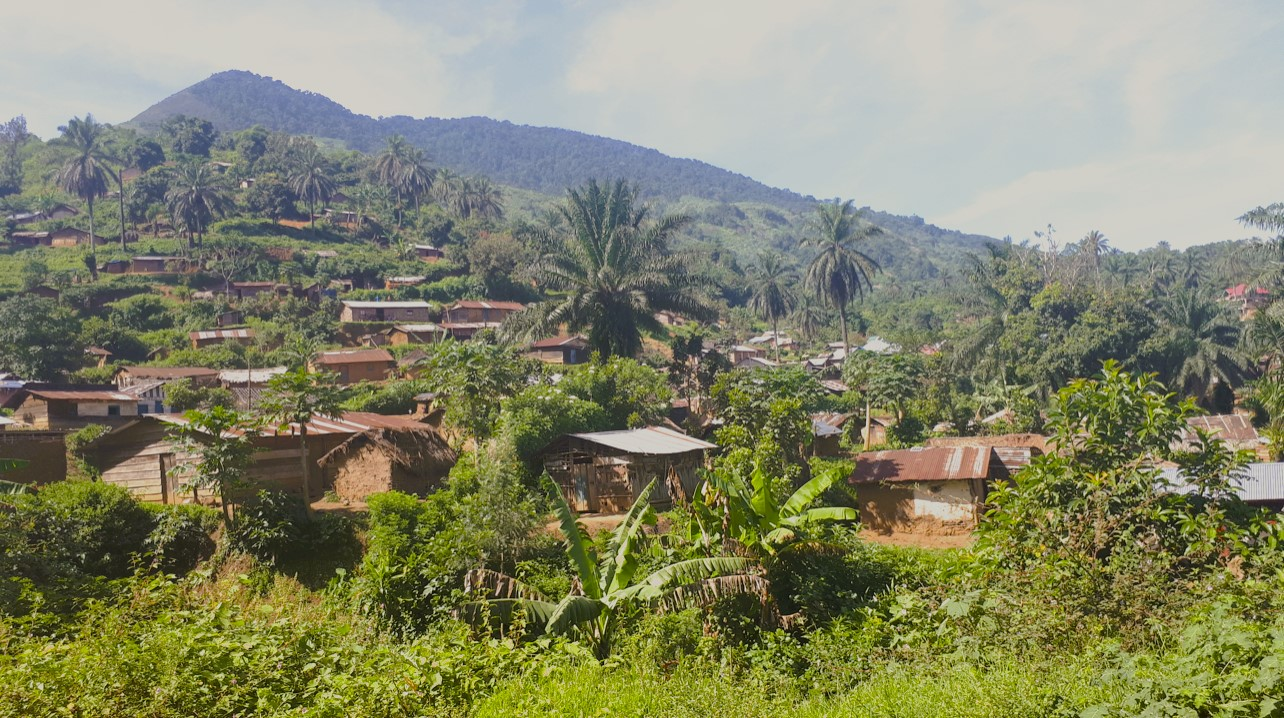
The Kasika village, where the Kasika massacre took place

Regional developments quickly eclipsed the FRF's initiatives. In July 1998, former AFDL spokesperson and now President Laurent-Désiré Kabila, demanded that Rwandan troops leave Congolese territory. In response, Rwanda backed a new insurgency, the Rassemblement congolais pour la démocratie (RCD), which launched on 2 August 1998. This put the Banyamulenge in a vulnerable position, as they faced attacks from Mai-Mai militias while being targeted by Kabila's government, which portrayed them as Rwandan proxies.

Official discourse in Kinshasa became increasingly inflammatory, including public calls for the eradication of those described as "vermin" poisoning the nation, rhetoric that coincided with the killing of dozens of Banyamulenge soldiers by non-Banyamulenge comrades in military camps in Kinshasa, Kamina, Kisangani, and Kananga. In response, RCD forces, often commanded in the field by Banyamulenge officers but operating under the overall RPA authority, carried out large-scale massacres of civilians in Makobola, Kasika, and Katogota during 1998 and 1999. Banyamulenge engagement with the RCD was shaped by security, political strategy, and personal advancement.

Some community members viewed the insurgency as an opportunity to address the perceived failures of the AFDL, particularly its inability to secure full citizenship rights and durable political representation. As the RCD expanded territorially, it also emerged as a pathway to senior political office. It enabled several Banyamulenge figures to assume prominent roles, including Bizima Karaha as head of security, Moïse Nyarugabo as justice commissioner, and Azarias Ruberwa as secretary-general. The RCD period thus produced mixed outcomes for the community: while it intensified violence between RCD forces and Mai-Mai militias, it also facilitated an unprecedented level of political influence and resulted in the creation, for the first time, of an administrative entity identified with the Banyamulenge, with Minembwe established as a territory and carved out of the Banyamulenge-inhabited areas of Fizi, Mwenga, and Uvira Territories.

These gains also strained relations with other groups, worsened by ongoing conflicts between pastoralists and farmers over transhumance, the seasonal southward movement of cattle into grazing areas in Ngandja and Lulenge during the dry season. Cattle often damaged crops, and after the AFDL rebellion began in September 1996, refusals to pay the customary itulo tax inflamed tensions. Mai-Mai groups responded with large-scale cattle raids, which functioned as material losses and as symbolic attacks on the Banyamulenge.

Internally, the RCD era worsened divisions within Banyamulenge themselves, as political competition began to intersect with clan affiliations. Estimates of major Banyamulenge clans range from 13 to 26, depending on classification. While each clan traditionally descends from a common ancestor, many expanded through alliances and the incorporation of other families. The community has never been united under a single paramount chief, and inter-clan rivalries long existed; however, these disputes gained new political significance with the rise of the RCD and the Pacifique Masunzu rebellion, which then marked the first prolonged period of sustained internal conflict.

== History ==
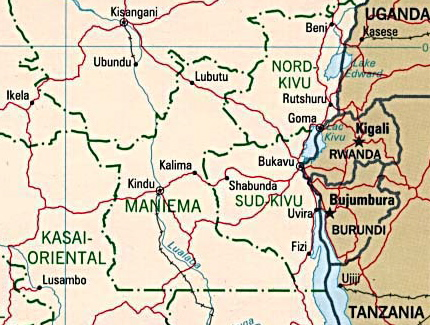
A map of the Eastern Democratic Republic of Congo

=== FDLR insurgency ===
The FDLR counts among its number the original members of the Interahamwe that led the 1994 Rwandan genocide. Established as a breakaway faction from the Rwandan Armed Forces (FAR), the FDLR initially sought to transition from a rebel group to a political-military entity dedicated to protecting Rwandan Hutu refugees and their interests in prolonged exile. This transformation enabled the promotion of new officers and the recruitment of fighters from refugee populations in eastern Congo. Despite its presence in the region, analysts, including the International Crisis Group, have asserted that the FDLR is not strong enough to pose a direct threat to Rwanda's government.

Its continued existence has been used as justification for Rwandan military interventions and the activities of Rwanda-backed groups like the National Congress for the Defence of the People (CNDP) and its successor, the March 23 Movement (M23). Some experts, including political scientist Bob Kabamba of the University of Liège, have suggested that economic motives, such as access to Congo's vast mineral wealth, have played a significant role in Rwanda's involvement in eastern Congo, dating back to its participation in the First Congo War in 1996.

Efforts to disarm and repatriate the FDLR have been ongoing since 2002, involving initiatives by DRC, Rwanda, and the United Nations Mission in the Democratic Republic of the Congo (MONUC, later MONUSCO). On 31 March 2005, FDLR representatives in Rome declared their willingness to cease military action against Rwanda and return home. Amnesty International reported that FDLR commanders continued to resist repatriation, citing fears of imprisonment, political exclusion, and loss of influence. The United Nations Security Council urged the group to uphold its commitments, and by 2006, approximately 1,500 FDLR members had been repatriated under a formal program.

In subsequent years, the FDLR's strength gradually declined. By 2007, Kinshasa and Kigali had launched the Nairobi Communiqué, an international framework for bilateral cooperation aimed at resolving the FDLR issue, building upon the earlier Kimia II operation led by the FARDC and MONUSCO. By 2014, the group's territorial control in North and South Kivu had significantly weakened, and its number of fighters had dwindled to an estimated 1,400–1,500.

In September 2014, FDLR leader Sylvestre Mudacumura, who had been targeted by an International Criminal Court (ICC) arrest warrant since July 2012, was killed by the Congolese military. In December 2023, Colonel Ruvugayimikore, also known as Ruhinda, the head of the FDLR's CRAP unit and regarded as one of its most skilled fighters, was also killed under unclear circumstances. By the 2020s, many analysts argued that the FDLR no longer posed a significant direct threat to Rwanda. However, its presence has long been cited as a justification for foreign military interventions in eastern Congo.

=== Intra-Banyamulenge political and military divisions ===
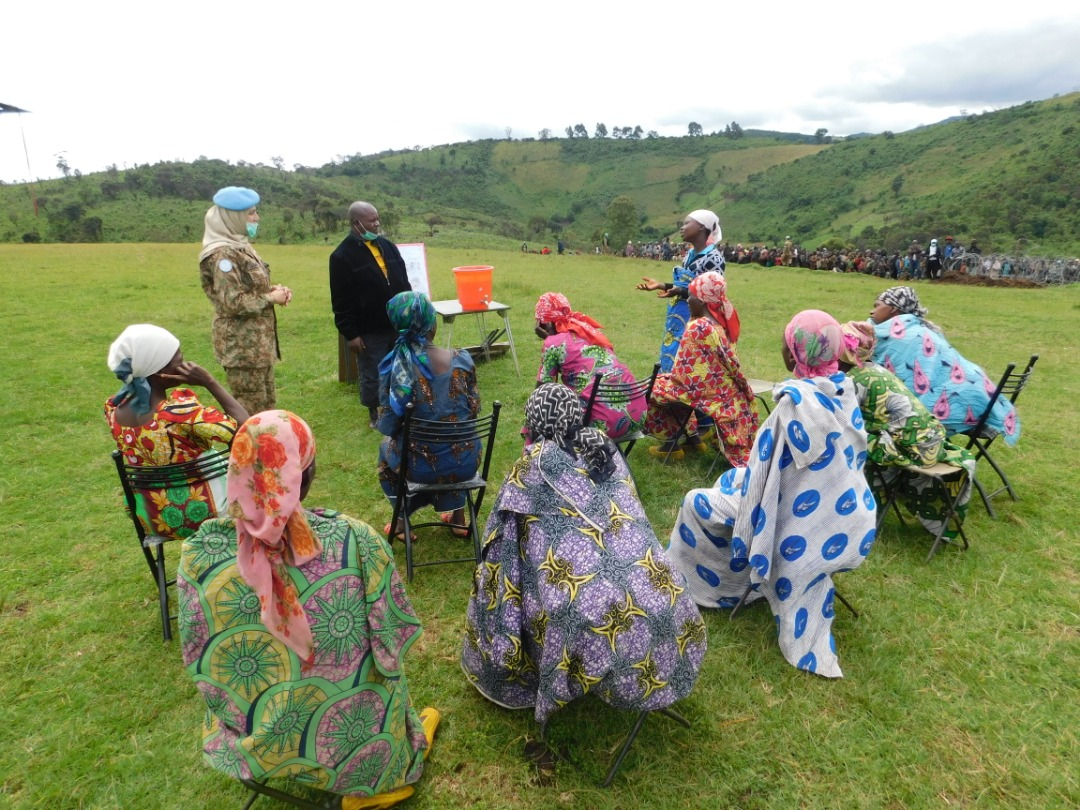
The Bijombo groupement of Bavira Chiefdom in Uvira Territory, shown here, where Pacifique Masunzu took refuge.

During the late 1990s and early 2000s, Pacifique Masunzu rose to prominence as one of the most "divisive figures" among Banyamulenge. Although he initially sympathized with the FRF, Masunzu had tense relationships with his Rwandan commanders. In early 1999, Colonel Dan Gapfizi, then the RPA commander in Uvira, ordered his arrest. With help from other Banyamulenge soldiers, Masunzu escaped and sought refuge in the Bijombo groupement of Bavira Chiefdom in Uvira Territory, and to limit internal dissent, the RCD later brought him back into its ranks and appointed him as deputy battalion commander in the highlands, but this compromise proved short-lived. In January 2002, following a conflict with his direct commander, Safari, Masunzu again broke away. Accounts of the incident vary widely, ranging from disputes over taxation and leadership rivalry to manipulation by RCD authorities or personal grievances. Regardless of its precise cause, the confrontation led Masunzu to withdraw once more into the Hauts Plateaux with a small armed group. His faction soon drew other dissidents, most notably Michel "Makanika" Rukunda, who became his second-in-command. As peace talks between the RCD and President Joseph Kabila's government approached in Sun City, Rwandan authorities sought to eliminate this challenge by deploying the RCD's 9th Brigade under General Jules Mutebutsi and detaining Banyamulenge officers suspected of sympathizing with Masunzu. When these efforts failed, the RPA launched a large-scale offensive on 28 March 2002, deploying several thousand troops against roughly 500 of Masunzu's fighters. Relying on the rugged Hauts Plateaux terrain, support from local Banyamulenge communities, and tactical cooperation with Mai-Mai groups and elements of the FDLR, Masunzu's forces managed to withstand the assault despite being heavily outnumbered.

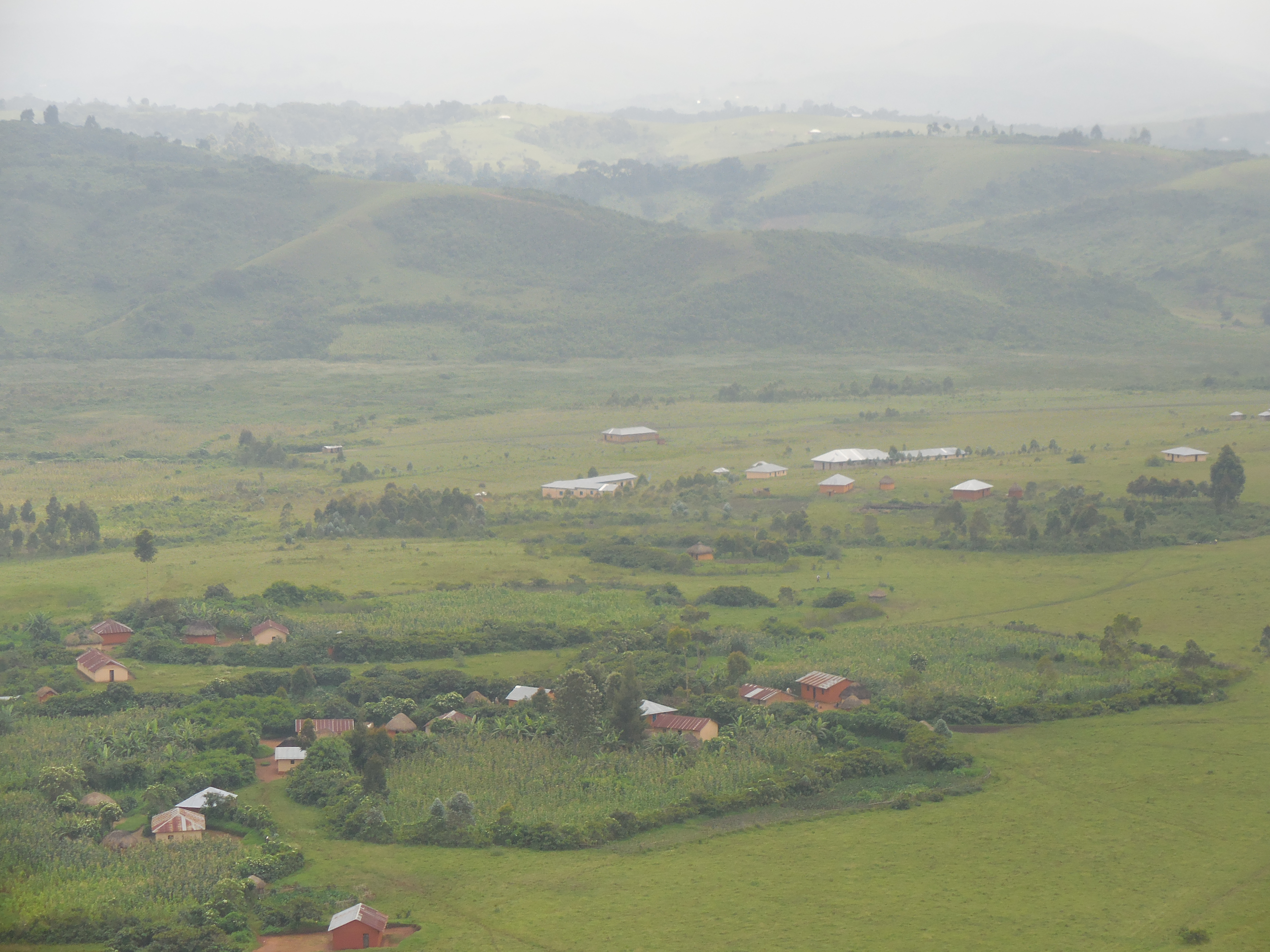
Minembwe (pictured) is located in Fizi Territory. During the Second Congo War, the RCD promoted the creation of unofficial politico-administrative structures, which strengthened the Banyamulenge's territorial claims and triggered retaliatory mobilization by other ethnic groups.

In April 2002, amid the political momentum generated by the Sun City talks, Masunzu joined other FRF leaders in reshaping the movement into a politico-military organization. Its armed wing became known as the Forces congolaises de résistance (FRC). The FRC quickly became the strongest military actor in the Hauts Plateaux and enjoyed considerable local support. The signing of the Global and All-Inclusive Peace Agreement in December 2002, however, set in motion a slow disintegration of the movement, mainly driven by clan politics. Masunzu, a member of the relatively small Abasinga clan, was widely seen as threatening the long-standing influence of larger Banyamulenge clans such as the Abanyabyinshi, Abasinzira, Abasita, and Abatira. Opposition from these groups deepened internal rifts within the FRC. Although international pressure led to the withdrawal of the RPA and RCD from the Hauts Plateaux in September 2002, which left the FRF/FRC in control, the movement was unable to translate its territorial hold into lasting national political leverage. During the 2003–2006 transition, it secured only limited military and political positions, and the abolition of the RCD-created Minembwe Territory in 2003 marked the loss of the Banyamulenge's most important wartime administrative achievement. Masunzu endorsed the dissolution, arguing that the territory was an illegal creation of the rebel era and that it would later be re-established through constitutional means. Many Banyamulenge nonetheless held him responsible for the loss, especially after his forces shut down the local administrator's office. His opponents describe this moment as the start of what they label "Masunzu's betrayal". After relocating to Kinshasa in 2003, he was accused of sidelining the FRF's political agenda to focus on personal connections with the presidency and career advancement within the national army. When the 2004 General Order integrating former combatants into the FARDC was issued, Masunzu benefited more than any other former FRC officer: he alone was promoted above the rank of major, attaining the rank of general in 2005, while his former deputy, Rukunda, was reduced from colonel. Over time, Masunzu's leadership grew more authoritarian, characterized by the monitoring of FRF politicians Sebintu Philemon and Rukema Levice and the arrest of Olivier Gasita, the FRC's acting commander.

==== Rising insecurity, "Group of 47", and reconstitution of the FRF ====
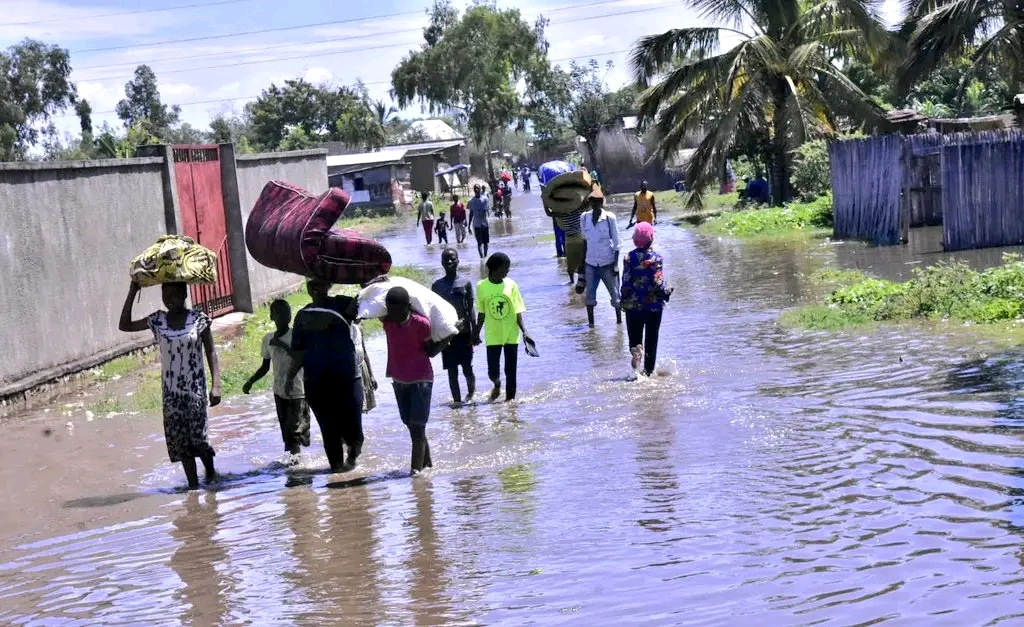
Gatumba, Burundi, site of the 2004 attack on the refugee camp.

During the transition, the Banyamulenge community experienced growing political marginalization as the decline of the RCD and the community's limited electoral prospects deepened the divide between pro-RCD elements and anti-Rwandan factions associated with Masunzu. This polarization was intensified by a series of security crises, beginning with the mutiny of Colonel Jules Mutebutsi, then deputy commander in South Kivu. Driven by fears that the RCD was losing influence within the transitional government, Mutebutsi rebelled against his superior. Although his uprising later intersected with Laurent Nkunda's rebellion in North Kivu, it stemmed primarily from personal rivalries and institutional uncertainty rather than a coordinated regional plan. Similar anxieties surrounding the brassage process (the integration of former combatants into a single national army) prompted around 175 Banyamulenge ex-RCD soldiers in Kalemie to flee to the Hauts Plateaux. Viewing them as a potential threat to his authority, Masunzu ordered their arrest and incorporation into his 112th Brigade. Tensions also escalated after the August 2004 massacre of Congolese refugees in Gatumba, Burundi, most of whom were Banyamulenge. Masunzu publicly endorsed the Congolese government's position that Burundian Forces nationales de libération (FNL) rebels were responsible and downplayed the ethnic dimension of the killings, suggesting it "targeted RCD supporters more than Banyamulenge". This stance generated widespread anger within the community, who suspected the "involvement of ex–Mai-Mai commanders or elements of the Congolese government". Days before the massacre, a Banyamulenge patrol had intercepted a vehicle carrying three Burundian nationals and a cache of ammunition, grenades, and fuel. When the patrol leader reported the incident to his superior, Colonel Dieudonné Mutupeke allegedly instructed him to allow the vehicle to pass. Although Congolese government involvement has never been conclusively proven, members of the patrol believe the weapons used in the Gatumba killings were those they had seen.

Meanwhile, remnants of Mutebutsi's forces, confined to a Rwandan military camp after the Bukavu mutiny, were preparing to return to the DRC. After more than a year under close surveillance, 46 officers and one civilian politician, Dada Abbas, crossed the Ruzizi River and established themselves in the Moyens Plateaux. The group was led by Colonel Venant Bisogo, as Mutebutsi himself reportedly fell out with Rwandan authorities and remained detained. While the precise motivations for the group's return remain contested, it is widely considered unlikely that such a movement could have occurred without at least tacit approval from Rwandan authorities. Following their arrival, the group reportedly received logistical and financial support from former RCD networks, including the "Belgian-Katangan businessman" Raphaël Soriano Katoto Katebe. The creation of the so-called "Group of 47" sparked the most intense internal violence the Banyamulenge had ever faced. Soon after, Masunzu, then serving as deputy commander in Kasai-Occidental, returned to the Hauts Plateaux. His reappearance triggered further defections, most notably Michel Rukunda's, who established a competing faction in Muramvya on the Plateaux. Rukunda's group was strengthened by soldiers who defected from Masunzu's 112th Brigade, many of whom had family ties within Rukunda's faction and harbored grievances against Masunzu. The volatile security environment on the Plateaux provided Masunzu, who was promoted to general in July 2005, with grounds to remain in South Kivu rather than take up his assignment in Kasai-Occidental. Critics viewed this decision as a calculated effort to retain control over the Hauts Plateaux and to shield his troops from the brassage process. In 2007, Masunzu was named interim commander of South Kivu. His 112th Brigade, made up exclusively of Banyamulenge soldiers, was never integrated through brassage and stayed directly under his command. While this arrangement limited the territorial expansion of insurgent factions, it prolonged and intensified the intra-Banyamulenge conflict.

In January 2007, clashes between Masunzu's forces and Rukunda's Muramvya faction led to the deaths of nine senior officers. As a result, Rukunda's group merged with Bisogo's "Group of 47", having concluded that they could not survive independently. The merger was driven more by military pragmatism than shared ideology, since Rukunda held strong anti-Rwandan views while Bisogo maintained links with senior commanders in Kigali. The FRF leadership, based in Bujumbura under Gasore Zébédée, seized this opportunity to engage the dissidents in order to bolster their military position in pursuit of political objectives. A preliminary agreement was eventually reached to revive the FRF as a politico-military movement, with its armed wing renamed the Force for the Defense of the People (Force pour la défense du peuple; FDP). Rukunda was appointed chief of staff, and Bisogo assumed the presidency of the FRF. After periods of fighting and negotiation, President Joseph Kabila sent General Moustapha Jonas Mukiza Kayoyo as a special envoy to the Hauts Plateaux in October 2007. His mediation produced a ceasefire that allowed the FRF to control large areas of the Plateaux and to establish governance mechanisms and strengthen local revenue streams. Under FRF rule, parallel administrative structures emerged, including offices overseeing social affairs, the environment, justice, finance, foreign relations, and political propaganda. Despite this institutional expansion, the movement remained heavily militarized and authoritarian in practice. Traditional and state authorities were formally preserved but subjected to coercion and intimidation, especially when seen as loyal to the central government or to Masunzu. Through the imposition of market, road, and mining taxes, the FRF expanded its local revenue base and reduced dependence on the financing of sympathetic businessmen and politicians.

Although political dissent was suppressed, segments of the Banyamulenge population viewed FRF governance positively, largely because it brought improved security and an end to major fighting. The movement also implemented small-scale development efforts, including the construction of a 55-kilometer road linking Mikalati to Kabara and a bridge spanning the Lwelila River. Other local communities, however, regarded the presence of a mono-ethnic armed force with suspicion, a sentiment exploited by Mai-Mai groups that framed their mobilization as community self-defense. As the FRF's political wing gained prominence, tensions with Masunzu intensified, which complicated efforts to reach an accommodation with Kinshasa. Initially centered on opposition to Masunzu's authority, the conflict gradually expanded to encompass broader political claims. These demands were formally presented at the Goma peace conference in January 2008 and included the temporary deployment of FRF-integrated FARDC units to the Hauts Plateaux, recognition of FRF ranks and payment of salary arrears, re-establishment of Minembwe Territory along its former boundaries, and the creation of an international commission of inquiry into massacres of Banyamulenge civilians in 1996, 1998, and 2004. Although the FRF signed the January 2008 ceasefire agreement alongside other armed groups, subsequent negotiations yielded limited progress.

=== 2004–2009: Nkunda's CNDP rebellion ===
In 2003, the peace procedure was already starting to unravel in North Kivu. Under the terms of the deal, all belligerents were to join a transitional government and merge their forces into one national army. However, it quickly became clear that not all parties were fully committed to peace. An early sign of this was the defection of three senior Rally for Congolese Democracy–Goma officers, among them Laurent Nkunda, who feared Kabila's administration would sideline them and sought to retain their authority.^{:14–24} Nkunda was appointed as the group's commander in North Kivu but declined to attend his swearing-in in Kinshasa, citing security concerns. Analysts suggested Rwanda positioned Nkunda as a proxy to retain its control over the eastern DRC. Prior to this, in 2002, Nkunda had served as RCD-Goma's brigade commander in Kisangani, where the group was involved in a massacre that claimed the lives of over 160 civilians in May of that year.^{:14–24} Despite these allegations, Nkunda was never investigated. In early 2003, he established the political movement Synergie pour la Paix et la Concorde, which was formally launched in Bukavu in December of that year, with its operational base set up in Goma.

==== 2004 Bukavu offensive ====
Tensions escalated after the February 2004 arrest of Officer Joseph Kasongo in South Kivu for his alleged involvement in the assassination of President Laurent-Désiré Kabila. This event triggered armed clashes between the national army and RCD-Goma forces, culminating in a ten-day siege of Bukavu. During this period, RCD-Goma troops committed widespread human rights violations, including unlawful civilian deaths and sexual violence against women and children, with victims as young as three years old. Estimates from international humanitarian agencies suggested that as many as 80 people were killed in the fighting between 26 May and 6 June. Nkunda defended his actions by claiming that his forces were preventing genocide against the Banyamulenge community. However, the United Nations Organization Stabilization Mission in the Democratic Republic of the Congo (MONUSCO) dismissed this justification, stating that all residents of Bukavu, including the Banyamulenge, had suffered from the violence. Reports from local sources suggested the presence of Rwandan military personnel assisting RCD-Goma forces, though Rwanda denied any involvement. On 9 June, government troops reclaimed control of Bukavu following the withdrawal of RCD-Goma forces into the Masisi forests. The retreat led to a split within Nkunda's army, with a faction led by Colonel Jules Mutebusi fleeing to Rwanda. Meanwhile, reports indicated that approximately 150,000 Kinyarwanda-speaking people fled from South Kivu to North Kivu, fearing reprisal attacks.

By December 2004, internal divisions within RCD-Goma deepened, particularly as local Tutsi leaders denounced the manipulation of Banyarwanda identity and declared their support for the central government. This internal schism led North Kivu's Governor Eugène Serufuli to realign with Kinshasa.

==== 2005–2006: Clashes with DRC army ====
In 2005, General James Kabarebe, Rwanda's Chief of Defence Staff, directed senior ex-RCD-Goma officers to ensure Nkunda's protection upon his planned return to the DRC. Operating from Kitchanga, the headquarters of the 83rd Brigade, Nkunda mobilized former RCD-Goma commanders to defect from the national army. This period coincided with the brassage program, an integration initiative requiring soldiers to undergo training before redeployment outside their original regions. Many ex-RCD-Goma troops, reluctant to leave the Kivus, defected to Nkunda's ranks. By the end of 2005, elements of the 82nd, 81st, and 83rd Brigades coalesced under his command. In response to Nkunda's growing influence, the government issued an arrest warrant against him on 7 September 2005. The first significant confrontation between his forces and the national army occurred in late 2005 in Rutshuru Territory. Lieutenant Colonel Shé Kasikila led efforts to recover weapons distributed to civilians by former RCD-Goma officials. However, his actions, along with his vocal opposition to Rwandan involvement in the DRC and uncovering mass graves containing the victims of massacres carried out by the Rwandan army and its Congolese allies during the First Congo War, provoked reprisals from Nkunda's forces, which launched an offensive and drove government troops out of Rutshuru.

In 2006, Nkunda expanded his network by integrating General Bosco Ntaganda, a former chief of staff of the Union des Patriotes Congolais (UPC), into his ranks. Ntaganda was soon appointed Chief of Staff of the newly established Congrès National pour la Défense du Peuple (CNDP), formally launched on 26 July 2006.^{:25-28} Although the country was set to hold national elections on 30 July, and Nkunda had vowed to respect the results, leading to a decisive victory for Kabila's coalition in the Kivus, he remained defiant.^{:28–31} On 25 November, just a day before the Supreme Court confirmed Kabila's victory in the presidential runoff, the CNDP launched an attack on FARDC's 11th Brigade in Sake, killing at least 25 civilians and leading to further casualties in Kitchanga and Tongo groupement of Bwito Chiefdom. Mass graves were later discovered near Tingi, outside Sake. Unable to mount an effective defense, FARDC turned to MONUSCO peacekeepers for support. In response, the UN urged the Congolese government to engage in negotiations with Nkunda, prompting Interior and Security Minister General Denis Kalume to travel to eastern DRC to initiate talks. On 7 December, CNDP forces attacked FARDC positions in Nord Kivu, but with military backing from MONUSCO, FARDC managed to reclaim its positions, killing around 150 CNDP fighters. The violence forced approximately 12,000 Congolese civilians to flee to Kisoro District, Uganda. That same day, a rocket fired from the DRC struck Kisoro District, which killed seven people.

==== 2007 ====
In early 2007, the central DRC government attempted to reduce the threat posed by Nkunda by trying to integrate his troops further into the FARDC, the national armed forces, in what was called a 'mixage' process. However, this backfired and it now appears that from about January to August Nkunda controlled five brigades of troops rather than two. On 24 July 2007, the UN peacekeeping head Jean-Marie Guehenno stated, "Mr Nkunda's forces are the single most serious threat to stability in the DR Congo". However, by August 2007, the initiative had failed, exacerbating human rights violations, particularly against the Hutu population. Médecins Sans Frontières (MSF) reported 181 cases of rape in Mutanda, Rutshuru. Over 50 villages were looted, and more than 60 vehicles were ambushed. Units loyal to Nkunda, including the Bravo Brigade's 2nd Battalion under Lieutenant Colonel Innocent Zimulinda, were implicated in numerous atrocities, including massacres in Buramba and the assassination of Abbé Richard Bemeriki, the priest of Jomba parish church in Rutshuru. Soldiers of the Charlie Brigade were responsible for civilian killings in Rubaya, Masisi Territory. As mixage unraveled, on 5 September, after FARDC forces claimed they had killed 80 of Nkunda's fighters using a Mil Mi-24 helicopter gunship, Nkunda urged the government to re-engage in peace talks. That same month, Nkunda's men "raided ten secondary schools and four primary schools where they took the children by force in order to make them join their ranks". According to the United Nations, boys were turned into soldiers while girls were subjected to sexual slavery, in violation of international law. In the aftermath of the UN report, thousands of Congolese civilians fled their homes, seeking refuge in displacement camps. The situation was further complicated by the rise of competing militias, notably the Patriotes Résistants Congolais (PARECO). This group, composed of CNDP defectors and Hutu fighters, emerged as a strong adversary to CNDP, with its leadership accusing the national army of collaborating with opposing forces.

The government set a 15 October deadline for CNDP forces to begin disarming. When this deadline passed without compliance, Kabila ordered FARDC to prepare for a forced disarmament of CNDP. On 17 October, government forces moved towards Kitchanga, Nkunda's stronghold. As fighting intensified between Nkunda's forces and government-backed Mai-Mai fighters around Bunagana, thousands of civilians fled to Rutshuru, arriving several days later. There were separate reports of government troops engaging units under Nkunda around Bukima, near Bunagana, as well as some refugees fleeing across the border into Uganda. The number of people displaced by the fighting since the beginning of the year was estimated at over 370,000. In early November 2007, Nkunda's forces seized control of Nyanzale, located approximately 100 km (62 mi) north of Goma. Three nearby villages were also reported to have been captured, and the army's outpost was left unguarded. A government offensive in early December led to the 82nd Brigade taking Mushake, a town that overlooks an important road. However, Reuters reported that the town was taken by the FARDC's 14th integrated brigade. This came after MONUSCO announced it would provide artillery support to the FARDC during the offensive. At a regional conference in Addis Ababa, the United States, Burundi, Rwanda, and Uganda committed to backing the Congolese government while refusing to support what they referred to as "negative forces", a term widely interpreted as a reference to Nkunda's forces. Nkunda stated on 14 December 2007 that he was open to peace talks. The government called such talks on 20 December to be held from 27 December to 5 January. These talks were then postponed to be held from 6–14 January 2008.

==== January 2008 peace deal ====
Nkunda's group attended the talks, but walked out on 10 January 2008, after an alleged attempted arrest of one of their members. They later returned to the talks. The talks' schedule was extended to last until 21 January, and then to 22 January as an agreement appeared to be within reach. It was further extended to 23 January over final disagreements regarding war crimes cases. The peace deal was signed on 23 January and included provisions for an immediate ceasefire, the phased withdrawal of all rebel forces in North Kivu, the resettlement of thousands of villagers, and immunity for Nkunda's forces.

The agreement encouraged FARDC and the United Nations to remove FDLR forces from Kivu. Dissatisfaction with progress and lack of resettlement of refugees caused the CNDP forces to declare war on the FDLR and hostilities to resume, including civilian atrocities. Neither the Democratic Forces for the Liberation of Rwanda nor the Rwandan government took part in the talks, a fact which may hurt the stability of the agreement.

==== Fall 2008 fighting ====
On 26 October, the CNDP captured the Rumangabo military base and Virunga National Park, using the park as a staging ground for further attacks. This happened after the peace agreement failed, leading to battles that displaced thousands of people. The park was valuable due to its location on the main road to Goma. On 27 October, riots broke out near the United Nations compound in Goma, with locals throwing Molotov cocktails and rocks, blaming the UN forces for not preventing the rebel advances. The FARDC also retreated in what was seen as a "major retreat" under the pressure from the CNDP. Attack helicopters and armored vehicles of MONUSCO were used in an effort to halt the advance of the rebels, who claim to be within 7 miles (11 kilometres) of Goma. Special Representative of the UN Secretary-General for DRC Alan Doss explained the necessity of engaging the rebels, stating that "...[the UN] can't allow population centers to be threatened... [the UN] had to engage". On 28 October, rebels and combined government-MONUSCO troops battled between the Kibumba refugee camp and Rutshuru. Five rockets were fired at a convoy of MONUSCO vehicles protecting a road to the territorial capital of Rutshuru, hitting two armored personnel carriers. The APCs, which contained Indian Army troops, were relatively undamaged, though a Lieutenant Colonel and two other personnel were injured. Rebel forces later captured the town. Meanwhile, civilians continued to riot, at some points pelting retreating Congolese troops with rocks, though UN spokeswoman Sylvie van den Wildenberg stated that the UN has "reinforced [their] presence" in the region.

By 29 October, the CNDP had seized control of large areas of the Masisi and Rutshuru territories with minimal resistance. As the CNDP advanced, they began dismantling internally displaced persons (IDP) camps, such as those in Kasasa and Nyongera. The rebel forces, either directly or through supervision, oversaw the destruction of these shelters, forcing many civilians to flee once again. Despite the CNDP's military dominance, the group declared a unilateral ceasefire rather than pursuing an assault on Goma. However, this ceasefire was not reciprocated by the Congolese government, and hostilities between the CNDP, FARDC, and pro-government militias, including PARECO and various Mai-Mai groups, persisted. On that same day, a request by France for the European Union to deploy an additional 1,500 troops was rejected by various nations, making its realization highly improbable; however, the UN forces present vowed to prevent any takeovers of civilian areas. The United Nations Security Council issued a unanimous non-binding resolution condemning the recent rebel advances and demanding an end to them. Despite the ceasefire, World Vision workers had to flee to the Rwandan border to continue their work, while gunfire was still heard. The United States Department of State sent Jendayi Frazer, the Assistant Secretary of State for African Affairs, as an envoy to the region.

On 30 October, the CNDP officially took control of Kiwanja, and Nkunda called for direct talks with the Congolese government, saying he would take Goma "if there is no ceasefire, no security, and no progress in the peace process". The next day, 31 October, the CNDP appointed Jules Simpenzwe as the new territorial administrator. Military experts later argued that the CNDP's main target in its late October offensive was Rutshuru, not Goma. On the same day, Nkunda announced plans to create a "humanitarian aid corridor", a no-fire zone where displaced people could return home with the approval of the United Nations task force in Congo. However, Human Rights Watch reported that the CNDP used this strategy to mobilize civilians, who later faced abduction, sexual violence, and extrajudicial killings. MONUC spokesman Kevin Kennedy stated that MONUC's forces were stretched thin trying to keep peace within and around the city. According to Anneke Van Woudenberg, more than 20 people were killed overnight in Goma alone. Meanwhile, Secretary of State Condoleezza Rice contacted Rwandan President Paul Kagame to discuss a long-term solution. Also, on 31 October, British Foreign Minister David Miliband and French Foreign Minister Bernard Kouchner flew to the region, with the intention of stopping in Kinshasa, Goma, and possibly Kigali.

Between 4 and 5 November, Human Rights Watch estimated that CNDP forces executed at least 150 people in Kiwanja. Many of the victims had gunshot wounds to the head or injuries from machetes, spears, or clubs, indicating extrajudicial killings rather than casualties from combat. Among those killed were at least 14 children, 8 women, and 7 elderly people. On 6 November, rebels broke the ceasefire and took control of another town in eastern DRC during clashes with FARDC forces on the eve of a regional summit on the crisis. CNDP rebels captured the center of Nyanzale, a key military base in North Kivu, after FARDC retreated. In the weeks after the CNDP took Kiwanja and Rutshuru, CNDP fighters also raped at least 16 women and girls.

==== Angolan involvement ====
In November 2008, during the clashes around Goma, a UN source reported that Angolan troops were seen taking part in combat operations alongside government forces. Kinshasa repeatedly denied that foreign troops were on its soil — an assertion echoed by the UN mission, which has 17,000 blue-helmeted peacekeepers on the ground. There is "military cooperation" between Congo and Angola, and that "there are perhaps Angolan (military) instructors in country", according to the UN. Angola, a former Portuguese colony, sided with Kinshasa in the 1998–2003 Second Congo War that erupted when Democratic Republic of Congo was in a massive rebellion.

==== 2009–2012: Ihusi agreement, Operation Umoja Wetu, and 23 March 2009 agreement ====
International diplomatic efforts, combined with pressure on both Kinshasa and Kigali, eventually led to negotiations between the DRC and Rwanda. These talks culminated in the signing of the Ihusi Agreement on 16 January 2009.^{:33–36} Prior to this, the United Nations Group of Experts on the DRC had revealed that the conflict in the Kivus had evolved into a proxy war, with Kinshasa supporting Mai-Mai groups and the FDLR, while Kigali backed the CNDP.^{:33–36} The Goma Conference on 23 January 2008, further raised Nkunda's profile, with his media presence straining relations with Rwanda. In January 2009, Ntaganda announced the removal of Nkunda as the leader of the CNDP, citing mismanagement. Nkunda, caught by surprise, was unable to resist this change. On 16 January 2009, Ntaganda publicly declared the CNDP's integration into the Congolese army during a ceremony in Goma, attended by both the Rwandan Defence Minister and the Congolese Interior and Security Minister. The stated goal of this Rwanda-DRC agreement was to initiate joint operations against the FDLR, but the immediate priority was the consolidation of CNDP control and its integration into the Congolese military. On January 22, 2009, Nkunda crossed into Rwanda at Kabuhanga, where he was arrested by Rwandan officers. His associates, including Makenga, were directed to proceed with the integration process. Following Nkunda's removal, Rwandan and Congolese forces launched Operation Umoja Wetu ("Our Unity"), deploying approximately 4,000 Rwandan troops into eastern DRC to combat the FDLR. Concurrently, former CNDP officers were integrated into the Congolese army, securing key positions within it, with guarantees they would not be stationed outside the Kivus.

On 23 March 2009, the Kinshasa government finalized agreements with the CNDP and other armed groups, officially integrating CNDP forces into the national military, resulting in the dissolution of the CNDP. However, the integration process was fraught with difficulties, as many CNDP officers retained significant control in the Kivus. Operation Umoja Wetu was marked by significant human rights abuses, with both government and former rebel forces committing atrocities. Between January and September 2009, Human Rights Watch reported over 1,400 civilian deaths, primarily women, children, and the elderly, often accompanied by widespread sexual violence. In the first nine months of 2009, health centers in North and South Kivu recorded over 7,500 cases of sexual violence, nearly double the previous year's numbers. The instability created by these events contributed to the emergence of new armed groups in the region. On 18 August, three Indian UN soldiers were killed by Mai-Mai rebels in a surprise attack at a MONUSCO base in Kirumba, Nord-Kivu. On 23 October, Mai-Mai rebels attacked a MONUSCO base in Rwindi (30 km or 19 mi north of Kirumba). UN troops killed 8 rebels in the battle.

Ntaganda emerged as a key figure in the post-integration period, securing the role of deputy commander in government operations against the FDLR. He leveraged this position to appoint former CNDP officers to strategic roles, particularly in the mineral-rich regions of Nyabibwe, Bisie, and Bibatama, expanding their influence over mining operations. The CNDP continued to manipulate the integration process, incorporating Rwandan personnel into the Congolese army, including individuals with no prior affiliation to the CNDP. Some CNDP factions also remained outside the integration framework, hedging their positions for future developments. By 2011, Ntaganda had consolidated substantial power, particularly after the incapacitation of General Dieudonné Amuli in a plane crash. His growing authority allowed him to oversee military operations and personnel appointments across the Kivus. The 23 March 2009 agreement would later serve as a reference point for future conflicts, particularly with the emergence of the March 23 Movement in 2012, a rebellion led by former CNDP officers who contested the terms of the integration and broader governance of the region.

=== M23 rebellion ===
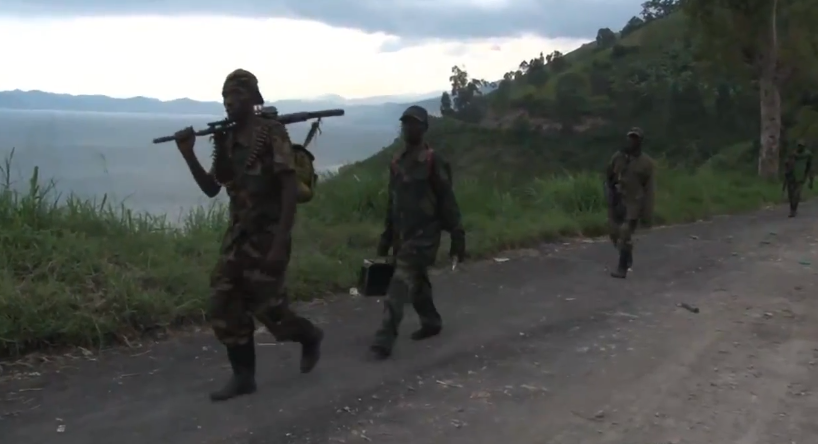
M23 rebels withdraw from Goma after it captured the city in November 2012.

In March 2009, the CNDP had signed a peace treaty with the government, in which it agreed to become a political party in exchange for the release of its imprisoned members. In April 2012, former National Congress for the Defence of the People (CNDP) soldiers mutinied against the government. The mutineers formed a rebel group called the March 23 Movement (M23). Former CNDP commander Bosco Ntaganda, known as "the Terminator" is accused of founding the movement.

On 4 April, Ntaganda and 300 loyal troops defected from the DRC and clashed with government forces in the Rutshuru region north of Goma. Africa Confidential said on 25 May 2012 that "the revolt now seems to be as much about resisting an attempt by Kinshasa to disrupt CNDP networks in the restive Kivu provinces, a process of which Ntaganda may find himself a casualty."

On 20 November 2012, the M23 took control of Goma after the national army retreated westward. MONUSCO, the United Nations peacekeeping force, watched the takeover without intervening, stating that its mandate allowed it only to protect civilians. M23 withdrew from Goma in early December following negotiations with the government and regional powers.

On 24 February 2013, leaders of 11 African nations signed an agreement designed to bring peace to the eastern region of the Democratic Republic of Congo. The M23 rebels were not represented in the deal's negotiations or at the signing. Following disagreements in the M23 about how to react to the peace agreements, M23 political coordinator Jean-Marie Runiga Lugerero, was sacked by its military chief Sultani Makenga. Makenga declared himself interim leader and clashes between those loyal to him and those loyal to Jean-Marie Runiga Lugerero, who is allied with Bosco Ntaganda, have killed ten men and two others were hospitalized.

In March 2013, the United Nations Security Council authorized the deployment of an intervention brigade within MONUSCO to carry out targeted offensive operations, with or without the Congolese national army, against armed groups that threaten peace in eastern DRC. It is the first peacekeeping unit tasked with carrying out offensive operations.

=== 2013: MONUSCO intervention ===
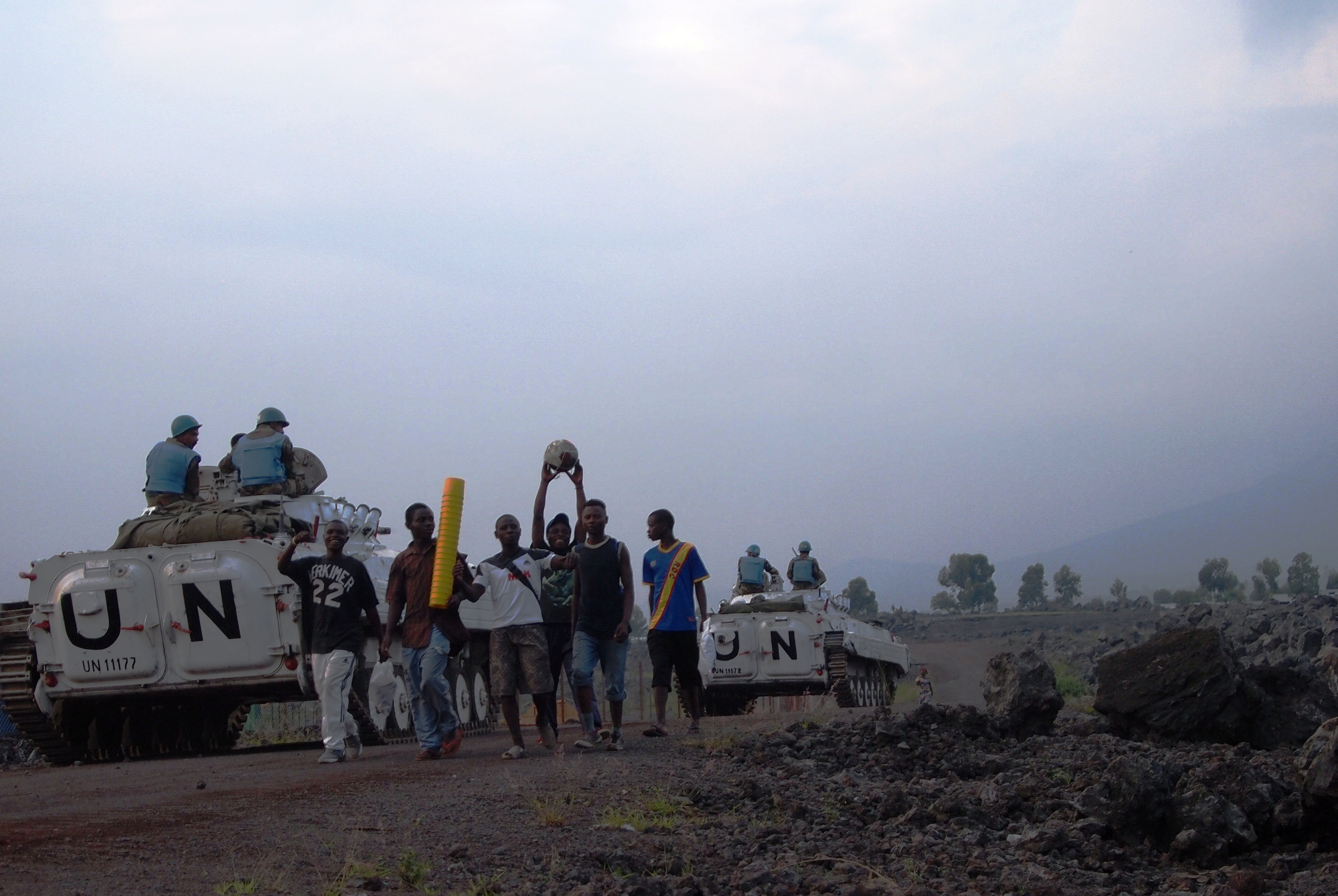
MONUSCO peacekeepers of the North Kivu brigade on patrol in a street of Goma pass a group of teenagers returning from a football game

On 28 March 2013, faced with recurrent waves of conflict in eastern DRC threatening the overall stability and development of the country and wider Great Lakes region, the Security Council decided, by its Resolution 2098, to create a specialized "intervention brigade" for an initial period of one year and within the authorized MONUSCO troop ceiling of 19,815. It would consist of three infantry battalions, one artillery and one special force and reconnaissance company and operate under direct command of the MONUSCO Force Commander, with the responsibility of neutralizing armed groups and the objective of contributing to reducing the threat posed by armed groups to state authority and civilian security in eastern DRC and to make space for stabilization activities.

The council also decided that MONUSCO shall strengthen the presence of its military, police and civilian components in eastern DRC and reduce, to the fullest extent possible for the implementation of its mandate, its presence in areas not affected by conflict in particular Kinshasa and in western DRC.

The last batch of the Malawi troops committed to the MONUSCO Force Intervention Brigade arrived in Goma, North Kivu province, on 7 October 2013. They will be part of the 3000- strong force to which Tanzania and South Africa are the other two troop contributing countries.

Since the arrival of its first troops in June 2013, the Intervention Brigade has already gone into action resulting in the withdrawal of M23, 30 kilometres (19 mi) from its initial positions in Kanyaruchinya, on 31 August 2013.

The Intervention Brigade reached full strength with the arrival of a Malawi infantry battalion. Tanzania, South Africa and Malawi were selected for the UN Stabilization Mission in DR Congo (MONUSCO) because of they had experience with UN Peacekeeping missions. For example, 95 percent of the Malawi troops has already done in peacekeeping missions in Kosovo, Liberia, Rwanda, Sudan.

=== M23 resurgence ===
Military situation as of 16 May 2025 Controlled by March 23 Movement and allied militias Controlled by Land Forces of the Democratic Republic of the Congo and allied militias Presence of Ugandan army forces Presence of Burundi army forces Presence of Wazalendo militias (DRC-aligned) Resources: Gold mines Tantalum, tungsten or tin mines

From 28 March 2022, the M23 Movement launched a new offensive in North Kivu, allegedly with Rwandan and Ugandan support. The offensive resulted in the displacement of tens of thousands of refugees, while the rebels had been able to capture some territory by June.

==== United Nations experts sound alarm ====
In July 2024, a United Nations Security Council-commissioned report revealed extensive Rwandan military activities in the Nyiragongo, Rutshuru, and Masisi territories. The report, based on authenticated photographs, drone footage, video recordings, eyewitness testimonies, and intelligence data, provided evidence that Rwanda's military had engaged in 3,000 to 4,000 interventions in collaboration with the M23 rebels, with Kigali exerting substantial influence over the group's actions.

By April 2024, estimates suggested that Rwandan troop numbers equaled or even surpassed the 3,000 M23 fighters active in the area. The report further detailed systematic incursions by RDF, the use of artillery and armored vehicles equipped with radar and anti-aircraft missile systems, the deployment of troop transport trucks, and serious human rights violations, including the recruitment of child soldiers. According to the findings, children as young as 12 were forcibly conscripted from nearly all refugee camps in Rwanda by intelligence officers, often lured with false promises of payment or employment.

These children were transferred to training camps in rebel-controlled areas, where they were supervised by Rwandan military personnel and M23 fighters. Beyond Rwanda's involvement, the report also raised concerns about the proximity between FARDC and other armed groups, including the Democratic Forces for the Liberation of Rwanda (FDLR-FOCA) and Wazalendo militias, both of which have aided government forces in combatting M23's occupation. M23's acts of violence include indiscriminate attacks on civilians, ransom payments, extrajudicial executions, sexual violence and the use of explosive weapons in populated areas.

2025 offensives

On 27 January 2025, M23 claimed to have captured Goma.

In January 2025, the DRC severed diplomatic ties with Rwanda.

On 27 June 2025, the DRC and Rwanda signed a peace agreement to end the conflict following negotiations mediated by the United States.

=== 2015–2016: Operations against FDLR and other armed groups ===
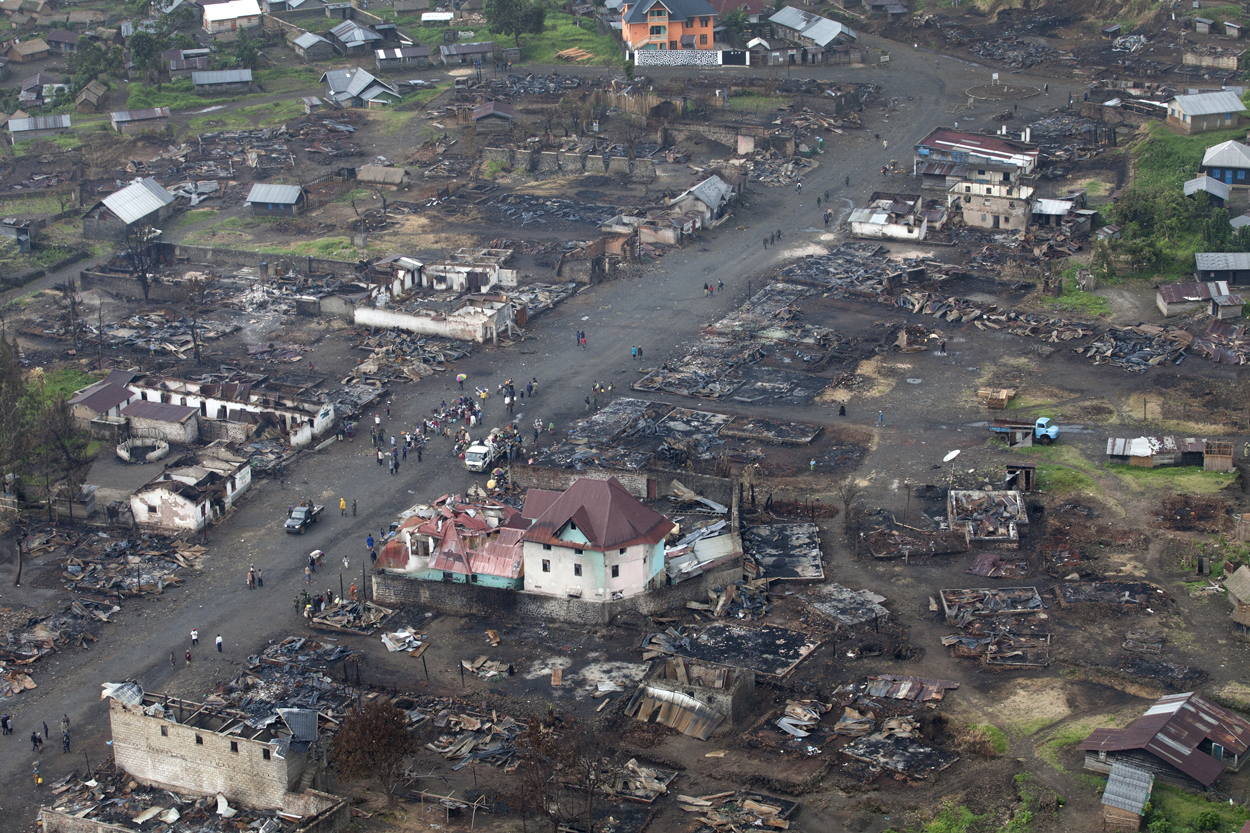
Destruction in the town of Kitchanga caused by fighting between FARDC and APCLS rebels in 2013

In January 2015, it was reported that UN and Congo troops were preparing an offensive on FDLR in the Kivu region, while striking FNL-Nzabampema positions on Eastern Congo on 5 January 2015. Several days earlier an infiltration by an unknown rebel group from Eastern Congo to Burundi left 95 rebels and 2 Burundi soldiers dead.

On 13 January 2015, the Congolese military held a press conference announcing the destruction of four of the 20 militant factions operating in South Kivu. The Raïa Mutomboki armed group will undergo disarmament. A total of 39 rebels were killed and 24 captured since the start of the Sokola 2 operation in October 2014, 55 weapons and large quantities of ammunition were also seized. FARDC casualties amounted to 8 killed and 4 wounded.

On 25 January 2015, 85 Raïa Mutomboki rebels surrendered to the authorities in the town of Mubambiro, North Kivu; the former militants will be gradually integrated into FARDC. Earlier in January, Raïa Mutomboki, founder Nyanderema, approached the town of Luizi with a group of 9 fighters, announcing their abandonment of armed struggle. 24 rifles, 2 grenades and other military equipment was transferred to FARDC during the two incidents.

On 31 January, the DRC troops launched a campaign against the FDLR Hutu rebels. On 13 March 2015, a military spokesman announced that a total of 182 FDLR rebels were killed since the start of the January offensive. Large amounts of weaponry and ammunition were seized, as the army recaptured the towns of Kirumba Kagondo, Kahumiro, Kabwendo, Mugogo, Washing 1 and 2, Kisimba 1, 2 and 3, among other locales.

In January 2016, fighting broke out between the FDLR, ADF and Mai-Mai militias, which resulted in thousands fleeing to surrounding areas in North Kivu's Goma.

=== Ethnic Mai Mai factions ===
Ethnic conflict in Kivu has often involved the Congolese Tutsis known as Banyamulenge, a cattle herding group of Rwandan origin derided as outsiders, and other ethnic groups who consider themselves indigenous. Neighboring Burundi and Rwanda, who have a thorny relationship, are accused of being involved, with Rwanda accused of training Burundi rebels who have joined with Mai Mai against the Banyamulenge and the Banyamulenge is accused of harboring the RNC, a Rwandan opposition group supported by Burundi.

In June 2017, the group, mostly based in South Kivu, called the National People's Coalition for the Sovereignty of Congo (CNPSC) led by William Yakutumba was formed and became the strongest rebel group in the east, even briefly capturing a few strategic towns. The rebel group is one of three alliances of various Mai-Mai militias and has been referred to as the Alliance of Article 64, a reference to Article 64 of the constitution, which says the people have an obligation to fight the efforts of those who seek to take power by force, in reference to President Kabila.

Bembe warlord Yakutumba's Mai-Mai Yakutumba is the largest component of the CNPSC and has had friction with the Congolese Tutsis who often make up commanders in army units. In May 2019, Banyamulenge fighters killed a Banyindu traditional chief, Kawaza Nyakwana. Later in 2019, a coalition of militias from the Bembe, Bafuliru and Banyindu are estimated to have burnt more than 100, mostly Banyamulenge, villages and stole tens of thousands of cattle from the largely cattle-herding Banyamulenge. About 200,000 people fled their homes.

Clashes between Hutu militias and militias of other ethnic groups has also been prominent. In 2012, the Congolese army in its attempt to crush the Rwandan backed and Tutsi-dominated CNDP and M23 rebels, empowered and used Hutu groups such as the FDLR and a Hutu dominated Maï Maï Nyatura as proxies in its fight. The Nyatura and FDLR even arbitrarily executed up to 264 mostly Tembo civilians in 2012.

In 2015, the army launched an offensive against the FDLR militia. The FDLR and Nyatura were accused of killing Nande people and of burning their houses. The Nande-dominate UPDI militia, a Nande militia called Mai-Mai Mazembe and a militia dominated by Nyanga people, the "Nduma Defense of Congo" (NDC), also called Maï-Maï Sheka and led by Gédéon Kyungu Mutanga, are accused of attacking Hutus.

In North Kivu, in 2017, an alliance of Mai-Mai groups called the National Movement of Revolutionaries (MNR) began attacks in June 2017 includes Nande Mai-Mai leaders from groups such as Corps du Christ and Mai-Mai Mazembe. Another alliance of Mai-Mai groups is CMC which brings together Hutu militia Nyatura and are active along the border between North Kivu and South Kivu. In September 2019, the army declared it had killed Sylvestre Mudacumura, head of the FDLR, and in November that year the army declared it had killed Juvenal Musabimana, who had led a splinter group of the FDLR.

=== 2017–2021: ADF and Islamic insurgency ===
Approximately 1.7 million were forced to flee their homes in the DR Congo in 2017 as a result of intensified fighting.

On 27 September 2017, fighting erupted in Uvira as anti-government rebels of the CNPSC attempted to capture the city. This was part of an offensive launched in June of the same year.

On 7 December 2017, an attack orchestrated by the Allied Democratic Forces on a UN base in Semuliki in the North Kivu region resulted in the death of at least 15 UN peacekeepers from the MONUSCO mission. This attack drew international criticism, with UN Secretary-General António Guterres describing the incident, the worst altercation involving peacekeepers in recent history, as a "war crime". The assault, in terms of fatalities, was the most severe suffered by peacekeepers since an ambush in Somalia in 1993. The peacekeeping regiment that came under attack was composed of troops from Tanzania. In addition to the peacekeepers, five soldiers from the FARDC were killed in the attack. Analysts felt that the size and scale of the attack was unprecedented, but that it represented another step in the conflict which has been prevalent in the region for many years. The motivation for the attack was unknown, but it was expected to further destabilise the region. The Congolese forces claimed that the Islamist ADF lost 72 militants in the attack, raising the total number of fatalities in excess of 90.

During 2018, ADF carried out numerous attacks to Beni, inflicting high casualties to civilians and government soldiers:

- 23 September 2018, ADF raided the town of Beni, killing at least 16 people, including four government soldiers.
- 21 October 2018, ADF rebels attacked the town of Matete, just north of Beni, resulting in 11 civilians killed and 15 people were kidnapped (ten of which were children ages five to ten years old). This prompted aid workers to suspend efforts to roll back an outbreak of deadly Ebola.

In addition, on 16 December 2018, Maï-Maï militiamen attacked the Independent National Electoral Commission (CENI) warehouse in Beni ahead of 23 December election, security forces repel attackers without suffering casualties. According to the Congo Research Group (a study project at New York University), as of 2018, 134 armed groups are active in North and South Kivu.

On 31 October 2019, the Congolese army launched a large scale offensive against the ADF in the Beni Territory of the North Kivu Province. According to spokesman General Leon Richard Kasonga, "The DRC armed forces launched large-scale operations overnight Wednesday to eradicate all domestic and foreign armed groups that plague the east of the country and destabilize the Great Lakes region." The operation is being carried out by the FARDC without any foreign support. The focus is primarily on the ADF but also other armed groups are being targeted.

On 13 January 2020, the Congolese army raided ADF's headquarters camp, nicknamed "Madina", which is located near Beni. 30 Congolese soldiers were killed and 70 were wounded in the intense battle with ADF. 40 ADF insurgents were also reported killed, including five top commanders. The Congolese army nevertheless captures the camp, but fails to apprehend the target of the raid, ADF leader Musa Baluku.

On 26 May 2020, at least 40 civilians were killed with machetes by the ADF in Ituri province.

On 16 September 2020, the DRC and 70 armed groups active in South Kivu agreed to cease hostilities.

On 20 October 2020, more than 1,300 prisoners escaped from a jail in Beni after an attack claimed by the ISCAP (Islamic State's Central Africa Province).

On 26 October 2020, The Congolese armed forces took control of the headquarters of Burundi rebel group National Forces of Liberation (NFL) after three days of intense fighting. The army also said they fought some members of the National Resistance Council for Democracy (NRCD). Troops killed 27 rebels, seizing arms and ammunition, while three soldiers died in the fighting, with another four wounded. Now the rebels are fleeing toward the forests of Muranvia, Nyaburunda and Kashongo as well as the Nyanzale Rudaga valley.

On 31 December 2020, Allied Democratic Forces (ADF) massacred 25 civilians in the village of Tingwe. On 1 January 2021, the village of Loselose was recaptured by DRC after a battle between Congolese army, supported by UN peacekeepers and ADF. Two Congolese soldiers and 14 Islamist militants were killed, seven Congolese soldiers were wounded.

On 4 January 2021, ADF attacked villages of Tingwe, Mwenda and Nzenga and killed 25 civilians and kidnapped several others. DRC authorities also discovered 21 civilian bodies "in a state of decomposition" in Loselose and Loulo.

On 4 February 2021, ISIS operatives exchanged fire with Congolese soldiers in the Rwenzori region, on the border between the Democratic Republic of Congo and Uganda. Three soldiers were killed and several others were wounded. The other soldiers fled. ISIS operatives seized vehicles, weapons and ammunition.

On 22 February 2021, the Italian ambassador to DR Congo Luca Attanasio, an Italian law enforcement official and a driver were killed in an attack on a UN convoy near the town of Kanyamahoro, 16 kilometers north of Goma.

On 26 February 2021, IS operatives killed at least 35 Congolese soldiers and wounded many more after a Congolese army force approached IS positions in Losilosi, in the Beni region.

On 6 March 2021, IS militants attacked Congolese forces in a village in the Irumu region. During the attack, at least 7 soldiers were killed and the rest fled. IS operative seized weapons and ammunition.

On 31 March 2021, ADF militants linked to ISIS, massacred 23 civilians after attacking a village in the Beni region.

On 9 April 2021, two civilian trucks transporting Christian civilians were targeted by ISIL gunfire southeast of Beni. 5 of the passengers were killed. A Congolese soldier was also shot dead in the area on the same day.

On 23 April 2021, Congolese army camps were targeted by ISCAP militants in the Oicha region. One Congolese soldier was killed in the attacks.

On 30 April 2021, president Felix Tshisekedi declared a "state of siege" over the province of North Kivu that went into effect on 6 May. The state of siege will last for 30 days in which the province will be under military rule.

On 5 May 2021, the FARDC attacked and captured the village of Nyabiondo from APCLS. During the fighting a woman was wounded.

On 24 May 2021, ISIS operatives attacked a Congolese army camp near Kanjabai Prison, in the Beni region, about 50 km west of the Congo-Uganda border. Two soldiers were killed in the exchange of fire. ISIS operatives set fire to the camp.

On 29 June 2021, two Congolese soldiers were killed after ISCAP attacked their positions in the Ituri region.

On 29 July 2021, ISCAP militants attack a convoy of Christian civilians on the Ituri-Beni highway, killing one civilians and destroying 6 vehicles.

On 9 August 2021, ISIL forces took control of the villages of Mavivi and Malibungo in the Ituri region, killing at least one Congolese soldier and capturing 3 others.

On 13 September 2021, ISCAP forces attacked a village in the Ituri region, burning down the homes of several Christians and executing at least one Congolese soldier.

== Human rights abuses ==
=== Child recruitment by the armed groups ===
Violence is widespread: "In Masisi 99.1% (897/905) and Kitchanga 50.4% (509/1020) of households reported at least one member subjected to violence. Displacement was reported by 39.0% of households (419/1075) in Kitchanga and 99.8% (903/905) in Masisi," one study found.

Many armed groups participating in the conflict have used children as active combatants. According to the report published [on 23 October 2013], almost 1,000 cases of child recruitment by armed groups were verified by MONUSCO between 1 January 2012 and 31 August 2013, predominantly in the district of North Kivu. The use of child soldiers in the Kivu conflict constitutes another example of the use of child soldiers in the DRC. The UN has asserted that some of the girls being used as belligerents are also subjected to sexual assault, and are treated as sex slaves.

=== Sexual violence in the Democratic Republic of the Congo ===
The Kivu conflict has created chaos and disorder in the regions of North and South Kivu. MONUSCO believe that widespread sexual assault has been perpetrated against women in this regions by all sides of the conflict, something which the UNHCR has condemned. Incidents have involved the rape and sexual assault of both women and girls, included the incorporation of girls into militia forces as sex slaves. The most publicised example of sexual violence occurred in November 2012 in Minova. Having retreated to the town, FARDC troops conducted systematic rape against the women and girls over a period of three days. This resulted in widespread international condemnation, prompting the Army to begin an investigation in order to prosecute the perpetrators of the sexual assaults.

In 2014, the "Minova Trial" was conducted. It was the largest rape tribunal in the nation's history. While the American Bar Association, which had an office in Goma, had identified more than 1,000 potential victims, the official list composed by the UN only had 126, of whom 56 testified at the trial. For reasons of safety, those testifying were forced to hide their faces by donning hoods. In the end, only a few junior officers were convicted. Sexual violence in the region has continued, but by 2015, funding had declined for sanctuaries for the women and protection.

=== Conflict minerals ===
The role of conflict minerals in the conflict is highly debated. Certain NGOs, like the Enough Project, say that the illegal exploitation of minerals is the main cause of the ongoing violence in the Kivus. A United Nations report supported this view. However, many academic and independent researchers (both Congolese and international) challenge this interpretation, arguing that while conflict minerals are undoubtedly one of the many causes of violence in the region, they are most likely not the most significant and impactful one.

The most prominent and prevalent conflict mineral procured in the Kivu districts is gold. Due to its high financial value, rival militias will attack one another for control of the mineral. An investigation into conflict minerals in relation to the Kivu conflict found that "gold is now, as of 2013, the most important conflict mineral in eastern Congo, with at least 12 tons worth roughly $500 million smuggled out of the east every year." These high financial revenues were identified as the primary incentives for the mining and capture of gold.

To illustrate this, this study looked at one specific rebel group, determining that "The M23 rebel group has taken over a profitable part of the conflict gold trade in the east of the Democratic Republic of the Congo...It is using revenues from the illicit trade to benefit its leaders and supporters and fund its military campaign by building military alliances and networks with other armed groups that control territory around gold mines and by smuggling gold through Uganda and Burundi. M23 commander Sultani Makenga, who is also allegedly one of the rebels' main recruiters of child soldiers according to the U.N. Group of Experts on Congo, is at the center of the conflict gold efforts."

=== Role of European arms ===
In 2021, the Transnational Institute published a report about the role of the arms trade in displacements, finding that "between 2012 and 2015 Bulgaria exported assault rifles, large-calibre artillery systems, light machine guns, hand-held under-barrel and mounted grenade launchers to the Democratic Republic of Congo's national police and military. [...] Bulgarian weapons were in use in North Kivu in 2017 coinciding with the forced displacement of 523,000 people." Highlighting the role of the military in human rights abuses, they write that FARDC soldiers in North Kivu "possessed Bulgarian-manufactured ARSENAL weaponry that had been exported to the DRC." The UN found the FARDC to have been responsible for at least 20% of the human rights violations it documented in this region.

== See also ==
- Ituri conflict
- List of conflicts in Africa
