= Jules Mutebutsi =

Congolese rebel leader (1960–2014)

Jules Mutebutsi, also known as Jules Mutebusi and Jules Mutebuzi, (c. 1960 – 9 May 2014) was a Congolese military person and rebel leader of the Rally for Congolese Democracy. He has been often described as a Rwandan proxy. Mutebutsi was captured in 2004 and was put on trial for treason. He was soon sentenced to exile. He would remain in exile until his death in 2014.

== Career ==
Mutebutsi was a Munyamulenge from South Kivu Province.

On 26 May 2004 Mutebutsi together with Laurent Nkunda captured the city of Bukavu. Both were soldiers in the military of the Democratic Republic of the Congo. They cited they wished to protect the Banyamulenge population in the DRC. During their occupation of the city Amnesty International called on the two to make their troops observe human rights after violations had occurred. On 9 June they withdrew after they were defeated by government troops, Mutebutsi fled to Rwanda, together with 300 troops and stayed in the city of Ntendezi. He held the rank of Colonel at the time of his escape to Rwanda. Mutebutsi said he fled towards Rwanda because Congolese and United Nations troops were trying to kill him. He was arrested in December 2007 by rwandeses authorities when he tried to cross the border into DRC. He remained in exile and under house arrest in Rwanda.

Mutebutsi died in a Kigali hospital from an illness (probably a heart attack), aged 54. Prior to his death Mutebutsi had voiced concern over his safety, as he had not supported the March 23 Movement.
