= Mount Hoyo =

Mountain in the Democratic Republic of the Congo

Highest point
- Elevation: 1,450 m (4,760 ft)
- Coordinates: 1.24582°N 29.81984°E

Geography
- Location: eastern Democratic Republic of the Congo

Mount Hoyo (French: Montagne Hoyo) is a mountain in the eastern Democratic Republic of the Congo. The mountain is a limestone massif with 40 caves. Its altitude is 1,450 m (4,760 ft). It is part of the Ituri rainforest and located about 70 km (43 mi) west of Lake Albert, 92 kilometres (57 mi) away from north of Beni and 19 kilometres (12 mi) away from south of Komanda.

== History ==
Since at least 2021 the mountain has served as a base of rebels from the Allied Democratic Forces. In 2025 it was used to perpetrate the Komanda massacre.
