= Crispin Mbindule =

Congolese politician

Member of the National Assembly
- Constituency: Butembo

Personal details
- Party: Union for the Congolese Nation

Crispin Mbindule Mitono is a Congolese politician and Union for the Congolese Nation Member of the National Assembly of the Democratic Republic of the Congo.

He was educated at the Université Catholique du Graben.
