= William Yakutumba =

Congolese rebel leader

General William Yakutumba
- Born: William Amuri Yakutumba likely 1970 (age 55–56); Lubondja, Fizi, Zaire (now DRC)
- Allegiance: Mai-Mai (1996–2003); Mai-Mai Réformé (2007–2011); Mai-Mai Yakutumba (2011–present); CNPSC (2017–present)
- Service years: 1996–present
- Conflicts: First Congo War; Second Congo War; Kivu conflict

William Amuri Yakutumba (likely born 1970) is the leader of the National Coalition of the People for the Sovereignty of Congo, an anti-government rebel coalition fighting in the Kivu conflict. Yakutumba has been involved in armed mobilization since 1996, fighting for the Mai-Mai before eventually leading his own group. Yakutumba claims to fight for democracy and against the purported invasion of Rwandophone populations in the east of the Democratic Republic of the Congo.

== Early life and education ==
Yakutumba was born to a Bembe family in the Lubondja sector of Fizi in the mid-1960s or 1970s. In 1990, he traveled to Lubumbashi to study history at the University of Lubumbashi. After three years at UNILU, he broke off his studies for unknown reasons. In 1996, when Laurent Kabila's AFDL invaded the country, Yakutumba returned to Fizi and joined the Mai-Mai.

== Military career ==
Yakutumba fought for the Mai-Mai in both the First and Second Congo Wars. Originally fighting alongside rebel forces during the first war, he ended up fighting for the new Kabila government against the Rwandan-backed Rally for Congolese Democracy. Yakutumba's unit was under the command of a certain Dunia Lwendama, who had been active in rebellions since the 1960s.

=== Mai-Mai Réformé ===
At the end of the Second Congo War, many Mai-Mai leaders felt marginalized, believing they had not gained political and military representation they deserved for their role in the war. During this time, the government was attempting to demobilize Mai-Mai groups and integrate them into the national army. In 2007, the FARDC sent trucks to finish the integration of the 118th Brigade, the Mai-Mai unit under Yakutumba's command. Yakutumba and a small group of loyalist fighters fled to the Ubwari Peninsula, where they established Mai-Mai Réformé. This prompted the government to try and negotiate with Yakutumba, who stated he would integrate into the armed forces if Banyamulenge units did so first. It was at this time that Yakutumba began to refer to himself as "General".

=== Mai-Mai Yakutumba ===
In September 2007, Yakutumba and his political deputy, Raphael Looba Undji, visited Kinshasa at the invitation of then-president Joseph Kabila. They spent around six months in the city, where they established political contacts. Following the visit, Yakutumba established the Party of Action for the Reconstruction of Congo (PARC), the political wing of his group.

During the period of 2009–2010, Yakutumba used his forces to pressure politicians and the armed forces into supporting his goals. During this time, he also feigned disarmament, which he would use to regroup and strengthen his militia more. Yakutumba also had entered a relationship with the National Forces of Liberation, a dissident Burundian rebel faction. This relationship allowed Yakutumba's forces access to more advanced training and weaponry. In 2011, he merged his political wing, the PARC, with his new armed wing, the Alleluia Armed Forces (FAAL), forming the PARC-FAAL, better known as Mai-Mai Yakutumba.

This new development caused Yakutumba to shift his rhetoric to a national scale, claiming Joseph Kabila was an agent of Rwanda. As the years went on, however, Mai-Mai Yakutumba fell out of political relevance, content with taxing roads, fishing, and gold mining in areas under the group's influence. Yakutumba, by 2014, no longer had the military prowess or political clout he had in the years before.

=== National Coalition of the People for the Sovereignty of Congo ===
In late 2016 to early 2017, Yakutumba re-emerged, leading a wide coalition of Mai-Mai groups calling itself the National Coalition of the People for the Sovereignty of Congo (CNPSC). The new coalition launched two major offensives in South Kivu in 2017 and 2018, even coming close to capturing Uvira city. Yakutumba stated that he intended to overthrow the government to "chase the dictator Kabila from power". Yakutumba claims to have around 10,000 troops under his command, but analysts disagree, stating he has close to 1,000.

As of 2020, the CNPSC is engaged in fighting mainly against the Banyamulenge-led Ngumino and Twiganeho militias. In a recent video statement, Yakutumba re-affirmed the coalition's goals, as well as denounced alleged invasions of the country by Rwandophone groups.

On 19 June 2023, the European Union and United Kingdom placed sanctions on Yakutumba for his alleged role in violating international law and committing wartime sexual violence during the Kivu conflict. He was also banned from entering the European Union.

== See also ==
- National Coalition of the People for the Sovereignty of Congo
