= National Coalition of the People for the Sovereignty of Congo =

Congolese rebel coalition in South Kivu

- Coalition Nationale du Peuple pour la Souveraineté du Congo
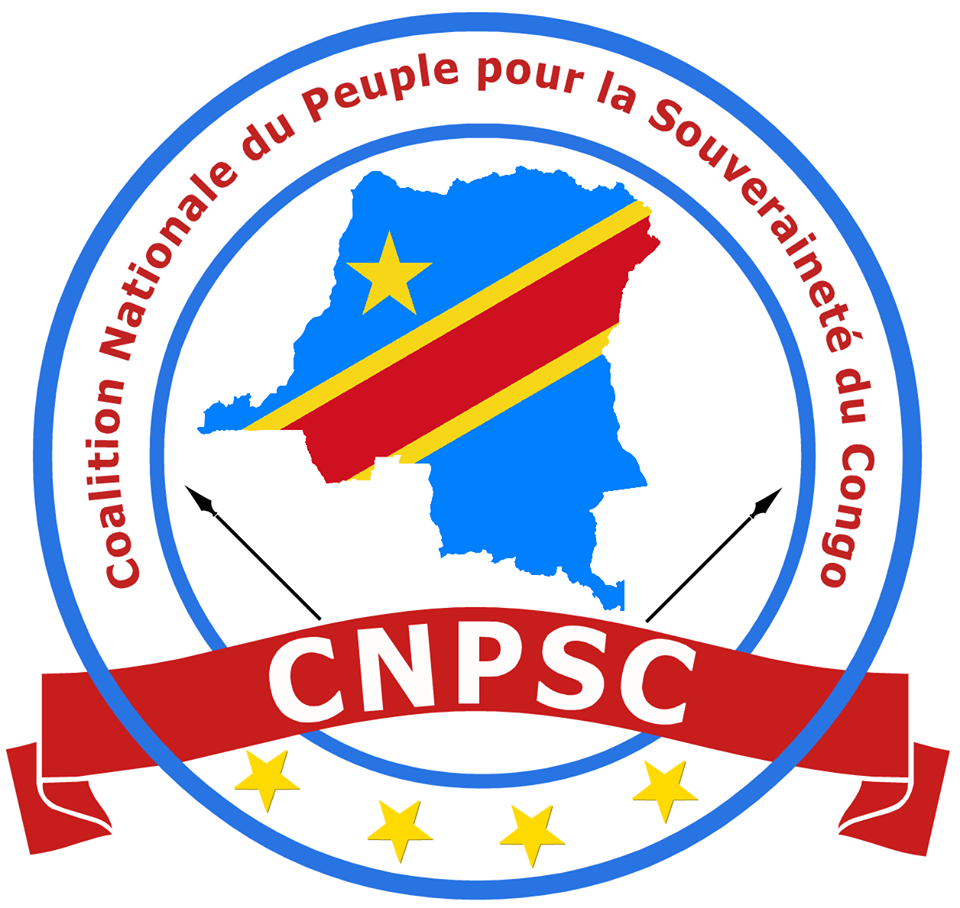
- Logo of the CNPSC.
- Leader: William Yakutumba
- Dates active: 30 June 2017 – present
- Merger of: Mai-Mai Yakutumba; Mai-Mai Malaika; Mai-Mai Ebu Ela and others
- Active regions: South Kivu, Maniema, and Tanganyika provinces
- Size: 10,000 (self-claim); 300–450 (analyst claim)

The National Coalition of the People for the Sovereignty of Congo (French: Coalition Nationale du Peuple pour la Souveraineté du Congo, abbreviated as the CNPSC), and also known as the Alliance of Article 64 (French: l’Alliance de l’Article 64, abbreviated AA64), is an armed rebel coalition in the east of the Democratic Republic of the Congo. The group is a coalition of around 12 different Mai-Mai groups in and around South Kivu province. It was formed on 30 June 2017, symbolically Congolese Independence Day.

The coalition is led primarily by William Yakutumba, a veteran Mai-Mai commander who has been involved in rebellion against the government since 2007. Several other notable commanders play an important role in the coalition, notably Sheh Assani, the leader of Mai-Mai Malaika. The group has vowed to fight for the removal of Congolese President Joseph Kabila and his successor, Félix Tshisekedi. As of 2019, the coalition has also engaged in heavy clashes with the Banyamulenge-led Ngumino and Twiganeho militias.

== Formation ==
While the official announcement of the coalition's formation came in 2017, the idea of the CNPSC had been existent since around 2013. The coalition actually began to form in early 2017, with Yakutumba contacting Mai-Mai leaders around South Kivu. Yakutumba was aided by ex-FARDC General Shabani Sikatenda, who worked to arm Mai-Mai groups and convince them to join up with Yakutumba. Sikatenda was an important factor in the creation of the Mai-Mai Malaika group, as he provided them weapons. Yakutumba additionally brought in commanders which he had fallen out with or had split from his group. These included Réunion Warusasa and Ebu Ela Kitungano. Yakutumba also contacted commanders north of Fizi Territory, the area which his group and most of the CNPSC are based, and is also reported to have entered into an alliance with a Batwa commander in Tanganyika Province.

== Timeline ==
The area of operation of the Mai-Mai groups of the CNPSC, in January 2019: 1. Mai-Mai Yakutumba; 2. Mai-Mai Echilo; 3. Mai-Mai Réunion; 4. Mai-Mai Réné; 5. Mai-Mai Ngalyabatu; 6. Mai-Mai Bishambuke; 7. Mai-Mai Mulumba; 8. Mai-Mai Sheh Assani/Malaika; 9. Mai-Mai Napata

The announcement of the group came on 30 June 2017, with their first attack being on the hydroelectric dam of Force Bendera, a FARDC position. Through this, the coalition was able to acquire a significant amount of supplies and weapons. In the next few days, the CNPSC would attack FARDC positions in major mining sectors, most notably Misisi. Following these attacks, the FARDC was able to beat the coalition back. According to the United Nations, this fighting had displaced 80,000 people. On 27 September, the coalition attacked the town of Mboko, in which troops from Yakutumba's militia as well as those of René Itongwa, Réunion, and Ngarukiye participated. The CNPSC beat back the FARDC and captured the town. The same day, the CNPSC marched on the city of Uvira, in which CNPSC troops and Yakutumba's naval wing took part in a battle against the FARDC. The port and outskirts of the town were captured by the group before they were beat back by forces of MONUSCO. On 2 October, CNPSC rebels ambushed the FARDC and reportedly killed 92.

The FARDC launched a counteroffensive in December. This prompted the CNPSC to attempt to assassinate General Philemon Yav, the overall commander of the counteroffensive, this attack failed, and caused the FARDC to launch an all out attack against the rebels. The FARDC counteroffensive caused significant losses towards the coalition, and forced Yakutumba's troops to temporarily relocate from his base in the Ubwari Peninsula to areas controlled by Mai-Mai Malaika. Yakutumba's naval commander, Ekanda, surrendered on 20 January 2018 to authorities, causing a significant officer loss to the group. Following the counteroffensive, the CNPSC began to lie low and wait for the pressure of the national army to die down.

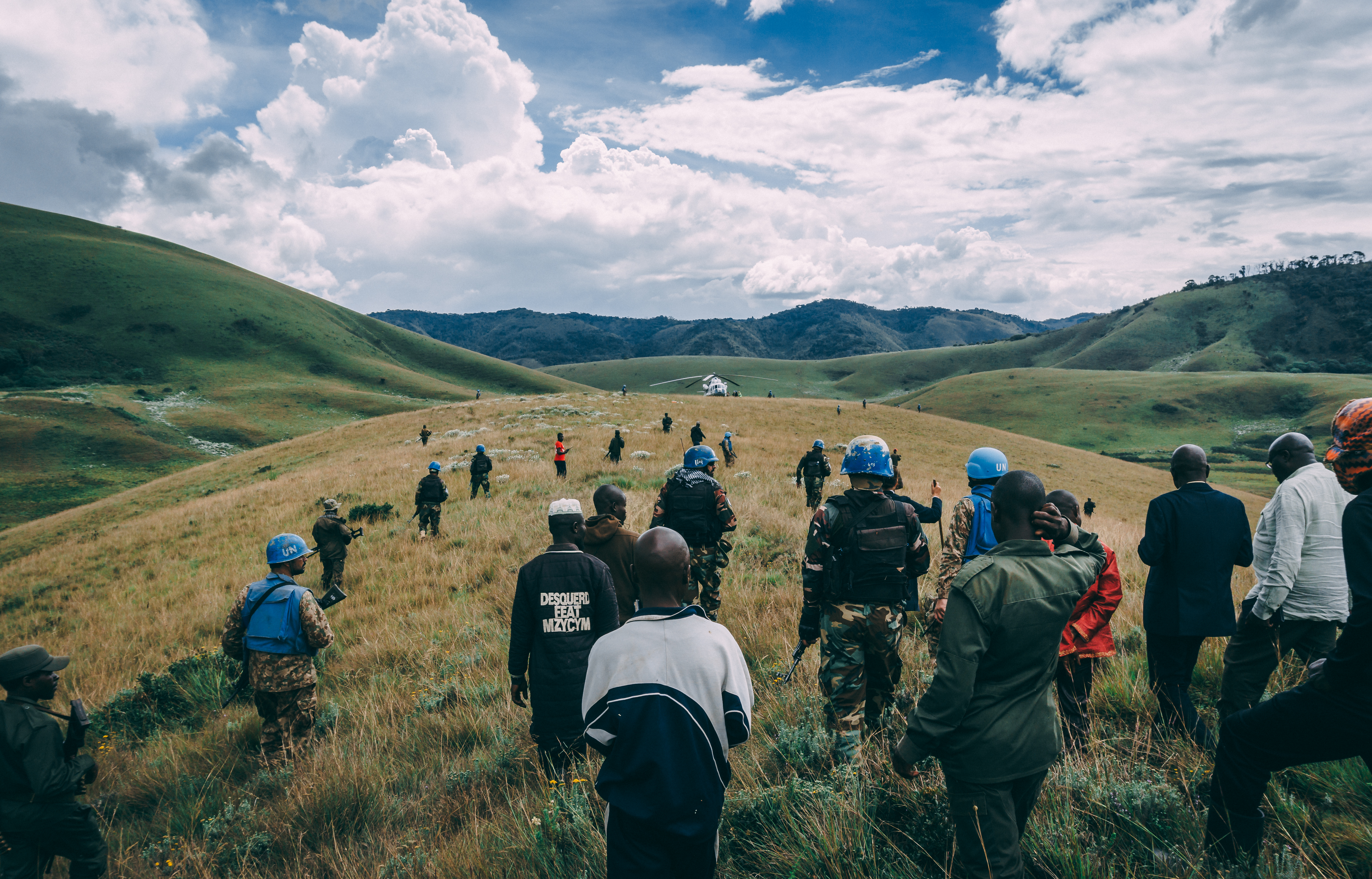
Fighters of the CNPSC with a delegation of MONUSCO peacekeepers, 23 March 2019.

CNPSC activity began again in the summer of 2018, with rebel forces attacking the Namoya Mine on 24 June, making off with weapons and supplies. On 15 September, the CNPSC attacked the FARDC in Kilembwe, and captured the town. The FARDC responded with a counteroffensive and retook Kilembwe. On 2 December, the CNPSC attacked Mboko again and recaptured it. They were pushed out several days later, however. In January 2019, CNPSC commander Ebu Ela surrendered to the FARDC, but many of his troops joined Yakutumba's militia, which had relocated itself back to its original bases.

CNPSC activity had died down throughout much of the first half of 2019, but activity emerged as the coalition entered into conflict with the Ngumino and Twiganeho groups. On 26 July, Mai-Mai Malaika kidnapped workers of the Banro mining corporation. Clashes erupted in late 2019 between the CNPSC and Banyamulenge militia groups, particularly around Minembwe. On 14 October, the CNPSC launched an attack against the FARDC in Minembwe center, which they had captured that same day. On 17 October, the FARDC claimed to have recaptured Minembwe center from the CNPSC, and to have pushed the militia back 40 kilometers. On 30 October, the CNPSC attacked the FARDC at Kabeya and killed two FARDC soldiers. Fighting since then has continued, mainly between the CNPSC and Banyamulenge groups in the area.

== See also ==
- Kivu Conflict
- Mai-Mai
