= Paul Rwarakabije =

Rwandan military officer and former rebel (born 1952)

- Born: 1952 (age 73–74); Gisenyi, Rwanda
- Military career
- Allegiance: Rwanda (1990–1994); Rwanda (2003–2011)
- Branch: National Gendarmerie Headquarters (1990–1994); Rwandan Defence Force (2004–2011)
- Service years: c.1990–2011
- Rank: Major general
- Commands: Kigali mobile group G3 of the National Gendarmerie Headquarters; Alliance for the Liberation of Rwanda; Democratic Forces for the Liberation of Rwanda
- Conflicts: Rwandan Civil War; First Congo War; Second Congo War

Paul Rwarakabije (born 1952) is a Rwandan military officer and former rebel who served as the military leader of the Army for the Liberation of Rwanda (ALiR) and the Democratic Forces for the Liberation of Rwanda (FDLR). He surrendered to Rwanda in 2003 and joined the Rwandan Defence Force (RDF), achieving the rank of major general.

Rwarakabije was a lieutenant colonel in the gendarmerie staff when the Rwandan Civil War broke out, with his unit participating in operations near the Ugandan border. He was repositioned to Kigali in 1992, where he would witness the opening hours of the Rwandan genocide. When the Rwandan Patriotic Front won the war, Rwarakabije and his fighters fled to Zaire, where they would be armed by the government and launch operations against Rwanda. He would go on to serve as the operational chief of the ALiR, and then the FDLR in 2000. He began losing faith in his cause as support from within Rwanda dwindled, and after months of secret negotiations with Rwandan military chief James Kabarebe, surrendered in November 2003. He was reintegrated into the RDF the following year, and served as Commissioner General of Rwanda Correctional Service after retiring in 2011.

== Early life and education ==
Rwarakabije was born in Gisenyi in 1952. A Hutu, he graduated from the École Supérieure Militaire in Kigali before pursuing advanced training courses in Zaire, France, and Belgium throughout the 1970s and 1980s. His training included Special Forces training by Belgian officers at the Kota-Koli camp in Zaire.

== Career ==
=== Rwandan Civil War ===
After completing his studies, Rwarakabije was assigned to the gendarmerie staff. From 1990 to 1992, he served as commander of the Kigali mobile group, with the rank of lieutenant colonel. In October 1990, while he held this command, the Rwandan Civil War broke out between the Rwandan Patriotic Front (RPF) and the Rwandan Armed Forces (FAR). Rwarakabije's unit participated in operations on the Ugandan border, between Ruhengeri and Akagera National Park. In July 1992, he was repositioned to Kigali and put in charge of the G3 of the National Gendarmerie Headquarters, responsible for training, operations, and organization. On 6 April 1994, he witnessed the assassination of president Juvénal Habyarimana on live television and the opening hours of the Rwandan genocide. During the genocide, he continued to serve in the military's high command, although the Human Rights Watch reported that he "served in units less implicated in genocidal killing and reportedly ha[s] not been accused of wrongdoing". In the second week of July 1994, Rwarakabije's superior, Augustin Bizimungu, determined in a meeting that the war was lost to the RPF, and ordered his forces to flee.

Rwarakabije had already been retreating since 3 July, when the RPF entered the suburbs of Kigali. He led his gendarmerie toward Ginseyi, where they would cross the border into Zaire on 17 July and settle at a Hutu refugee camp near Goma. There, he remained under the command of Bizimungu, who unified the ex-FAR fighters into a single force, with the goal of returning to power in Rwanda. At Katale camp, he served as its brigade commander and recruited Rwandan Hutu with the message that "if you go home, the Tutsis will kill you", despite many Hutu who returned to Rwanda being reintegrated into their communities. His fighters were armed by Congolese dictator Mobutu Sese Seko.

=== Congo Wars ===
After the outbreak of the First Congo War, the Hutu refugee camps were destroyed by the Rwandan military in 1996, and many Hutu fled westward. In November 1997, a joint force made up of the FPR and several African armies launched an invasion of Zaire, first into the east and then the south. Mobutu was overthrown as a result, and replaced by Laurent-Désiré Kabila. Rwarakabije was the operations chief of the Army for the Liberation of Rwanda (ALiR) and the operational commander in the insurgency against Rwanda, however his leadership was contested by hardliner Sylvestre Mudacumura, commander of the ALiR II. Leading a weakened unit of 1,000 men based near Katale, he was unable to resist the offensive and fled to Masisi, where he sought to strengthen his army. By the end of 1997, he had recruited ex-FAR members, Interahamwes, and refugees, and had a sufficient number of fighters to launch an insurgency into Rwanda, known as the "war of infiltration". His men invaded into Kibuye, Gitarama, and even the suburbs of Kigali, killing Tutsis wherever they were found. The insurgency killed over 10,000 fighters and civilians. Eventually, Rwarakabije's forces ran out of weapons and were forced to retreat back to the Democratic Republic of the Congo (DRC) following a counteroffensive by the FPR in the summer of 1998.

In Kinshasa, Kabila turned against the Rwandan army and allied with Hutu forces. His son, Joseph Kabila, was appointed the military's operational commander, and rearmed Rwarakabije's forces. These events led to the outbreak of the Second Congo War in August 1998, and Rwandan forces invaded the DRC, occupying much of its east. During the war, Rwarakabije attempted to resurface, serving on behalf of the Congolese government. By the end of the year, he received nearly 6,000 reinforcements from the Republic of the Congo, and 600 others from the Central African Republic who were sent to North Kivu. Joseph Kabila sent a satellite phone to Rwarakabije's base in Masisi to allow him to coordinate his forces' movements with the Congolese Armed Forces. In the meantime, Rwarakabije was in talks with the Democratic Forces for the Liberation of Rwanda (FDLR), and on 30 September 2000, the ALiR was merged into the FDLR with Rwarakabije as its commander-in-chief, on the condition that the ALiR accept the organization's political leadership.

In 2001, Laurent-Désiré Kabila was assassinated by his bodyguard and succeeded by Joseph. Later in May, Rwarakabije launched Operation Lord's Oracle, an invasion of Rwanda from the Lake Kivu area; however, the offensive failed due to a lack of support and war-weariness from the Hutu population. Rwarakabije began to have a shift in his attitude towards Rwanda when the Rwandan government captured over 1,700 of his men during the offensive, and instead of executing them, sent them to rehabilitation camps and reintegrated them into society. The following year, a peace treaty was signed between the DRC and Rwanda that ended the Congolese government's official support for the FDLR.

In 2003, while the FDLR was preparing for another offensive against Rwanda, he dispatched a spy into the nation to speak with families of his soldiers and others who initially supported his cause. As a result, he figured out that the people had lost support for the war. In July of that year, the FDLR launched a final offensive of 1,000–2,000 fighters into Rwanda, seeking to disrupt the presidential election. At this time, he had been in indirect contact with Rwandan military chief of staff James Kabarebe for several months, and in October, made his decision to surrender via the satellite phone provided by Kabila.

=== Surrender ===
On 15 November 2003, Rwarakabije crossed the Rwandan border with 103 fighters, who disarmed themselves in Cyangugu. After his arrival, he was flown to Kigali via a military helicopter, where he was greeted by Kabarebe. Upon his arrival at Kigali International Airport, Rwarakabije said: "We have decided to put down guns. War is not the best solution."

Most FDLR rebels, numbering between 13,000 and 20,000, remained in the DRC after his surrender. However, his surrender was a blow to the organization's structure. At the time, its leadership was already fractured when FDLR president Ignace Murwanashyaka was excluded from a September 2003 meeting of its Congress in Amsterdam, which he alleged was intentional. Rwarakabije's surrender was seen as evidence of the incumbent leadership's incompetence, and Murwanashyaka was deposed by the FDLR executive council and replaced by his vice president, Jean-Marie Higiro. As a result, the organization split into separate blocs centered around the two.

=== Post-surrender ===
==== Trial ====
Rwarakabije had been listed among one million Hutus wanted by Gacaca courts for alleged involvement in the Rwandan genocide before he surrendered. He was accused of killing several people taking refuge at his home and others at the Gendarmerie headquarters in Kacyiru, but was acquitted on 25 July 2009 by the Gacaca court in Kacyiru due to a lack of evidence provided by the witnesses.

==== Reintegration into the military ====
He was reintegrated into the Rwandan Defence Force (RDF) in July 2004 alongside three other former rebel leaders as a major general, and later served on the Rwanda Demobilisation and Reintegration Commission. In November 2009, he urged his compatriots still fighting in the DRC to surrender as he did, while adding that the arrests of FDLR leader Ignace Murwanashyaka and vice president Stratton Musoni in Germany were due to the organization's "unacceptable actions" in the DRC. After retiring from the RDF, he was appointed Commissioner General of Rwanda Correctional Service in 2011.
