= Eastern Congo offensives (2009–2012) =

2009–2012 Eastern Congo offensives
- Part of the Kivu conflict and the Allied Democratic Forces insurgency
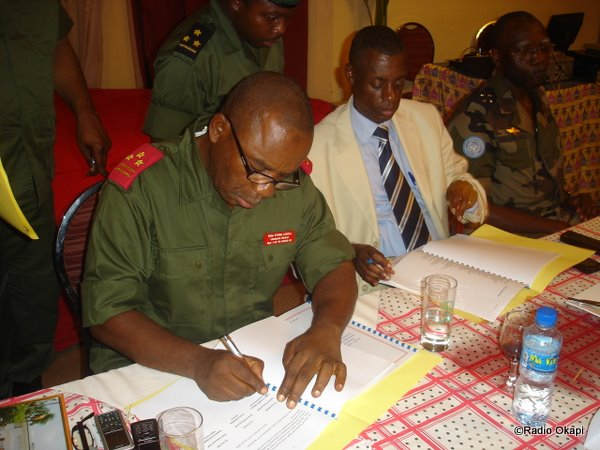
- The FARDC and RDF chiefs of staff, Didier Etumba and James Kabarebe, assessing Operation Kimia II in January 2010
Date	20 January 2009 – 25 February 2009; 2 March 2009 – 31 December 2009; 1 January 2010 – 11 April 2012
Location	Kivu, Democratic Republic of the Congo
Result	Congolese–Rwandan strategic failure: FDLR and ADF temporarily weakened but still intact; CNDP rebels integrated into the Congolese military from March 2009 until April 2012

Belligerents
DR Congo; Rwanda (United Nations) MONUC	FDLR; Various Mai-Mai ADF (from 2010) CNDP elements (2009)

Commanders and leaders
(Democratic Republic of the Congo) Joseph Kabila (Democratic Republic of the Congo) Didier Etumba (Democratic Republic of the Congo) John Numbi (Democratic Republic of the Congo) Dieudonné Amuli Bahigwa (Democratic Republic of the Congo) (Rwanda) Bosco Ntaganda (Democratic Republic of the Congo) Vainqueur Mayala (Democratic Republic of the Congo) Pacifique Masunzu (Democratic Republic of the Congo) Delphin Kahimbi (Rwanda) Paul Kagame (Rwanda) James Kabarebe (United Nations) Babacar Gaye (United Nations) Chander Prakash	Sylvestre Mudacumura; Ignace Murwanashyaka; Leodomir Mugaragu †; Pacifique Ntawunguka; Evariste Kanzeguhera †; Anaclet Hitimana †; Edmond Ngarambe (POW); Eli Mutarambirwa (POW) Jamil Mukulu Laurent Nkunda (POW)

Strength
(Democratic Republic of the Congo) 60,000 soldiers (Rwanda) 4,500 soldiers (United Nations) 9,000+ peacekeepers	6,000–6,500 fighters Mai-Mai: 2,000+ fighters 600–1,300 fighters

Casualties and losses
Per DRC or MONUC: (Democratic Republic of the Congo) 211+ killed, 200+ injured, 27+ missing (Rwanda) Unknown (United Nations) 3 killed	Per DRC or MONUC: 2,481 killed, 2,547 repatriated to Rwanda
- 1,400+ civilians killed, 960,000+ internally displaced in the DRC, and 11,577+ repatriated to Rwanda

Five offensives were launched in the Kivu region of the eastern Democratic Republic of the Congo (DRC) between 2009 and 2012 by the Armed Forces of the DRC (FARDC) with logistical support from the United Nations Mission (MONUC). Three offensives were directed against the Democratic Forces for the Liberation of Rwanda (FDLR), one of which was a joint operation with the Rwandan Defence Force (RDF) that also targeted elements of the National Congress for the Defence of the People (CNDP). Two offensives targeted the Allied Democratic Forces (ADF). The campaign weakened the FDLR and the ADF but did not achieve their objective of eliminating them. An agreement was reached to integrate the CNDP into the FARDC in 2009, but it broke down in 2012 when some former CNDP members mutinied, formed the March 23 Movement (M23), and began a rebellion.

The eastern DRC remained unstable since the end of the Second Congo War in 2003 because of Laurent Nkunda's Rwandan-backed CNDP rebels challenging President Joseph Kabila's government. Nkunda claimed that he was protecting Congolese Tutsis from the Rwandan Hutu FDLR extremists, which he said were supported by the Kabila government, but both groups committed widespread atrocities against civilians, as did the FARDC. When the FARDC's unsuccessful offensive against the CNDP between August and October 2008 nearly led to the fall of the North Kivu provincial capital Goma, the United States and other international actors arranged negotiations between the governments of Kabila and Rwandan President Paul Kagame. On 5 December 2008, the DRC and Rwanda announced plans to launch Operation Umoja Wetu ("Our Unity" in Swahili) as a joint offensive against the FDLR by their forces, and to start peace talks between the CNDP and the Kabila government. Kabila and Kagame reached an agreement on the arrest of Nkunda in return for an operation against the FDLR.

Umoja Wetu began on 20 January 2009 when RDF troops crossed the Congolese border into North Kivu. RDF columns assisted by FARDC brigades moved through the province and destroyed the FDLR's main bases near Kibua, Walikale Territory. However, the group dispersed its fighters into the forests and hills of North Kivu, and an attempt by the FARDC–RDF coalition to encircle and cause a mass surrender of the FDLR's command was unsuccessful. The operation was declared over on 25 February 2009, and temporarily reduced the group's capabilities, but it resumed attacks on civilians and on the FARDC a month after the end of Umoja Wetu. The FARDC, with logistical support from MONUC, launched another campaign against the FDLR known as Operation Kimia II ("Silence") on 2 March. Military action was expanded into South Kivu, which was where the group had moved its headquarters during Umoja Wetu. The 23 March 2009 agreement between the government and the CNDP led to the integration of the latter's members into the FARDC, and they were deployed in Kimia II.

Kimia II ended on 31 December 2009, after international and domestic criticism that the operations that year caused immense harm to civilians. The FDLR carried out reprisal attacks on civilians, and the FARDC was increasingly undisciplined after the integration former CNDP fighters. Although the FARDC–MONUC coalition destroyed several FDLR bases, it failed to dismantle the group's command structure. Operation Amani Leo ("Peace Today") was launched on 1 January 2010, during which MONUC imposed new conditions on the Congolese military in return for its support, as an effort to reduce human rights violations. But this had the effect of the FARDC undertaking most actions on its own, and the operation still failed to neutralize the radical core of FDLR fighters or the group's command. On 25 June 2010, after the ADF militia attacked a military camp, the FARDC began Operation Ruwenzori against the group, which lived in the Ruwenzori Mountains, with MONUC support. Despite some tactical successes, the operations did not prevent the FDLR or ADF from continuing reprisal attacks against civilians.

Rwanda deployed special forces troops into eastern Congo in February 2011. Although some senior FDLR officers were killed or captured, the group withdrew deeper into the country. The ADF also remained active. On 8 March 2012, the FARDC and MONUSCO announced Operation Radi Strike, also directed against the ADF. On 11 April 2012, Kabila declared the end of all combat operations in the east, which included both Amani Leo and Radi Strike, after the government's attempt to arrest Bosco Ntaganda and redeploy units of former CNDP fighters to other parts of the country caused a mutiny. The mutineers accused the government of breaking the 23 March agreement, and formed the March 23 Movement in May 2012.

== Background ==
The Second Congo War officially ended in 2003 with a ceasefire, the withdrawal of Rwandan and Ugandan troops from the Democratic Republic of the Congo (DRC), and the creation of a transitional government to reunify the country. An integration process began to merge the warring parties—the Rally for Congolese Democracy–Goma (RCD–Goma), the Movement for the Liberation of the Congo (MLC), President Joseph Kabila's Congolese Armed Forces (FAC), and various Mai-Mai groups—into a new national army, the Armed Forces of the Democratic Republic of the Congo (FARDC). However, fighting continued in the eastern DRC.

A group of Tutsi RCD officers led by Brigadier Laurent Nkunda felt that they had been marginalized during the DRC's political transition and refused to integrate, along with forces loyal to them. Goma, in the DRC's North Kivu province, became the base of RCD dissidents. When the transitional government appointed new ex-FAC regional commanders in South Kivu, some RCD officers refused to recognize them, and their dispute became violent in Bukavu in May 2004. Government forces killed Tutsi civilians during the fighting, who were perceived as a Rwandan fifth column. In response, Nkunda led his troops to capture Bukavu on 2 June 2004, who then committed indiscriminate atrocities against civilians. He withdrew on 11 June because of international pressure on the RCD and Rwanda, but after a massacre of Congolese Tutsis on 13 August, Nkunda claimed that a genocide was taking place.

Among the most significant armed groups present in the eastern DRC were the Democratic Forces for the Liberation of Rwanda (FDLR), which were estimated to have from 6,000 to 6,500 fighters in late 2008. Led by members of the former Hutu government in Rwanda that had been involved in the Rwandan genocide in 1994, it was perceived by the current Rwandan government as both a political and economic threat. Its presence in the DRC had been one of the reasons for Rwanda's invasions during the First and Second Congo Wars between 1996 and 2003, and those conflicts were also used by Rwanda to establish coordinated exploitation of the DRC's mineral wealth. The FDLR were used by the Congolese government to fight Rwandan and Rwandan-backed rebel forces.

After the 2006 general election created a political structure in North Kivu that was unfavorable for the RCD, Rwanda gave its permission for local Tutsi leaders to support Nkunda, who established the National Congress for the Defence of the People (CNDP) on 30 December 2006. Nkunda's forces had previously launched attacks against the FDLR that resulted in many civilian casualties, leading to retaliatory attacks by the FDLR that also killed civilians, and he decided to expand his "crusade" by creating the CNDP. Nkunda's actions caused increased tension across the eastern DRC, from southern Ituri, through North and South Kivu, down to northern Katanga. The Congolese government issued an arrest warrant for Nkunda in September 2005, but initially pursued a strategy of appeasement during the FARDC's integration process. Nkunda consolidated his control over the 81st and 83rd Brigades of the former RCD, and recruited or press ganged Congolese Tutsis. The CNDP grew into one of the most powerful armed groups in the DRC, partly due to Rwandan support.

Nkunda stated that his goal was to protect Congolese Tutsis by fighting against the FDLR, which he claimed was supported by the Kabila government. Pro-government forces saw Nkunda and the CNDP as defending Rwandan interests. There were multiple clashes and negotiations between the Kabila government and the CNDP between 2006 and 2008. The FARDC had launched a total of five offensives against the group since 2004. As of January 2008, at least 800,000 people were internally displaced in North Kivu and another 100,000 in South Kivu, more than at any time since 2003, and the region's population continued to suffer from atrocities, including sexual violence. Various peace efforts culminated in the Nairobi agreement on 7 November 2007 between the DRC and Rwanda, for the disarmament of the FDLR and repatriation of its members, and the Goma agreement between the government and a collection of armed groups, including the CNDP, on 23 January 2008. The terms of the Goma agreement were based on the integration of rebels with the government, the restoration of state authority, and the return of refugees.

However, by June 2008 the agreement was breaking down, with at least 190 ceasefire violations recorded by the United Nations Mission in the Democratic Republic of the Congo (MONUC) since the Goma conference. The Congolese government wanted to make use of other militia groups to weaken the CNDP, and fighting was breaking out between several of them. But the CNDP's main concern was that the government, including Kabila and National Assembly speaker Vital Kamerhe, refused to pass a sweeping amnesty for war crimes and crimes against humanity committed by the rebels. The government did not want to encourage impunity, and these crimes were also the jurisdiction of the International Criminal Court (ICC). Nkunda's top commander Bosco Ntaganda already had an ICC warrant. There were also disagreements between the DRC and Rwanda on which FDLR members were genocidaires that had to be repatriated, and the FARDC was believed to not have the military capability to fully defeat the group.

== Prelude ==
After the DRC made another commitment to disarm the FDLR in the Nairobi agreement, on 15 January 2008 the Congolese government gave the group an ultimatum to do so before 15 March. Minister of Defense and Veterans Chikez Diemu said that after the deadline they would be disarmed by force. FARDC chief of staff Lt. Gen. Dieudonné Kayembe and MONUC commander Lt. Gen. Babacar Gaye began planning a military operation against the FDLR in late November 2007. Kayembe met with Rwandan Defence Force (RDF) chief of staff Gen. James Kabarebe on 16 March 2008, and they agreed to not provide assistance to groups that undermine either state, referring to the FDLR and the CNDP. On 21 April, the FARDC launched Operation Kimia with the support of MONUC, attacking FDLR positions in the Rutshuru Territory. The peace agreement with the CNDP had completely broken down by August, and the FARDC launched its sixth offensive against the CNDP on 28 August, which eventually ended Operation Kimia.

Some of the FARDC brigades that had been created by the integration process since 2004 were reasonably well integrated, but they collapsed during the fighting with CNDP in late 2008, and some soldiers deserted to rejoin their rebel groups. In an offensive launched on 26 October, the CNDP captured the Rumangabo military base in North Kivu and reached within 20 kilometers of Goma, the provincial capital. The town of Rutshuru was also captured, and the CNDP doubled the size of its territory. Goma was abandoned by the FARDC, and the fighting displaced an additional 250,000 people in the province. Both sides committed war crimes. On 11 November, Kabila replaced Kayembe as chief of staff with Lt. Gen. Didier Etumba, who said he would address the acts of indiscipline committed by the FARDC in North Kivu, the siphoning of soldiers' pay and rations, and low morale. Although the 8th Military Region, responsible for North Kivu, was commanded by Brig. Gen. Vainqueur Mayala, Kabila and his senior officers were extensively involved in the direct command of the operations, often bypassing the regular command structure by giving orders to brigade and battalion commanders by satellite phone.

The "Goma crisis" of autumn 2008 led to a turnaround in diplomatic relations between the DRC and Rwanda. When the personal relationship between Kabila and Kagame was at an all time low, in September US Assistant Secretary of State for African Affairs Jendayi Frazer submitted a peace proposal to the Congolese and Rwandan delegations at the UN, which included a joint military operation against the FDLR. From October, there was "intense diplomatic activity" by African, European, US, and Chinese diplomats directed at DR Congo and Rwanda to stop Nkunda from taking Goma, the fall of which threatened to destabilize Kabila's government and ruin the credibility of the UN mission. Nkunda, who since mid-2008 was more interested in Congolese national politics than the safety of Tutsis, was increasingly seen as a liability by Kagame, and Rwanda was under pressure from its European partners to end its support for the CNDP. This created the circumstances for Kabila and Kagame to reach a rapprochement.

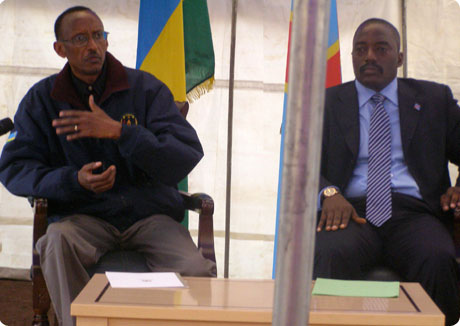
Rwandan President Paul Kagame and DRC President Joseph Kabila in Goma in August 2009.

A series of meetings between Congolese and Rwandan officials took place. Kabila and Kagame met on 7 November in Nairobi, Kenya, which resulted in a secret agreement between them on the basis of US proposal. They also agreed that Nkunda would be removed at the same time as the attack on FDLR. In return, the CNDP would be integrated into the Congolese military, which would give the group influence over southern North Kivu's "Petit Nord" region (Goma and the territories of Rutshuru, Masisi, and Walikale). Starting from November, Kabila's advisor and national police chief John Numbi began working with James Kabarebe to arrange the replacement of Nkunda with his subordinate, Ntaganda. On 5 December 2008, Congolese and Rwandan foreign ministers Alexis Thambwe Mwamba and Rosemary Museminali met in Goma and announced in a joint communique that their countries intend to launch a joint anti-FDLR operation, Umoja Wetu ("Our Unity" in Swahili), and to start direct talks between the CNDP and the Kabila administration.

Further meetings took place after the announcement. On 9 December, the US organized a meeting in Kigali for the "tripartite plus one" mechanism, consisting of the defense ministers of the DRC, Rwanda, Uganda, and Burundi. On 14 December, Ugandan People's Defence Force (UPDF) troops entered the Orientale province of eastern Congo for a surprise offensive against the Lord's Resistance Army (LRA) with Congolese and South Sudanese forces. Talks to arrange Rwanda's participation in Operation Umoja Wetu took place on 30 December 2008 in Kigali, between Congolese and Rwandan defense ministers Charles Mwando and Marcel Gatsinzi. On 9 January 2009, the plans for the Umoja Wetu operation and Nkunda were discussed in Kinshasa by the chiefs of staff, Etumba and Kabarabe, along with Numbi and Kabila. On 16 January, Ntaganda won over the majority of the CNDP's officers and promised to integrate the group with the FARDC. Kabila and Kagame worked to limit the involvement of the international community in the resolution of the situation, because Rwanda always officially denied supporting the CNDP, and because Ntaganda had an ICC arrest warrant. FDLR fighters began to conduct reconnaissance in the forests of Kivu to prepare to evade the attackers, and during a meeting at the group's military headquarters on 5 January, they decided to respond to Umoja Wetu by dispersing their members.

== Operation Umoja Wetu ==
=== Order of battle ===
As of November 2008 the FARDC had 20,000 troops deployed in the Kivus, including 10,000 on the North Kivu front line. North Kivu is the FARDC's 8th Military Region, and as of December 2008, Axis North was the FARDC tactical headquarters for operations in the province. A joint FARDC–RDF command center was established in Goma for Operation Uomja Wetu, led by Gen. John Numbi. MONUC, whose new mandate from December 2008 required it to protect the Congolese population from any armed threat, had limited access to information from the Congolese or Rwadan forces. Though MONUC was not directly involved, it sent a liaison team to the FARDC–RDF joint headquarters on 27 January 2009, and they had to negotiate by offering logistical support to the FARDC in return for more information.

Known FARDC units in North Kivu, December 2008
HQ	Unit	Note
Axis North HQ	Republican Guard Company	
Axis North HQ	Special Battalion	Shingamitwe
Axis North HQ	802nd Field Artillery Battalion	Goma
Axis North HQ	Military Police Battalion	
Axis North HQ	2nd (Integrated) Brigade	Kaseye
Axis North HQ	6th (Integrated) Brigade	Kamandi
Axis North HQ	7th (Integrated) Brigade	Rwindi
Axis North HQ	9th (Integrated) Brigade	Butalongola
Axis North HQ	10th (Integrated) Brigade	Beni
Axis North HQ	15th (Integrated) Brigade	Kbasha
Axis North HQ	18th (Integrated) Brigade	Between Kibati and Kilimanyoka
Axis North HQ	20th Brigade	Homba. Formed in February 2009 from ex-CNDP and FARDC.
Axis North HQ	81st (Non-integrated) Brigade	Katale/Masisi
Axis North HQ	82nd (Non-integrated) Brigade	Mobambiro
Axis North HQ	83rd (Non-integrated) Brigade	Rumangabo
Axis North HQ	85th (Non-integrated) Brigade	Bisie, Walikale

Three Rwandan intelligence battalions were deployed for the FARDC–RDF joint operation, and they had a strength of 4,500 soldiers.

The strength of the FDLR in North Kivu was estimated at 3,000 fighters. The group's president, Ignace Murwanashyaka, was living in exile in Germany but controlled the group's movements during the operation by satellite phone. Its commander on the ground was Gen. Sylvestre Mudacumura, whose headquarters was in Kibua, Walikale Territory.

FDLR units in North Kivu
HQ	Unit	Note
FDLR Command	1st Reserve Brigade	Kibua, Masisi
FDLR Command	Montana Battalion	Kashebere
FDLR Command	Sabena Battalion	Pinga
FDLR Command	Bahamas Battalion	Between Nyamilima and Ishasa
FDLR Command	Someka Battalion	Bingi
FDLR Command	RUD-Uranana Battalion	Bingi

=== Timeline ===
Map of Operation Umoja Wetu.

The operation began on 20 January 2009, when the first force of RDF troops crossed into the DRC. Three columns moved through Goma and spread out to the north and west of the city. The first RDF column passed the town of Rutshuru, north of Goma, and moved to the border of Uganda and the DRC, where Laurent Nkunda and his group of loyalists were located at Jomba. Nkunda was able to escape and made it across the Rwandan border into Gisenyi, where he was arrested by the RDF on the night of 22–23 January. Negotiations began with Rwanda for the extradition of Nkunda, who was wanted in the DRC for war crimes committed in South Kivu in June 2004, while Kabila was pressured to send Bosco to the ICC.

The second RDF column also passed Rutshuru, but went in the opposite direction to the Virunga National Park, advancing in the direction of Pingu. The final column moved west of Goma towards Sake began fighting the FDLR's 1st reserve brigade on 25 January, in the first combat with FDLR during Umoja Wetu. FDLR spokesman Lt. Col. Edmond Ngarambe claimed that some Rwandan and Congolese had been injured in ambush, while the FARDC said that nine militants had been killed. The fighting occurred in Kibua, near the provincial border with South Kivu. The FDLR's military headquarters was located in the area, and was protected by the 1st reserve brigade.

The FDLR abandoned the Kibua camp, but the reserve brigade's deputy commander, Lt. Col. Anaclet Hitimana, was killed on 28 January in an RDF ambush. The FDLR abducted civilians in Kibua to use as human shields, and also killed many with blades, while some died in the crossfire. On 10 February, Rwanda's minister of defense said that the FDLR's main bases had been destroyed. At the same time the FARDC moved into positions in the Rutshuru area that had been lost to CNDP fighters during the 2008 campaign. In late January the FARDC brought the Walikale under control from the non-integrated 85th Brigade, which had colluded with the FDLR to exploit the mineral resources at Bisie, by flying FARDC and RDF soldiers to the area.

At the start of the second week, RDF troops moved ahead on their own while the seven FARDC integrated brigades struggled to follow, having logistical difficulties despite MONUC support. The FDLR dispersed into small groups, with some fighters and their families fleeing into South Kivu, while others hid in the forests and foothills of North Kivu's Virunga National Park, or along its provincial borders with Orientale and Maniema. On 31 January, the RDF group that went after Nkunda was able to push back the "Bahamas" battalion of the FDLR in the Virunga National Park, in effect securing the entire length of the DRC's border with Uganda and Rwanda.

Kagame said in an interview on 30 January that the goal of the operation was the destabilize the FDLR, arrest the genocidaires of the 1994 genocide, and reintegrate the other combatants with Rwandan society. Kabila said on 31 January that the operation will not last beyond February. Although locals in North Kivu were not hostile towards the RDF troops, the Rwandan deployment into eastern Congo became a sensitive issue in Congolese politics, where many were suspicious of Rwanda's intentions. In early February, students demonstrated in Kinshasa, and 260 National Assembly MPs signed a petition calling for more openness about the agreement between Kabila and Kagame.

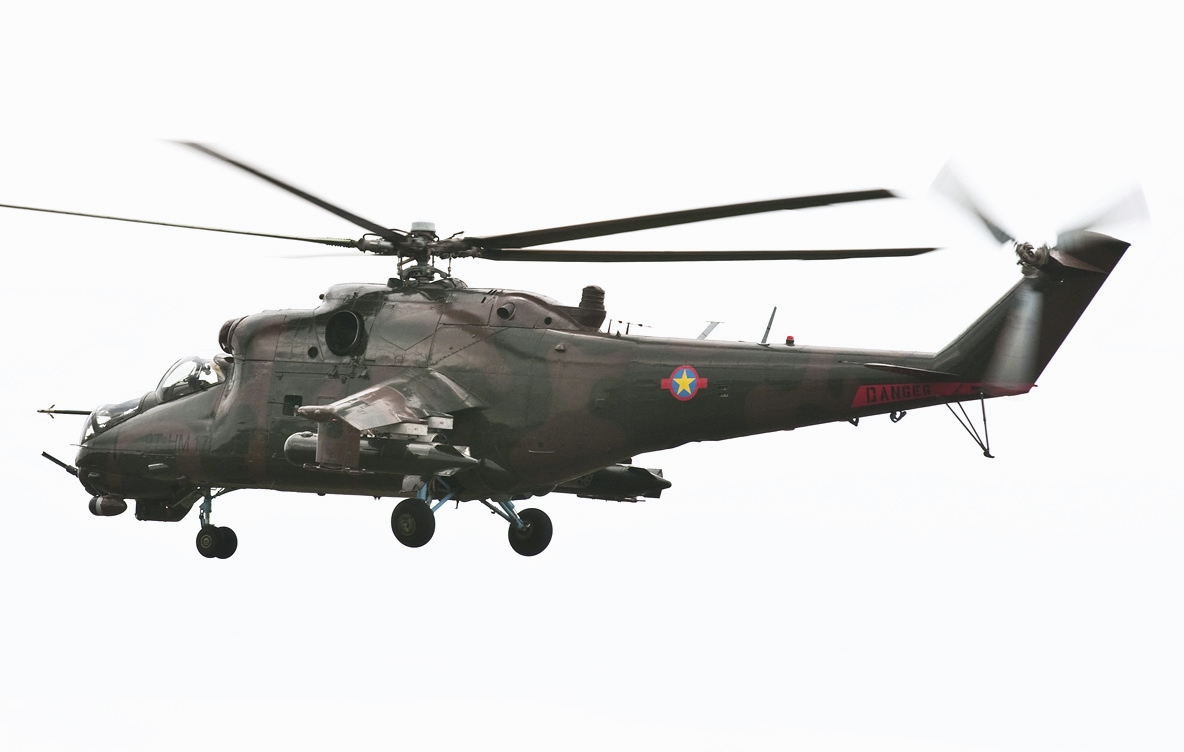
A Congolese Air Force Mil Mi-24 similar to the one that was used during the operation.

The FARDC captured FDLR spokesman Ngarambe in early February and repatriated him to Rwanda. The RDF engaged the FDLR's "Sabena" battalion near Pinga, and it withdrew into the hills on 12 February. The RDF stayed in the village for two days and fired mortars to disperse the militants. After they left, the FDLR returned to Pinga and committed atrocities against the civilians as reprisals. Although Mudacumura and his headquarters staff had evacuated from Kibua to Bunyakiri in South Kivu, the FARDC–RDF force sent to Walikale went east to secure that area. After taking the FDLR's former positions in Kibua they continued to the Nyabiondo-Kashebere-Kibati area near Masisi, where the RDF converged from three directions. The coalition intended to force the FDLR into trap and get them to surrender. Fighting in this area began on 10 February, and on 12 February a Congolese Air Force Mil Mi-24 helicopter fired rockets near Kashebere, the center of the "Montana" battalion. MONUC evacuated the village's 4,000 residents on 13 February, and by the 15th, the RDF was able to get control of Kashebere and Nyabiondo with air support from the FARDC helicopter. The next day it took control of Kibati.

The fighting in the Nyabiondo-Kashebere-Kibati area failed to get the FDLR to surrender, and the FARDC deployed the majority of its forces to the area from 21 February. The FARDC's 81st Brigade looted Kashebere after it was evacuated by MONUC. On the 21st, the RDF was ordered to end the offensive and return to Goma. There, Umoja Wetu officially ended on 25 February 2009 during a ceremony involving hundreds of Rwandan and Congolese soldiers and officers, and the defense and foreign ministers of the two countries. Operational commander John Numbi said that 85% of the objective was achieved; that the FDLR was weakened, setting it up for its surrender and repatriation to Rwanda; and that there will be an expanded campaign into South Kivu.

=== Assessment ===
Operation Umoja Wetu was considered a political success for Kabila. Vital Kamerhe, who had criticized Kabila's decision to allow the Rwandan deployment, was removed as the speaker of the National Assembly by MPs from the Alliance of the Presidential Majority. Kagame restored his international credibility, which had been damaged by Rwanda's support for the CNDP. According to the UN, about 5,000 Rwandan FDLR combatants and their family members were repatriated back to Rwanda since the start of the year, a tenfold increase compared to the year before. Although the group suffered a loss of cohesion and strategically important territory, it was a temporary defeat, and the casualties of both the FDLR and the coalition were light due to the limited fighting during the 35-day operation. Those that chose to be repatriated to Rwanda tended to be more recently recruited and younger members who had no real belief that the FDLR would retake the country, while the older generation that was in positions of power remained in North Kivu. A month after the end of Umoja Wetu, the FDLR command reasserted control over its members, attacked FARDC positions, and launched reprisals against civilians.

The government and the CNDP signed a peace agreement on 23 March 2009, facilitated by UN and African Union envoys Olusegun Obasanjo and Benjamin Mkapa. The CNDP had about 8,000 fighters, who began their integration into the FARDC from 16 January, along with some other groups such as PARECO and various Mai-Mai. In total, as many as 18,000 combatants were integrated into the FARDC within a few weeks of "accelerated integration," and it was done without removing commanders that were suspected of committing war crimes. The integration created numerous problems, including disputes over the ranks and deployment location of the former CNDP, and over the payment of salaries. On 6 March 2009, the UN noted a decline in security in North Kivu after the withdrawal of the RDF and the deployment of ex-CNDP newly integrated FARDC brigades for the continued campaign against the FDLR, including an increase in sex crimes committed by FARDC soldiers.

== Operation Kimia II ==
=== Order of battle ===
The FARDC operational command for Kimia II was led by Maj. Gen. Dieudonné Amuli Bahigwa (appointed on 7 April 2009), and existed separately from the FARDC's regional command structure. Separate headquarters existed for Kimia II in North and South Kivu, overseeing Operational Zones 1 and 2, and Operational Zones 3 and 4, respectively. They existed parallel to the 8th and 10th military regions, the latter commanded by Gen. Pacifique Masunzu. Bosco Ntaganda, who on 16 January was integrated as a general of the FARDC, reportedly became a deputy commander. Under an agreement with MONUC, the UN forces provided campaign rations, fuel, medical evacuation, and air and artillery strikes on request from the FARDC operational command.

In early 2009, the former CNDP and other rebels either formed new units (e.g. 20th Brigade), or were merged with the FARDC's existing integrated and non-integrated brigades, spread out among them at the platoon and company level. Some of the existing brigades (e.g. 18th Integrated Brigade) were dissolved to become part of new CNDP-majority brigades. FARDC units were reorganized, renumbered, and redeployed multiple times during the year, in part to restore MONUC support after it was cut to certain units whose members committed war crimes. The renumbered brigades included troops that went through the original 2004–2008 brassage (integration) process, and non-brassaged ex-CNDP and other former rebels that went through "accelerated integration." Soldiers of the 231st Brigade, which consisted mostly of ex-CNDP fighters, were found to be mostly Rwandan citizens. The strength of the FARDC in North Kivu increased to roughly 25,000.

Known FARDC structure in North Kivu, mid to late 2009
HQ	Zone	Sector	Unit
Kimia II North Kivu (Goma)	Operational Zone 1 (Grand Nord)	Sector 11 (Lubero)	111th Brigade
Kimia II North Kivu (Goma)	Operational Zone 1 (Grand Nord)	Sector 11 (Lubero)	112th Brigade (Kasugho)
Kimia II North Kivu (Goma)	Operational Zone 1 (Grand Nord)	Sector 12 (Lubero)	121st Brigade
Kimia II North Kivu (Goma)	Operational Zone 1 (Grand Nord)	Sector 12 (Lubero)	123rd Brigade
Kimia II North Kivu (Goma)	Operation Zone 2 (Petit Nord)	Sector 21	212th Brigade
Kimia II North Kivu (Goma)	Operation Zone 2 (Petit Nord)	Sector 21	213th Brigade (Ngungu)
Kimia II North Kivu (Goma)	Operation Zone 2 (Petit Nord)	Sector 22	221st Brigade
Kimia II North Kivu (Goma)	Operation Zone 2 (Petit Nord)	Sector 22	222nd Brigade
Kimia II North Kivu (Goma)	Operation Zone 2 (Petit Nord)	Sector 23	231st Brigade
Kimia II North Kivu (Goma)	Operation Zone 2 (Petit Nord)	Sector 23	232nd Brigade (Remeka)
Kimia II North Kivu (Goma)	Other known units	Sector 5	25th Brigade
Kimia II North Kivu (Goma)	Other known units	Sector 5	101st Brigade

Known FARDC structure in South Kivu, mid to late 2009
HQ	Zone	Sector	Unit
Kimia II South Kivu (Bukavu)	Operational Zone 3 (Mugugu)	Sector 31	311th Brigade
Kimia II South Kivu (Bukavu)	Operational Zone 3 (Mugugu)	Sector 31	312th Brigade
Kimia II South Kivu (Bukavu)	Operational Zone 3 (Mugugu)	Sector 31	313th Brigade
Kimia II South Kivu (Bukavu)	Operational Zone 3 (Mugugu)	Sector 32	321st Brigade
Kimia II South Kivu (Bukavu)	Operational Zone 3 (Mugugu)	Sector 32	322nd Brigade
Kimia II South Kivu (Bukavu)	Operational Zone 3 (Mugugu)	Sector 32	323rd Brigade
Kimia II South Kivu (Bukavu)	Operational Zone 3 (Mugugu)	Sector 3	331st Brigade
Kimia II South Kivu (Bukavu)	Operational Zone 3 (Mugugu)	Sector 3	332nd Brigade
Kimia II South Kivu (Bukavu)	Operation Zone 4 (Baraka)	Sector 41	411th Brigade
Kimia II South Kivu (Bukavu)	Operation Zone 4 (Baraka)	Sector 41	412th Brigade
Kimia II South Kivu (Bukavu)	Operation Zone 4 (Baraka)	Sector 42	421st Brigade
Kimia II South Kivu (Bukavu)	Operation Zone 4 (Baraka)	Sector 42	422nd Brigade
Kimia II South Kivu (Bukavu)	Operation Zone 4 (Baraka)	Sector 43	431st Brigade
Kimia II South Kivu (Bukavu)	Operation Zone 4 (Baraka)	Sector 43	432nd Brigade
Kimia II South Kivu (Bukavu)	Operation Zone 4 (Baraka)	Sector 43	433rd Brigade
Kimia II South Kivu (Bukavu)	Other known units	Sector 24	241st Brigade
Kimia II South Kivu (Bukavu)	Other known units	Sector 24	242nd Brigade
Kimia II South Kivu (Bukavu)	Other known units	Sector 51	511th Brigade
Kimia II South Kivu (Bukavu)	Other known units	Sector 51	512th Brigade

The operation expanded into South Kivu, where FDLR forces included the "Rainbow" battalion, which was deployed in the Ruzizi Plain west of Uvira along side the Burundian FNL militia; the "Gorilla" battalion in the Fizi Territory; and several Mai-Mai groups that were angered by the DRC–Rwanda agreement, one of which had 2,000 fighters.

=== Timeline ===
On 2 March 2009, the FARDC began anti-FDLR sweeping actions in North Kivu and South Kivu with the support of MONUC, officially known as Operation Kimia II ("Silence"). During the first month, the FDLR was able to retake positions that had been captured by the FARDC around Humbo, Pinga, Kibua, Kashebere and Ishasha. Civil society in the Lubero Territory on 18 March noted an increase in FDLR reprisal attacks against civilians, including in villages west of Kanyabayonga, where combat was taking place between the group and the FARDC. On 25 March, Lt. Gen. Babacar Gaye of MONUC said that there had been seven joint patrols with the FARDC, which led to the capture of 17 militants. An FDLR battalion that had been pushed into Virunga National Park returned to the Rutshuru area as of April, where they clashed with an FARDC brigade along the Ishasha-Nyamilima axis.

Attacks on civilians continued, and on the night 10–11 May, FDLR militants killed 77 people in Busurungi, Walikale Territory, using machetes, axes, and knives, or by burning them alive. In South Kivu, at least 1,128 houses had been burned down as of late May. On 12 May, the South Kivu Human Rights Network "Radhoski" called on the government to temporarily pause Kimia II until measures can be taken to better protect the civilian population, saying that the first operation only succeeded in pushing the FDLR away from the Rwandan border and deeper into the DRC. The group also noted the presence of criminals among the troops involved in Operation Kimia II. As of 15 May, at least 150 civilians had been killed as a result of recent attacks. A spokesman for MONUC said that Congolese troops and UN peacekeepers could not be everywhere, and rejected a claim by Oxfam that the joint operation has led to a "spiral of violence against civilians," saying that the FDLR attacks were a response to FARDC deployments in certain villages. The FDLR also ambushed FARDC units in isolated locations.

On 2 June 2009, the governor of North Kivu announced that 350 Congolese being held prisoner by the FDLR had been freed in the Lubero Territory. By July, the FARDC succeeded in retaining or retaking strategic FDLR territory that was gained during Operation Umoja Wetu, and removed the group from mining areas in Walikale, Lubero and Shabunda Territory. At least 624 FDLR members voluntarily disarmed during Kimia II. However, as of that month, there had been mutinies and strikes among some former CNDP units in the FARDC over their pay being delayed, and they refused to be deployed for Kimia II. The FARDC and MONUC claimed on 20 July that the operations in North Kivu had been a success, and that they will focus on South Kivu, where the group's main base had been captured, along with nine localities in the Shabunda, Kabare, and Walungu territories. As of 22 July, a total of 10,879 Rwandan citizens, including FDLR combatants and their civilian relatives, had been repatriated to Rwanda during the year, and MONUC noted an increase in July, which it attributed to Kimia II. On 29 July, Lt. Gen. Didier Etumba announced that fighting restarted in the Mwenga Territory, where the FDLR's main base in South Kivu was located, and that at least 14 combatants were killed.

The FARDC launched operations against the FDLR bases in the Bunyakiri area on the night of 12–13 August, and several bases were destroyed. The administrator of the Kalehe Territory noted an improvement in security. As of 21 August, the number of repatriated rose to 11,577. A mutiny broke out by soldiers of the FARDC's 33rd Brigade on 26 August in the Kamanyola area, where soldiers fired at a Pakistani MONUC officer. The event paralyzed traffic between Bukavu and Uvira. Payments had been delayed to members of former armed groups that integrated into the military, and the mutiny ended ended on 27 August following negotiations, and a visit from the 10th Military Region commander Masunzu. At a meeting of the tripartite mechanism on 1 September, FARDC chief of staff Etumba informed his Rwandan and Burundian counterparts about Kimia II, telling them that 1,037 FDLR militants had been killed, 1,074 were captured or had surrendered, and were repatriated. He added that at least 50 Congolese soldiers had been killed.

The FDLR began to disperse into Maniema and Katanga after its defeats in South Kivu. On 9 September, the FARDC deployed 450 men to southern Maniema to begin cutting off the roads cutting South Kivu's Fizi Territory, from where fighters had started to flee. The first attack on a Congolese military integration camp during Kimia II occurred on 6 November 2009, by a Mai-Mai group that later said that it was stealing supplies. Two of the attackers were killed, according to the military, but the group was able to get away with some boxes of supplies and ammunition. The FDLR increased its alliances with Mai-Mai and other armed groups hostile to Rwanda's government. The Tutsi Lt. Col. Emmanuel Nsengiyumva led a battalion of former CNDP fighters on a mass defection, declaring his intent to fight against the government alongside the FDLR and the Mai-Mai.

FDLR leader Ignace Murwanashyaka was arrested in Germany on 17 November, followed by other arrests in Europe, which disrupted its command structure. On 8 December, FARDC spokesman Sylvain Ekenge announced that Operation Kimia II resulted in 1,279 FDLR fighters being killed, and 1,247 repatriated, as of 4 December. The operation officially ended on 31 December 2009, after nine months, and the FARDC announced the start of another operation that it stated would consolidate that gains that were made against the FDLR and would focus more on respecting human rights.

=== Assessment ===
Operation Kimia II was not as effective as Umoj Wetu had been. The newly integrated FARDC troops had their own command structures, making coordination more difficult, and their exclusion from the military payroll lead to mutinies and desertions. According to MONUC military spokesman Lt. Col. Jean-Paul Dietrich, the FARDC would not have been able to conduct the operation without their support. Dietrich said in August 2009 that the FDLR had lost 70% of its territory, but some pockets of resistance remained. UN special envoy to the DRC Alan Doss told the Security Council that the operation's main goal of dispersing the rebels and weakening their ability to exploit the mining industry "has been largely achieved although we do recognize that there have been very serious humanitarian consequences." The UN concluded that the operation failed to dismantle the FDLR's command structures in the DRC. Kimia II ended following heavy criticism for causing mass suffering for the civilian population in the eastern DRC.

Civil society in South Kivu published an open letter to President Joseph Kabila on 13 October, stating that security in the province was becoming worse, that the disarmament and integration of armed groups was failing, and that Kimia II had unclear objectives. They called on the government to increase the Congolese National Police presence and to better implement the zero tolerance policy for violent crimes committed by the FARDC. On 15 October the provincial assembly sent a delegation of deputies to Kinshasa. That month, a coalition of 14 international NGOs published a statement that criticized the impact of Kimia II on the civilian population, and called on the UN peacekeepers to do more to protect civilians. MONUC responded by saying that over fifty mobile operating bases have been put in place for this purpose, and that the organization is supporting military justice in the FARDC to address crimes committed by soldiers.

== Operation Amani Leo ==
=== Order of battle ===
The FARDC initially used the same organization and units for Amani Leo as for Kimia II, and it was also commanded by Maj. Gen. Amuli Bahigwa. The operational commanders in North and South Kivu were Col. Bobo Kakudji and Col. Claude Mucyo, respectively. Joint planning for the operation was done the FARDC and MONUC chiefs, Lt. Gen. Etumba and Lt. Gen. Gaye. There were 60,000 Congolese government troops deployed in the Kivus by the summer of 2010, and MONUC had 9,000 soldiers deployed in ten infantry battalions, in addition to various support personnel. Another reorganization of the FARDC formations in the Kivus began in April 2011, with all brigades in the region being reorganized into 13 regiments in each province (101st–113th in the North, and 801st–813th in the South).

John Bosco Ntaganda, an ICC-indicted former warlord who had been the military coordinator for the ex-CNDP troops, later became the Amani Leo operational commander. He was replaced in that role at some point by Col. Delphin Kahimbi. Babacar Gaye was replaced as the UN commander by Lt. Gen. Chander Prakash.

=== Timeline ===
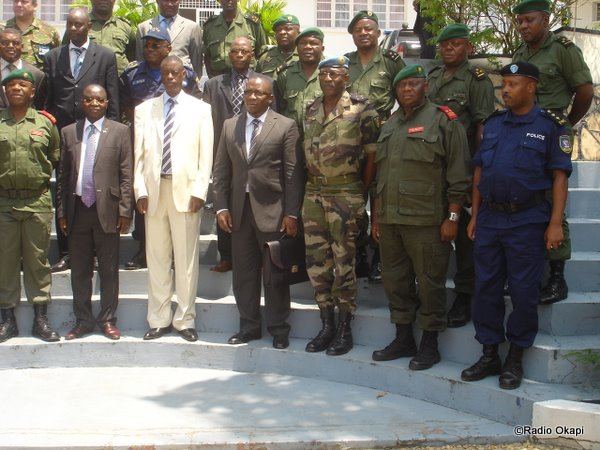
Gen. Kabarabe with Rwandan and Congolese officers during a meeting in January 2010, at Matadi, Bas-Congo, DRC.

On 1 January 2010, Operation Amani Leo ("Peace Today") was announced at the same time as the suspension of Kimia II. The FARDC stated that the protection of civilians from FDLR attacks was the main goal of the new operation, and that rapid response units would be created to hunt the remaining small and mobile groups of the FDLR. During January the military and the UN mission repositioned their troops. On 16 January, the FDLR reoccupied villages in the Nindja Chiefdom of the Kabare Territory following the withdrawal of FARDC troops. A tripartite mechanism meeting was held in Matadi, Bas-Congo, in mid-January, where the FARDC and RDF chiefs of staff Etumba and Kabarabe, along with Burundi National Defence Force chief of staff Godefroid Niyombare and MONUC commander Gaye, held a meeting to evaluate the results of Kimia II and preparations for Amani Leo.

The first FARDC–MONUC joint action of the operation took place in February. An FDLR attack in the Rutshuru area reportedly killed seven women on 7 February. As of 7 March 2010, the FARDC–MONUC coalition claimed to have killed 271 FDLR fighters and repatriated 135 since the start of Amani Leo. A spokesman for MONUC asserted on 25 March that the ongoing operation improved the security situation and secured major population centers from the FDLR. In late April 2010, FARDC positions in the Rutshuru, Lubero, and Walikale territories were attacked by Mai-Mai groups affiliated with the Allied Democratic Forces (ADF), and later the FDLR, resulting in over a week of fighting in those areas. On 5 May, the FARDC announced the situation was relatively calm. A group of 497 Mai-Mai fighters waiting to be integrated into the FARDC rebelled on 31 May and returned to their previous position.

As of June 2010, most of the actions taken during the operation had been done unilaterally by the Congolese military, without UN involvement, due to the new conditions required for UN support. The FARDC launched a "cleaning operation" in North Kivu's Walikale Territory on 1 June, in the Kimua area. On 11 June, Kabila extended Operation Amani Leo. The FDLR reportedly began reconstituting itself in North Kivu's Walikale Territory. A military spokesman said the FARDC battalions had been targeting strategic locations of the FDLR, supported by MONUC stabilization units that entered the areas afterward. As of 17 June, the "cleaning operation" in Walikale resulted in 71 dead, 2 captured and 16 surrenders from the FDLR; 7 dead from pro-FDLR Mai-Mai; and 7 soldiers killed and 10 wounded from the FARDC. In late July and early August 2010, the FDLR and allied Mai-Mai militias attacked multiple villages in the Shabunda Territory, and in the Luvungi area of the Walikale Territory. They carried out a campaign of sexual violence against hundreds of villagers.

On 27 September 2010, MONUC repatriated Lt. Col. Eli Mutarambirwa, the commander of the FDLR "Someka" battalion, when he surrendered after learning that his direct superior, Col. Pacifique Ntawunguka, planned to assassinate him. In October 2010, MONUC estimated that the FDLR's strength had been reduced to between 3,000 to 4,000 fighters since the start of military operations in 2009. There were also increased defections of former CNDP fighters to the FDLR. On 21 December 2010, the FARDC rescued three civilian hostages being held by FDLR-affiliated militants, led by Maj. Patient Akilimali, a former CNDP officer who integrated with the military in 2009 before deserting.

In February 2011 Rwanda deployed special forces into eastern Congo, numbering about 350 men. In April, Congolese troops withdrew from the front line to be reorganized into regiments, which allowed the FDLR, PARECO, APCLS (Alliance of Patriots for a Free and Sovereign Congo) and Mai-Mai Cheka militias to retake the positions that they previously occupied. After the withdrawal the FDLR increased its attacks on Kanyabayonga in the Lubero Territory, taking advantage of the absence of Congolese troops. The national police was unable to fill the security vacuum created by the withdrawal. The FDLR occupied multiple villages in the Shabunda Territory during May. That month, the UN brigade in South Kivu unilaterally launched four operations within its mandate to protect civilians, after requests for help after the FARDC withdrew.

The reorganization was completed in November, when regiments were deployed to provide security for voting during the 2011 general election. FARDC troops captured two rebel officers, Victor Amani of the FDLR and Désiré Munana of the Congolese FPLC militia, on 18 November, and killed Col. Evariste Kanzeguhera (nicknamed "Sadiki"), the commander the FDLR's "Montana" battalion, on 19 November. After the completion of the FARDC's reorganization, UN forces did 15 joint operations with Congolese troops during November and December 2011, and January 2012. On 11 January, "brigadier general" Leodomir Mugaragu, the FDLR's chief of staff, was killed. In late January, another FDLR officer was killed during an ambush on a company of the FARDC's 804th Regiment, bringing the total of senior FDLR commanders killed since July 2011 to five. A Mai-Mai militia opposed to the FDLR killed 31 members of the group, civilian relatives of the fighters, along with two Congolese civilians, on 7 March 2012. The FARDC called on the militia to disarm and surrender to the government.

On 1 April 2012, the FDLR and APCLS militias took control of Pinga in North Kivu after the FARDC's 111th Regiment abandoned its positions, as part of the mutiny of ex-CNDP troops.

=== Assessment ===
The International Crisis Group wrote in November 2010 that "the core of radical fighters linked to the Rwandan genocide and FDLR's chain of command in the field was not broken up. The military approach favoured by Kinshasa did not inflict a strategic setback for the FDLR nor did it directly neutralise their main commanders." In October 2012, it noted that Amani Leo "failed to have the intended impact on the armed groups, which have increased in number, regained territory and continue in their oppression of the civilian population." By late 2010, the FARDC had shown itself incapable of holding territory that the FDLR was expelled from, in part because of frequent troop movements, and Amani Leo became a series of attacks without a strategy. Rwanda's deployment of special forces into eastern Congo showed the ineffectiveness of the operation, and was an embarrassment for the Congolese government. The withdrawal of the FARDC from the front in April 2011 created a security vacuum filled by more armed groups.

== Operations Ruwenzori and Radi Strike ==
The Allied Democratic Forces (ADF), a Ugandan Islamist militia created in 1995 in the Ruwenzori Mountains, along the border with Uganda, was initially supported by Mobutu Sese Seko's regime and Hassan al-Turabi's Sudan against Ugandan President Yoweri Museveni. It was a merger of Ugandan Islamists and the National Army for the Liberation of Uganda (NALU), which had its origins in the Rwenzururu movement for independence from Uganda. However, over time the ADF-NALU became embedded in the local community in the remote mountainous region of eastern Congo, taking advantage of cross-border trade and the corruption of Congolese security forces. In 2007 the NALU name was dropped and it became the ADF, though the only name was still sometimes used by the media. The group was estimated to have 600 to 1,300 fighters, and recruited extremist Muslims.

The 25 April 2010 attack on Niyaleke military camp near Beni, North Kivu, by the ADF and Mai-Mai caused the FARDC to take action against them in the Beni and Lubero territories. On 25 June the FARDC launched Operation Ruwenzori against the ADF, with the support of MONUC. By late July 2010, Operation Ruwenzori resulted in the FARDC overrunning ADF positions, killing "several dozen" of its fighters (including some commanders), and causing the rest of the group to flee. However, the ADF launched reprisal attacks on civilians. War crimes were committed by both sides during the fighting, and the ADF distributed pamphlets denouncing atrocities by the FARDC. Although government troops received support from the UN mission and the Ugandan military, the ADF survived and went on the offensive. In March 2011, the group began three coordinated offensives against the FARDC in the Banande-Kainama groupement, retaking territory and killing at least three soldiers.

In July 2011, civil society in North Kivu reported that the Bolema groupement in the Ruwenzori area was the most affected by ADF attacks. On 8 March 2012, the FARDC and MONUSCO (formerly MONUC) announced Operation Radi Strike. During the short duration of the operation, the ADF took the initiative.

== Aftermath ==
Joseph Kabila, having won re-election in 2011 amidst allegations of fraud, was under pressure to arrest Bosco Ntaganda by the US and Belgium. Ntaganda was tipped off, and his soldiers began deserting from the FARDC on 1 April 2012. On 11 April, Kabila announced his intention to arrest Ntaganda, try him, and to redeploy the regiments of ex-CNDP to other parts of the country. He declared the end of combat operations in the eastern Congo (including Amani Leo and Radi Strike) to reform the army. On 6 May 2012, the rebels announced the creation of the March 23 Movement, in reference to the 23 March 2009 agreement, which they accused the government of violating.

Researchers Jason Stearns, Judith Verweijen, and Maria Eriksson Baaz wrote that the operations weakened the FDLR, but were "extremely detrimental to civilians, displacing over a million people and causing widespread insecurity." They also wrote that the integration of the CNDP into the Congolese army provoked resentment that led to the rise of other armed groups in the Kivus. The International Crisis Group wrote that the FDLR withdrew deeper into Congo in response to the operations. It also noted that the operations "allowed the army to take control of certain trade networks connecting the DRC and Uganda, but did not manage to finish off the ADF completely."

== Casualties ==
According to Gen. John Numbi, as of late February 2009, Operation Umoja Wetu resulted in the deaths of 153 FDLR fighters, 13 injured, 37 captured, 103 deserted, and 1,300 repatriated to Rwanda, along with 5,000 civilians. He stated that FDLR killed 32 civilians and burned down six villages. Lt. Gen. Dider Etumba said in September 2009 that 1,037 fighters had been killed during Operation Kimia II up to that point. On 8 December 2009, FARDC spokesman Maj. Sylvain Ekenge announced that 1,279 FDLR fighters had been killed and 1,247 repatriated, as of 4 December. Ekenge claimed on 11 June 2010 that 1,049 FDLR fighters had been killed over the previous six months of Operation Amani Leo.

Etumba said in September 2009 that over 50 Congolese soldiers had been killed. As of January 2010, Ekenge said that the military recorded at least 211 soldiers killed, 200 wounded, and 50 missing during Kimia II. Three UN peacekeepers were killed by rebels on 18 August 2010.

The fighting in early 2009 displaced 35,000 people in the Kivus, in addition to the 1.3 million that were already displaced before the start of Operation Umoja Wetu. Human Rights Watch reported in December 2009 that there were over 900,000 new internally displaced people because of the offensives. The campaign against the ADF displaced 60,000 as of August 2010.

== War crimes ==
Both FDLR militants and FARDC soldiers committed war crimes during the offensives, including looting, rape, and murder. Human Rights Watch reported in December 2009 that a total of 1,400 civilians were deliberately killed between January and September, including some by the Congolese army. Over 15,000 cases of sexual violence were reported in 2009, and over 7,600 were reported in the first six months of 2010. The UN primarily attributed these cases to the FDLR and the FARDC. After Rwandan troops left the country at the conclusion of Operation Umoja Wetu, the FDLR went on a campaign of reprisals against civilians that it accused of disloyalty; killing, raping, and burning down houses. The ADF also launched reprisal attacks after the start of Operation Ruwenzori. Some of the violence and criminality was committed by the Congolese army. Although MONUC made support for the FARDC conditional on improvements in human rights, that was primarily done as a legal defense for the UN mission. Both the FDLR and the FARDC recruited child soldiers.

The integration of the CNDP and other militias was done with the promise of an amnesty by the parliament of the DRC, which passed a law on 7 May 2009 that granted amnesty for "acts of war" between 2003 and 2009, though the war crimes of certain commanders were excluded only for legal reasons. The Congolese government saw a formal or informal amnesty as the price of integration. UN special envoy Alan Doss told the Security Council that since the CNDP was integrated into the Congolese military, "the problem of discipline in the FARDC has worsened." In response to atrocities committed by the FARDC during Operation Kimia II, Kabila announced later in 2009 a "zero tolerance" policy for sexual violence committed by security forces, which led to more prosecutions and a notable decrease in rape cases involving soldiers.

== Bibliography ==
Articles and reports

- International Crisis Group (2007). "Congo: Bringing Peace to North Kivu". Crisis Group Africa Report (133). JSTOR resrep38336.5.
- International Crisis Group (2009). "Congo: A Comprehensive Strategy to Disarm the FDLR". Crisis Group Africa Report (151). JSTOR resrep38372.
- International Crisis Group (2010). "Congo: No Stability in Kivu Despite a Rapprochement with Rwanda". Crisis Group Africa Report (165). JSTOR resrep37001.
- International Crisis Group (2012a). "Eastern Congo: Why Stabilisation Failed". Crisis Group Africa Briefing (91). JSTOR resrep32305.
- International Crisis Group (2012b). "Eastern Congo: The ADF-NALU's Lost Rebellion". Crisis Group Africa Briefing (93). JSTOR resrep32308.
- Robinson, Colin (2012). "Army reconstruction in the Democratic Republic of the Congo 2003–2009". Small Wars & Insurgencies. 23 (3): 474–499. doi:10.1080/09592318.2012.661612. S2CID 145375095.

Books

- Clément, Caty (2009). "Security Sector Reform in the DRC: Forward to the Past". In Born, Hans; Schnabel, Albert (eds.). Security Security Reform in Challenging Environments. Berlin: LIT Verlag. ISBN 978-3-643-80013-8.
- Prunier, Gérard (2009). From Genocide to Continental War: The 'Congolese' Conflict and the Crisis of Contemporary Africa. London: Hurst Publishers. ISBN 978-1-85065-523-7.
- Stearns, Jason; Verweijen, Judith; Eriksson Baaz, Maria (2013). The National Army and Armed Groups in the Eastern Congo: Untangling the Gordian Knot of Insecurity. London: Rift Valley Institute. ISBN 978-1-907431-30-2.
