= Rasta =

Rasta may refer to:

- Rastafari, a person who practices the movement and religion
- Rasta militia, warlords from the Second Congo War
- Rasta (Mandaeism) a white religious garment of the Mandaean religion
- Lester "Rasta" Speight, American football player, wrestler, and actor
- Rasta (singer) (born 1989 as Stefan Đurić), Serbian recording artist and producer
- Rasta Vechta, German basketball team
- Stig Rästa (born 1980), Estonian musician
- Rasta filtering, filter used in signal processing

== See also ==
- Raasta (disambiguation)
- Raster (disambiguation)
