= Army for the Liberation of Rwanda =

Rebel group of the Second Congo War

- Ingabo zo Kubohoza u Rwanda (Kinyarwanda); Armée pour la Libération du Rwanda (French)
- Leader: Paul Rwarakabije
- Dates active: 1997 – 30 September 2000
- Active regions: DRC–Rwandan border
- Ideology: Hutu Power
- Political position: Far-right
- Size: 12,000–22,000 in the DRC

The Army for the Liberation of Rwanda (French: Armée pour la Libération du Rwanda, ALiR; Kinyarwanda: Ingabo zo Kubohoza u Rwanda, IzKR) was a rebel group largely composed of former members of the Interahamwe and Rwandan Armed Forces. Operating mostly in the eastern regions of the Democratic Republic of the Congo along the border with Rwanda, it carried out attacks throughout the Second Congo War against forces aligned with Rwanda and Uganda. In 2000, the ALiR agreed to merge with the Hutu resistance movement based in Kinshasa into the new Democratic Forces for the Liberation of Rwanda (FDLR). ALiR was largely supplanted by the FDLR by 2001.

== History ==
The Rwandan genocide in 1994 was largely carried out by the national army, the Rwandan Armed Forces (FAR) and the paramilitary Interahamwe. Following the invasion of Rwanda by the Rwandan Patriotic Front (RPF) led by Paul Kagame, many FAR and Interahamwe members fled across the border into Zaire. During the resulting Great Lakes refugee crisis, these two groups merged and formed into the Army for the Liberation of Rwanda (ALIR). The increased intensity of cross-border attacks by the ALIR led the Rwandan government to secretly arm the ethnically Tutsi Banyamulenge and organize the creation of a proxy rebel group, the Alliance of Democratic Forces for the Liberation of Congo (AFDL), led by Laurent-Désiré Kabila. The AFDL invaded Zaire in late 1996 in what became known as the First Congo War. The AFDL and their Rwandan and Ugandan allies forced the Hutu refugees back into Rwanda and scattering the ALiR fighters to countries such as Zambia, Angola, Congo-Brazzaville, the Central African Republic, Chad, Sudan, Burundi and Tanzania. The AFDL continued on to Kinshasa, overthrowing Mobutu Sese Seko and installing Kabila as president on 17 May 1997. Kabila then announced that the name of the country was being changed from Zaire to the Democratic Republic of the Congo.

While Kabila was completing his rebellion, the ALIR remnants reformed and recruited new Hutu fighters from eastern Zaire. ALIR became active again in eastern Zaire by early 1997. The ALiR's political wing, the Party for the Liberation of Rwanda (PALIR), maintained the old goal of overthrowing the Kagame government and regaining power, to which it added the objective of expelling the foreign invaders, thereby giving it more appeal to local populations. There were also concerns that it intended to continue the genocide against the Tutsis. Even before regaining a military presence, a letter allegedly sent by the ALiR threatened to kill the American ambassador to Rwanda and other U.S. citizens in retaliation for support to Rwanda.

By July 1998, the alliance between Kabila and his Rwandan and Ugandan sponsors had broken down. Kabila ordered the foreign forces out of the country, prompting Rwanda and Uganda to create another rebel group, the Rally for Congolese Democracy (RCD), to overthrow Kabila in the Second Congo War. Kabila then began to provide military support to ALiR, many members of which he had tried to kill less than two years previously, in order to weaken the RCD and foreign military forces in eastern Congo.

As the war grew into the most deadly conflict since the Second World War, several thousand ALiR fighters carried out guerrilla attacks behind the front lines. In 1999, eight tourists from the U.S., United Kingdom and New Zealand and a Ugandan game warden were killed while in Uganda's Bwindi National Park, along the border with the DRC. The tourists were tracking rare mountain gorillas and were apparently targeted as English language speakers. One captured French diplomat was released with a message condemning the U.S. and UK for their support of the RPF-led regime in Rwanda. The violent attack largely destroyed Uganda's tourist industry for years.

For the next several years, the battle lines stabilized and the war stagnated as Uganda and Rwanda competed to extract resources from the rich mines and forests of eastern Congo that they occupied. The ALiR continued to carry out attacks upon both opposing armed groups, as well as civilian populations that they thought supported their enemies. Following Kabila's assassination on 18 January 2001 and the rise of his son Joseph, the ALiR consolidated forces with a Kinshasa-based Hutu group to form the Democratic Forces for the Liberation of Rwanda (FDLR). While never officially disbanded, ALiR lost its separate identity under the FDLR. Despite official declarations from the FDLR that they have given up armed resistance, ALiR remnants continued to fight in eastern Congo.
