= Alaa Mousa =

Syrian war criminal

Alaa Mousa, commonly referred to as Alaa M. in German legal documents due to privacy laws, is a Syrian doctor who was convicted by the Frankfurt Higher Regional Court for crimes against humanity.

== Biography and career ==
Alaa Mousa was born in 1984 or 1985 in Syria. He graduated from medical studies in Syria and began working as a civilian doctor. As with all Syrian medical graduates, he was obligated to complete an internship at either civilian or military hospitals in order to receive his specialization certificate. He worked in military hospitals in Homs and Damascus, including Hospital 608 in Homs and Hospital 601 in Damascus, where he worked from 2011 to 2012.

=== Alleged crimes in Syria ===
While working at the military hospitals, starting soon after the early days of the Syrian civil war, Mousa allegedly committed torture and murder along with crimes against humanity. He was accused of having tortured people on at least 18 occasions. These included a teenager whose genitals he set fire to, a detainee to whom he gave a lethal injection after resisting beating, another prisoner whose wounds he set fire to and an epileptic man who he beat and later provided with an (unspecified) pill that lead to his death. He also performed surgery on prisoners without giving them the right amount of anesthesia and attempted to "deprive opposition detainees of their ability to reproduce". He was also involved in systematic abuse, including physical and psychological torture, that often resulting in death of detainees.

=== Move to Germany ===
In 2015 Mousa relocated to Germany. He entered the country with a visa for highly skilled workers along with thousands of Syrian refugees and medical professionals who ran away from the conflict. He then worked in Germany as an orthopedic doctor. In June 2020 he was arrested by German authorities following an Al-Jazeera documentary released in April and a Der Spiegel article published in May. This documentary and article were the first times Mousa was accused, having been recognized by witnesses and survivors who reported his past crimes.

=== Trial ===
His trial began in late January 2022, at the Higher Regional Court in Frankfurt. This case was conducted under Germany’s universal jurisdiction laws, allowing prosecution for crimes committed abroad. The trial, which lasted three years, was the first time a trial on state torture in Syria had taken place worldwide. Mousa admitted to being present while prisoners were tortured but claimed he was powerless to help them. He accused the prosecution witnesses of forming a "conspiracy" against him because he was a Christian.

On June 16, 2025 Mousa was found guilty of crimes against humanity, torture, war crimes, and two murders. During sentencing, Judge Christoph Koller described him as a sadist who "enjoyed harming people that he considered inferior and of lower value to himself". Mousa was sentenced to life imprisonment with preventive detention after 15 years.

== See also ==
- Völkerstrafgesetzbuch
- Universal jurisdiction
