= Raasta =

Raasta (lit. '"way", "path"') may refer to:

== Film ==
- Raasta (1989 film), 1989 Indian Hindi-language film
- Raasta (2003 film), 2003 Indian Bengali-language film
- Raasta (2014 film), 2014 Indian Odia-language film, winner of 6th Tarang Cine Awards
- Raasta (2017 film), Pakistani action-drama film directed by Saqib Siddiqui

== See also ==
- Rasta (disambiguation)
- Raasta Man (2011), sixth studio album by Lucky Ali
- Raasta roko (lit. 'obstruct the road') form of protest commonly practised in India
- Naya Raasta (lit. 'New Road') 1970 Indian Hindi-language drama film
