= Callixte Mbarushimana =

Rwandan accused of genocide (1963–2026)

- Born: 24 July 1963; Ndusu, Ruhengeri, Rwanda
- Died: 4 October 2026 (aged 63)
- Known for: Indicted by the ICC for war crimes and crimes against humanity

Callixte Mbarushimana (24 July 1963 – 4 October 2026) was a Hutu Rwandan and United Nations employee (1992–2001) who is alleged to have participated in the Rwandan genocide of 1994. On 28 September 2010, Mbarushimana was indicted by the International Criminal Court (ICC) in The Hague for crimes against humanity and war crimes allegedly committed in the Democratic Republic of the Congo in 2009. He was arrested in France in October 2010 and extradited to the ICC on 25 January 2011. However, he was released on 23 December 2011 as the ICC found there was insufficient evidence for prosecuting him.

== Alleged participation in the Rwandan Genocide ==
Mbarushimana is alleged to have directed and participated in the murder of 32 people in 1994, including U.N. employees he was given the responsibility to protect. He was dismissed from the U.N. in 2001 but in 2004 he won a lawsuit seeking compensation for his dismissal.

He joined the UN in 1992 and remained a staff member until 2001 serving in Angola and Kosovo. At the time of the Genocide, Mbarushimana was left in charge of providing supplies and support to the UN national staff who had been left behind following the UN's evacuation of international civilian staff. A strange designation as the years prior to the Genocide, Callixte Mbarushimana is known to have participated in anti-Tutsi rallies. Additionally, evidence collected by the ICTR team preparing the draft indictment against him indicated that before the war he trained a personal militia. Mbarushimana is alleged not only to have handed over UN vehicles and supplies to Rwandan militias (e.g. the Interahamwe) or the military, but he is also accused of being directly involved in killing and ordering the killing of people during the genocide. Amongst the U.N. employees Mbarushimana is alleged to have murdered was Florence Ngirumpatse, the director of personnel at the U.N. development office in Kigali.

When war crimes investigator Tony Grieg researched the Mbarushimana case, he interviewed at least 20 people who witnessed the murders and confirmed that Mbarushimana was directly involved. However, Mbarushimana was never indicted for these crimes, possibly because he was not considered to be one of the main organisers of the killings.

== Indicted by the International Criminal Court ==
On 11 October 2010, Mbarushimana was arrested in France under a sealed warrant from the International Criminal Court for crimes against humanity and war crimes allegedly committed in the Kivus (Democratic Republic of the Congo). The warrant concerns widespread attacks allegedly committed by troops of the Democratic Forces for the Liberation of Rwanda (FDLR), against civilians in North and South Kivu in 2009. The Court's judges state that there are reasonable grounds to believe that Mbarushimana, as Executive Secretary of the FDLR, bears criminal responsibility for these attacks, including murder, torture, rape, persecution and inhumane acts. The warrant alleges that Mbarushimana was part of a plan to create a humanitarian catastrophe to extract concessions of political power for the FDLR.

On 25 January 2011, Mbarushimana was extradited to the International Criminal Court for prosecution at The Hague. Prosecutor Luis Moreno-Ocampo issued a statement in which he recalled that Mbarushimana's FDLR triggered the Congo wars and that girls and women have borne the brunt of ruthless sexual violence for almost a generation. He stated that, due to the ICC, "rape can no longer be used as a weapon of war".

=== Released ===
On 16 December 2011 the First Preliminary Chamber of the ICC, by a two-to-one majority, dismissed the charges against Mbarushimana, on the grounds that there was insufficient evidence for assuming that he has contributed to the war crimes in North and South Kivu. The Prosecutor's appeal against an immediate release was rejected on 23 December, and Mbarushimana was released the same day. On 30 May 2012 the ICC's Appeal Chamber also dismissed the Prosecutor's appeal against the decision not to prosecute him.

== Flight to France ==
On 7 April 2024, Rwandan President Paul Kagame accused Mbarushimana of having "delivered to the killers" Paul Kagame's cousin. Kagame said: "He then continued his career at the United Nations for many years, even after evidence implicating him emerged." "He is still a free man, now living in France". On 1 October 2024, the French justice system dropped the charges against Mbarushimana, who was prosecuted for crimes against humanity during the genocide of the Tutsi in Rwanda in 1994.

== Death ==
Mbarushimana died in France on 4 October 2026, at the age of 63.
