= Raster (disambiguation) =

Raster may refer to:

- Raster graphics, graphical techniques using arrays of pixel values
- Raster graphics editor, a computer program
- Raster scan, the pattern of image readout, transmission, storage, and reconstruction in television and computer images
- Rasterisation, or rasterization, conversion of a vector image to a raster image
- Raster image processor, or RIP, a component of a printing system that performs rasterisation
- Raster interrupt, a computer interrupt signal
- Raster to vector, an image conversion process
- Raster bar, an effect used in computer demos
- Raster-Noton, a record label
- Rastrum, a device used in medieval music manuscripts to draw staff lines
- Raster Document Object, a file format

== People ==
- Hermann Raster (1827–1891), German Forty-Eighter

== See also ==
- Rasta (disambiguation)
