= Kibua =

Coordinates: 1.233965°S 28.416252°E

Kibua is a village in Walikale Territory, North Kivu, Democratic Republic of the Congo.

== History ==
Due to government reorganization in the 1960s, it became home to a core group of people from the Banabenge clan. In 2009, Kibua was "one of the main military bases" of the Democratic Forces for the Liberation of Rwanda (FDLR), according to Human Rights Watch. On 13 February 2009 the town was captured by the Rwandan army during the Operation Umoja Wetu. By 2010, MONUSCO had a team based in Kibua.
