= Democratic Forces for the Liberation of Rwanda =

Rebel group in the DR Congo

- Ingabo za demokarasi zo kubohoza u Rwanda (Kinyarwanda); Forces démocratiques de libération du Rwanda (French)
- Flag of the FDLR
- Leaders: Ignace Murwanashyaka (POW); Callixte Mbarushimana; Sylvestre Mudacumura †; Gaston Iyamuremye (interim president); Pacifique Ntawungukav (overall commander of military wing)
- Dates active: 30 September 2000 – present
- Headquarters: North Kivu: Kibua (until January 2009); Buleusa (2009–November 2015); Camp Paris, Virunga National Park (2016–2022); Camp Mozambique, Kishishe (2022–2023); Kinyana, Masisi (2023–); South Kivu: Kalonge
- Active regions: Eastern Democratic Republic of the Congo
- Ideology: Hutu Power
- Political position: Far-right
- Size: 6,000–7,000 (October 2007); 5,000 (October 2015); 1,000 to 1,500 (2024)

The Democratic Forces for the Liberation of Rwanda (French: Forces démocratiques de libération du Rwanda, FDLR; Kinyarwanda: Ingabo za demokarasi zo kubohoza u Rwanda, IDKR) is an armed rebel group active in the eastern Democratic Republic of the Congo. As an ethnic Hutu group opposed to the ethnic Tutsi influence, the FDLR is one of the last factions of Rwandan rebels active in the Congo. It was founded through an amalgamation of other groups of Rwandan refugees in September 2000, including the former Army for the Liberation of Rwanda (ALiR), under the leadership of Paul Rwarakabije. It was active during the latter phases of the Second Congo War and the subsequent insurgencies in Kivu.

As of December 2009, Major General Sylvestre Mudacumura was the FDLR's overall military commander. He was the former deputy commander of the FAR Presidential Guard in Rwanda in 1994. Mudacumura was killed by DRC security in 2019. The FDLR made a partial separation between its military and civilian wings in September 2003 when a formal armed branch, the Forces Combattantes Abacunguzi (FOCA), was created.

According to the U.S. National Counterterrorism Center, the FDLR is believed to be responsible for about a dozen terrorist attacks committed in 2009. These acts of terrorism have killed hundreds of civilians in Eastern Congo.

== Dispositions at merger ==
Before ALiR merged with the FDLR in September 2000, the military configuration was as follows:

- ALiR was split into two divisions, each containing three brigades of about 2000 men (a total of 12,000 men). The first division was stationed in North Kivu and the second around the Kahuzi Biega forest (in the Shabunda, Mwenga, Kalehe territories) and in South Kivu.
- The FDLR troops consisted of one division of three brigades, plus one more incomplete brigade. After fighting for Kinshasa, troop numbers were down to little more than 7000 to 8000 men, according to the FDLR. But this figure does not take into account the probable recruitment and training of three supplementary brigades, as reported and denounced by the Rwandan government. After the ALiR/FDLR merger, for logistical reasons, an operations centre for troops present in southern Kivu remained in Kamina.

Gérard Prunier presents a different picture to the ICG's assessment. As of approximately August 2001, he describes two separate ALiR groups, the 'old' ALiR I in North Kivu, made up of ex-FAR and Interahamwe, about 4,000 strong, and the 'new' ALiR II operating in South Kivu out of DR Congo government supported bases in Kasai and northern Katanga. Prunier says of ALiR II that "it had over 10,000 men, and although many of the officers were old genocidaires most of the combatants were recruited after 1997. They were the ones that fought around Pepa, Moba, and Pweto in late 2000." "The even newer FDLR had around 3,000 men, based in Kamina in Katanga. Still untried in combat, they had been trained by the Zimbabweans and were a small, fully equipped conventional army."

It is not clear which if either of these two accounts is correct. The ALiR is currently listed on the U.S. Department of State's Terrorist Exclusion List as a terrorist organization.

== Timeline ==
The FDLR counts among its number the original members of the Interahamwe that led the 1994 Rwandan genocide. It received extensive backing from, and cooperation from, the government of Congolese President Laurent-Désiré Kabila, who used the FDLR as a proxy force against the foreign Rwandan armies operating in the country, in particular the Rwandan Patriotic Army (RPF military wing) and Rwanda-backed Rally for Congolese Democracy. In July 2002, FDLR units still in Kinshasa-held territory moved into North and South Kivu. At this time it was thought to have between 15,000 and 20,000 members. Even after the official end of the Second Congo War in 2002, FDLR units continued to attack Tutsi forces both in eastern DRC and across the border into Rwanda, vastly increasing tensions in the region and raising the possibility of another Rwandan offensive into the DRC – what would be their third since 1996. In mid-2004, a number of attacks forced 25,000 Congolese to flee their homes.

Following several days of talks with Congolese government representatives, the FDLR announced on 31 March 2005 that they were abandoning their armed struggle and returning to Rwanda as a political party. The talks held in Rome, Italy were mediated by Sant'Egidio. The Rwandan government stated that any returning genocidaires would face justice, most probably through the gacaca court system. It was stated that if all of the FDLR commanders, who are believed to control about 10,000 militants, disarmed and returned, a key source of cross-border tensions would be removed.

On October 4, 2005, the United Nations Security Council issued a statement demanding the FDLR disarm and leave the Democratic Republic of the Congo immediately. Under an agreement reached in August, the rebels had pledged to leave Congo by September 30.

In August 2007, the Congolese military announced that it was ending a seven-month offensive against the FDLR, prompting a sharp rebuke by the government of Rwanda. Prior to this, Gen. Laurent Nkunda had split from the government, taking Banyamulenge (ethnic Tutsis in the DRC) soldiers from the former Rally for Congolese Democracy and assaulting FDLR positions, displacing a further 160,000 people.

In October 2007 the International Crisis Group said that the group's military forces had dropped from an estimated 15,000 in 2001 to 6–7,000 then, organised into four battalions and a reserve brigade in North Kivu and four battalions in South Kivu. It named the political and military headquarters as Kibua and Kalonge respectively, both in the jungle covered Walikale region of North Kivu. It also said that 'about the same number' of Rwandan citizens, family members of combatants, and unrelated refugees remained behind FDLR lines in separate communities.

In December 2008 DR Congo and Rwanda agreed to attempt to disband the FDLR, though they will have to destroy the organisation by force or otherwise shut it down. On January 20, 2009, the Rwandan Army, in concert with the Congolese government, entered the DR Congo to hunt down lingering FDLR fighters.

=== Later developments ===
On 9 and 10 May 2009, FDLR rebels were blamed for attacks on the villages of Ekingi (South Kivu) and Busurungi (Walikale territory, southern boundary of North Kivu). More than 90 people were killed at Ekingi, including 60 civilians and 30 government troops, and "dozens more" were said to be killed at Busurungi. The FDLR were blamed by the United Nations' Office for the Coordination of Humanitarian Affairs. The UN Group of Experts' report, S/2009/603, issued 9 November 2009, said "Consistent statements collected by the Group from FDLR elements who participated in this attack confirmed that it was conducted in retaliation against the FARDC for the killings in late April 2009 at Shalio."

The Group further commented that "The attack at Busurungi on 10 May 2009 was conducted in clear violation of international human rights law and international humanitarian law. The systematic nature of attacks by the FDLR against the civilian population at Busurungi suggests that they could qualify as crimes against humanity. The attack on Busurungi was perpetrated by the elements of the FDLR battalion "Zodiac" under the command of Lt Col Nzegiyumva of the FDLR Reserve Brigade, in turn under the command of Col Kalume. Reportedly, the attacks were also perpetrated by the Special Company under the command of Capt Mugisha Vainquer. Some information received by the Group indicated that the operation was supported by an FDLR commando unit."

The FDLR had attacked several other villages in the preceding weeks and clashes occurred between FDLR forces and the Congolese Army, during which government forces are reported to have lost men killed and wounded. The most recent attacks have forced a significant number of people from their homes in Busurungi to Hombo, 20 kilometres (12 mi) north. The Congolese Army and MONUC have conducted Operation Kimia II in North and South Kivu to try to eliminate the FDLR, which has not been very successful.

The FDLR website was hosted in Germany, but after the request of the German newspaper Die Tageszeitung, it was taken offline. The website is now hosted by the Italian provider Register.it.

The UN peacekeeping mission MONUC has been accused of sharing intelligence with the FDLR. However, these accusations are unreliable at best as they were made by the New Times, a media outlet under Rwanda state control. The government of Rwanda has been hostile towards MONUC and during its proxy war with the Congo, its military forces even attacked peacekeepers while part of the CNDP.

On August 24, 2010, the United Nations confirmed that rebels from the FDLR and from the Mai Mai militia raped and assaulted at least 154 civilians from July 30 to August 3, in the town of Luvungi in North Kivu province. United Nations Secretary-General Ban Ki-moon, who had made protecting civilians and combating sexual violence central themes of his presidency, was reported to be outraged by the attack. Atul Khare, deputy head of the U.N.'s peacekeeping department, was dispatched to the region, and Margot Wallström, the organisation's special representative for sexual violence in conflict, was instructed to take charge of the U.N. response and follow up. The United Nations had withdrawn 1,700 peace keepers in recent months, responding to the Congolese government's demand to end the UN peacekeeping mission (recently renamed MONUSCO). Earlier Wallström was quoted as saying that this withdrawal would make the struggle against sexual violence in the region significantly more difficult.

=== Arrests ===
FDLR chairman Ignace Murwanashyaka was arrested in Mannheim, Germany, in April 2006, but released shortly thereafter. However, in November 2009, after pressure applied by the United Nations, the German Bundeskriminalamt captured Murwanashyaka, the 46-year-old chairman of the FDLR, again, along with his 48-year-old deputy, Straton Musoni, in Karlsruhe. This was considered a severe blow to the FDLR organization.

The trial for Murwanashyaka and Musoni began on May 4, 2011, before the Oberlandesgericht in Stuttgart. They are accused of several counts of war crimes and crimes against humanity according to the German Völkerstrafgesetzbuch. Their trial is the first held in Germany for crimes against this law. In September 2015, Murwanashyaka was sentenced to 13 years, Musoni to 8 years, in prison. In December 2018, the Federal Court of Justice overturned the judgment on revision of the defendant and the Public Prosecutor General as a whole. In April 2019, Murwanashyaka died while awaiting the new trial.

In October 2010, the Executive Secretary, Callixte Mbarushimana, was arrested in France under a sealed warrant from the International Criminal Court (ICC) for crimes against humanity and war crimes allegedly committed in the Kivus (Democratic Republic of the Congo). The warrant concerns widespread attacks allegedly committed by FDLR troops against civilians in North and South Kivu in 2009. The Court's judges state that there are reasonable grounds to believe that Mbarushimana bears criminal responsibility for these attacks, including murder, torture, rape, persecution and inhumane acts. The warrant alleges that Mbarushimana was part of a plan to create a humanitarian catastrophe to extract concessions of political power for the FDLR.

On 13 July 2012, the ICC announced an arrest mandate against the FDLR chief Sylvestre Mudacumura for war crimes committed in the Kivus as well as against Bosco Ntaganda. On 7 November 2019, Trial Chamber VI of International Criminal Court (ICC) sentenced Bosco Ntaganda to a total of 30 years of imprisonment.

In April 2020, the FDLR was accused of attacking a civilian convoy in the Virunga National Park, killing a dozen park rangers, while in February 2021, it was accused of killing the Italian ambassador to DRC, Luca Attanasio, his bodyguard and his driver.

On 1 March, 2025, FDLR intelligence chief Ezechiel Gakwerere, who was previously captured in the M23 offensive, was handed over to the Rwandan government. The leader of the FDLR's military wing, Pacifique Ntawungukav, was reportedly killed in the January fighting, but this could not be confirmed.

=== Alleged support from the DRC ===
In October 2022, findings from reports by Human Rights Watch revealed that the Congolese military provided support to the FDLR in their engagement against the M23 rebel group.

== See also ==
- Rasta (Congo) – a rebel splinter group of the Democratic Forces for the Liberation of Rwanda
