= Sylvestre Mudacumura =

Rwandan rebel leader (1954–2019)

- Born: 1954; Gisenyi, Ruanda-Urundi (present-day Rwanda)
- Died: 2019 (aged 64–65)
- Military career
- Commands: FDLR
- Conflicts: Second Congo War

Sylvestre Mudacumura (1954 – 17/18 September 2019) was a Rwandan rebel leader who was the leader of the military wing of the rebel Democratic Forces for the Liberation of Rwanda (FDLR), known as the Forces Combattants Abacunguzi (FOCA).

== Education ==
He was described as being age 55 in 2009. Prior to the genocide, he attended "the leadership academy of the armed forces in Hamburg" on a two year scholarship. (This institution appears almost certainly to have been the Führungsakademie der Bundeswehr.)

== Military career ==
Mudacumura was the deputy commander of the Presidential Guard of the Rwandan Armed Forces during the 1994 genocide. Following the genocide, Mudacumura's wife and children were moved to Germany with the help of FDLR political leader Ignace Murwanashyaka.

Mudacumura was an FDLR 'westerner', belonging to the group of rebels who were previously based in Kamina and fought alongside the Forces Armées Congolaise, as opposed to the group that stayed in the Kivus. Since 2003, there has been tension within the FDLR as Mudacumura replaced 'easterners' with 'westerners' in the command structure. He was implicated in the December 2006 death of the former FOCA second in command, Colonel Jean Baptist Kanyandekwe, who died of poisoning at a party thrown by the FOCA head. Kanyandekwe is said to have led a faction advocating for the end of hostilities and the return of the rebels to Rwanda.

Human Rights Watch said in December 2009,

According to former FDLR combatants interviewed by Human Rights Watch and others, General Mudacumura has clear and immediate command responsibility over FDLR forces. "It is Mudacumura who gives all the overall instructions and commands, and others follow his orders... No operation could ever be done without his consent," one former FDLR combatant told Human Rights Watch. In another case, a senior FDLR deserter from the Reserve Brigade told UN officials that Lt. Col. Félicien Nzabanita, commander of the Reserve Brigade, which conducted several of the larger attacks on civilians during Umoja Wetu and Kimia II, "never made any decisions unless they were coming from Mudacumura."

It is unclear if Mudacumura or Murwanashyaka had more power in the FDLR, with at least one FOCA colonel stating that Murwanashyaka reported to Mudacumura during a visit. Mudacumura's younger brother, known as "Big Patrick", has a relationship with the Indian Battalion of MONUC. Big Patrick was also rumored to have used his contacts with MONUC to provide expatriate medical care to Mudacumura in November 2009. Mudacumura's brother-in-law, Lt. Col. Edmond Ngarambe, was the FOCA spokesperson prior to being captured in Operation Umoja Wetu.

== Sanctions and war crimes charges ==
Mudacumura was sanctioned by the U.S. Office of Foreign Assets Control under Executive Order 13413 and the United Nations Security Council's Consolidated Travel Ban and Assets Freeze List.

The prosecutor of the International Criminal Court (ICC) sought an arrest warrant against him, alleging responsibility for crimes against humanity and war crimes committed in 2009-10 in the Kivus. The warrant was issued on 13 July 2012. The warrant was for war crimes, but not crimes against humanity, since the ICC's Pre-Trial Chamber concluded that the Prosecutor had not fulfilled its burden of showing reasonable grounds that the FDLR's criminal activities were systematically directed at civilians.

== Death ==
Mudacumura was killed by Democratic Republic of Congo (DRC) security forces in Rutshuru Territory on the night of 17/18 September 2019, along with "his closest lieutenants".
