= Völkerstrafgesetzbuch =

German law for prosecuting international crimes against human rights

The Völkerstrafgesetzbuch (German: [ˈfœlkɐˌʃtʁaːfɡəˌzɛtsbuːx], "Code of Crimes against International Law"), abbreviated VStGB, is a German law that regulates crimes against (public) international law. It allows cases to be brought against suspects under international criminal law provisions, meaning that suspects can be prosecuted even though both they and their victims are foreigners and the crime itself took place abroad.

The VStGB was created to bring the German criminal law in accordance with the Rome Statute of the International Criminal Court. It was announced on 26 June 2002 and became law 30 June 2002.

== Contents ==
The VStGB covers the following offenses:

- Genocide (§ 6)
- Crimes against humanity (§ 7)
- War crimes (§§ 8–12)
- Wars of aggression (§ 13)

None of these are subject to a statute of limitations (§ 5). The general principles of criminal law under the Strafgesetzbuch (German penal code) remain applicable, unless otherwise provided (§ 2). As a novelty under German criminal law, provisions on superior responsibility are established (§§ 4, 13, 14). Acting upon superior orders may only exculpate a perpetrator of international crimes in exceptional circumstances (§ 3).

According to § 1, genocide, crimes against humanity, and war crimes are subject to universal jurisdiction, thus German courts can punish offenses committed by foreign citizens abroad. Prosecutorial jurisdiction lies with the Public Prosecutor General. Competent courts at first instance are the Oberlandesgerichte (Higher Regional Courts). The prosecution of crimes committed outside German jurisdiction is limited by § 153f of the German Criminal Procedural Code, which gives the Public Prosecutor General a wide discretion of when to open a case via universal jurisdiction, if the offender is not of German nationality. So far the Public Prosecutor General's office has suspended persecator measures for 128 cases brought to its attention involving international crimes pursuant to the German International Criminal Code.

== Notable cases ==
In May 2011, the trial of two Rwandan citizens, Ignace Murwanashyaka and Straton Musoni, began before the Higher Regional Court in Stuttgart. This was the first trial under the VStGB in Germany. Prosecutors had pushed for a life sentence for Murwanashyaka with no conditional release after 15 years and 12 years in prison for Musoni. In September 2015, the accused were eventually sentenced to 13 and 8 years in prison.

In May 2021, ten Belarusians asked the Public Prosecutor General to open a criminal investigation against President Alexander Lukashenko and security officers for alleged crimes against humanity during a crackdown on protests.

=== Syrian civil war, 2017–present ===
In 2017, the Higher Regional Court in Stuttgart found a 24-year-old Syrian national guilty under the VStGB of being an accessory to a war crime against the United Nations Disengagement Observer Force (UNDOF) that involved kidnapping of Canadian peacekeeper Carl Campeau for ransom, three counts of attempted robbery by blackmail and grievous unlawful detention during the Syrian civil war

In April 2020, proceedings were launched at the Higher Regional Court in Koblenz against Anwar Raslan and Eyad al-Gharib, two suspected members of President Bashar al-Assad's security services, on charges of crimes against humanity, rape, aggravated sexual assault and murder, making them the first trial for war crimes by Syrian government agents. Anwar al-Bunni, a Syrian human rights lawyer living in exile in Germany, provided testimony as a witness on "the horrors and the bureaucratic structures of Assad's jails and torture chambers", based on his five years as a prisoner in Syria and from his legal experience in representing victims. Bunni worked with prosecutors to help find witnesses willing to testify in the trial. In a landmark ruling in February 2021, the court sentenced al-Gharib to 4 1/2 years in prison for aiding and abetting crimes against humanity through torture and the deprivation of liberty.

In January 2022, proceedings were launched at the Higher Regional Court in Frankfurt am Main against a Syrian doctor, Alaa M., suspected of crimes against humanity, including torturing opponents of Syrian President Bashar al-Assad while working as a doctor at a military prison and hospitals in Homs and Damascus in 2011 and 2012. In June 2025, he was sentenced to life imprisonment by the court for crimes against humanity on the basis of two deaths and eight cases of severe torture.

In December 2025, Germany's Public Prosecutor General charged Fahad A., a suspected former member of Syrian intelligence, with crimes against humanity and the torture and murder of dozens of prisoners held in a Damascus prison under al-Assad.

=== Islamic State, 2020–present ===
In February 2020, the Higher Regional Court in Frankfurt indicted Taha al-Jumailly, an Iraqi national who allegedly left a 5-year-old Yazidi girl he and his wife kept as a slave in Iraq to die of thirst in the heat, on charges of murder, membership of a foreign terrorist organization, genocide, crimes against humanity, war crimes and human trafficking. In what was the first genocide verdict against a member of Islamic State, the court found al-Jumailly guilty in 2021 of involvement in the slaughter of more than 3,000 Yazidis and enslavement of 7,000 women and girls by IS jihadists in 2014–15.

In 2024, German police arrested an Iraqi couple alleged to be Islamic State members on suspicion of genocide, crimes against humanity and war crimes for enslaving two Yazidi girls between 2015 and 2017 in Iraq and Syria. In July 2026, the Higher Regional Court in Munich convicted the pair of genocide, crimes against humanity and war crimes. The man was sentenced to life imprisonment, while his former partner received a juvenile sentence of nine years and six months. The court found that the couple had enslaved, physically abused and sexually assaulted the girls before transferring them to other Islamic State members as the group lost territory in Syria.

=== Gambia, 2021–2023 ===
In March 2021, the Public Prosecutor General had German police detain a Gambian man suspected of participating in crimes against humanity, including the killing of journalist Deyda Hydara, as a driver in the elite guard of former President Yahya Jammeh. In 2023, Higher Regional Court in Celle convicted him to life in prison for his role in the murders of at least three of Jammeh's opponents and an attack on a lawyer in 2003.

== See also ==
- International Criminal Court Act 2001
- Strafgesetzbuch
- Alaa Mousa (Syrian doctor)
