= Rasta militia =

Criminal group in the DR Congo

The Rastas (French: les Rasta) are an armed criminal group active in Eastern parts of the Democratic Republic of the Congo, believed to have been founded in 2004. Its members are predominantly Rwandan Hutus and former génocidaires and are believed to have ties to the Democratic Forces for the Liberation of Rwanda (FDLR) militia active in the same region. The Rastas live as fugitives in the Congolese forest and are heavily armed. They have engaged in acts of violent crime, including kidnapping, rape, burning babies and chopping their foes. Group members have adopted Rastafarian-style dreadlocks and wear Los Angeles Lakers jerseys and tracksuits.
