= Masisi, Democratic Republic of the Congo =

Masisi
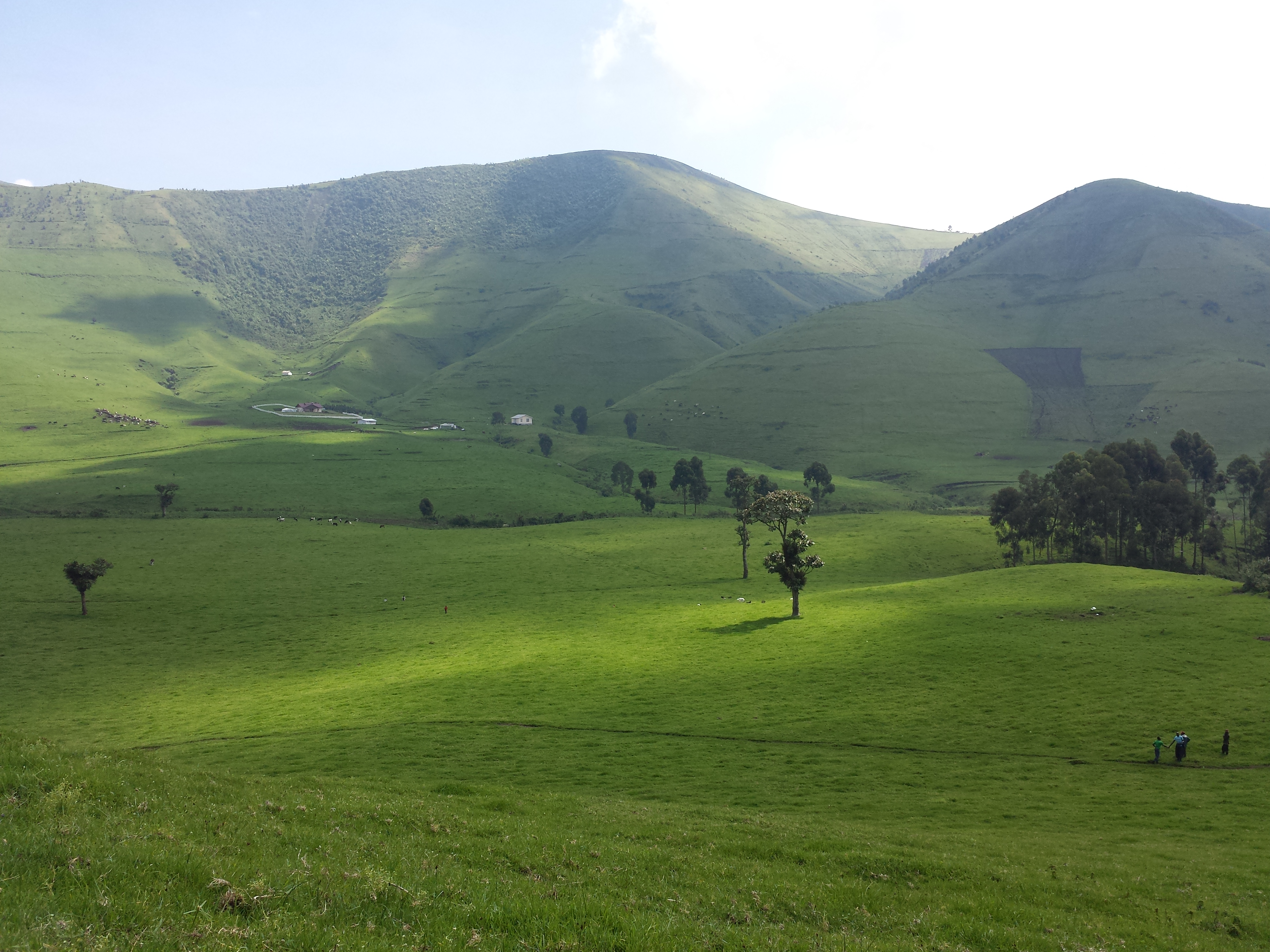

- Location within Democratic Republic of the Congo
- Coordinates: 01°24′00″S 28°49′05″E
- Country: Democratic Republic of the Congo
- Province: North Kivu
- Territory: Masisi Territory
- Elevation: 1,651 m (5,417 ft)

Population (2010)
  - Total: 6,502
- Time zone: UTC+2 (CAT)
- Climate: Am
- Main language: Swahili

Masisi is a town in the North Kivu Province in the east of the Democratic Republic of the Congo (DRC). It is the administrative center of the Masisi Territory.

== Location ==
Masisi lies approximately 69 kilometres (43 mi) by road, northwest of the provincial capital of Goma.

== Overview ==
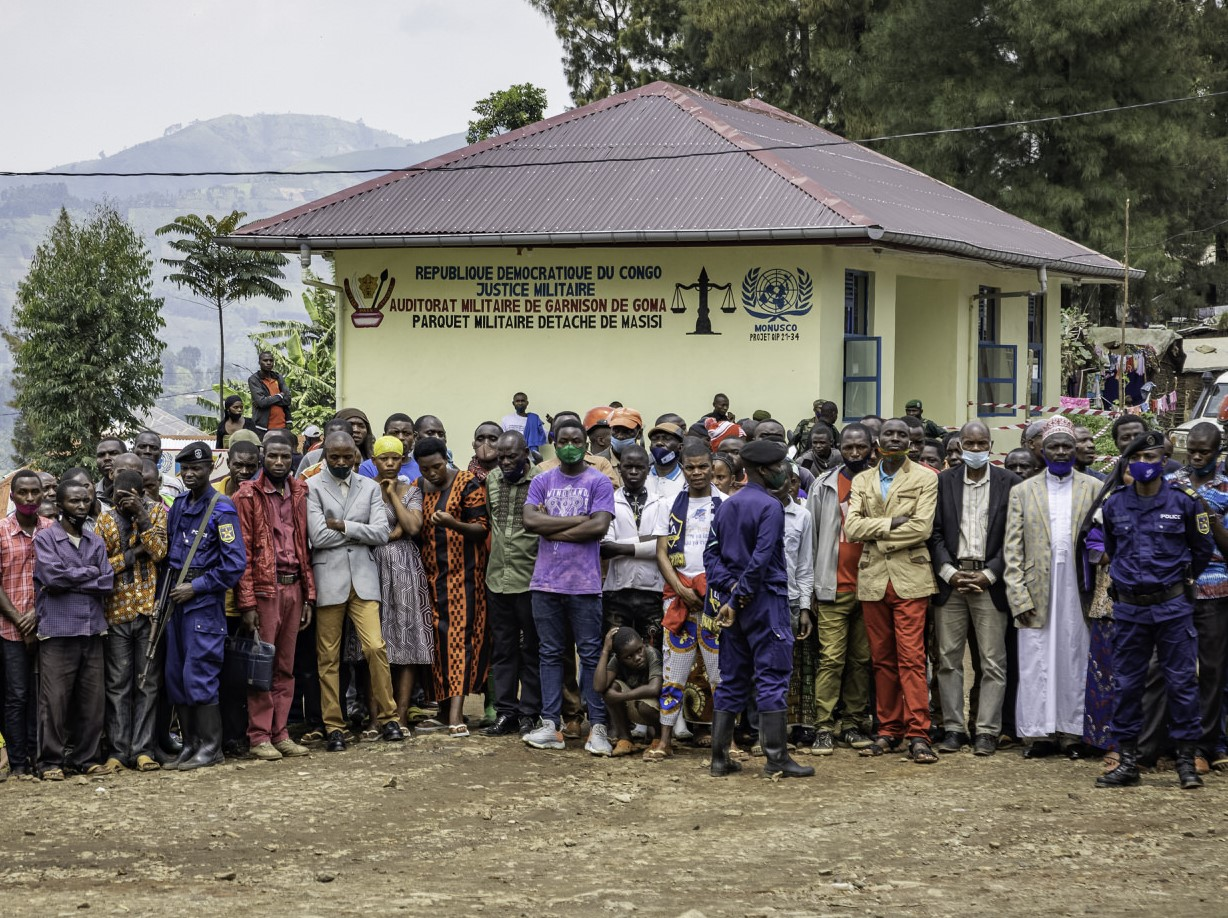
Masisi court house in Masisi Territory (MONUSCO financed the construction (by 2021) and equipment of the military prosecutor's office.)

The town lies at an altitude of 1,600 metres (5,200 ft) in the foothills of the Virunga Mountains. Masisi is the location of a number of cheese factories. Most of the cheese produced in the DRC comes from Masisi Territory.

During the last decade, Masisi and the surrounding countryside have witnessed strife and conflict as the many militias in this part of the country fought each other and against FARDC and MONUC, for territory and wealth. Many have either been killed or permanently disabled, with more carrying residual psychological trauma.

== Population ==
As of 2010, the population of Masisi is 6,502 people.

== See also ==
- United Nations Force Intervention Brigade
- March 23 Movement
- National Congress for the Defence of the People
- Rally for Congolese Democracy
- Rally for Congolese Democracy–Goma
- Democratic Forces for the Liberation of Rwanda
- Mai Mai
- Western Rift Valley
