= Ignace Murwanashyaka =

Rwandan rebel leader

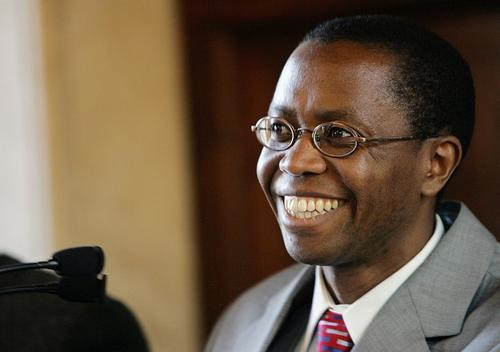
Ignace Murwanashyaka

Ignace Murwanashyaka (14 May 1963 – 16 April 2019) was a Rwandan rebel leader who led the Democratic Forces for the Liberation of Rwanda (FDLR), a Rwandan Hutu rebel group formed in 2000 composed of individuals responsible for the 1994 Rwandan genocide. Operating in eastern Democratic Republic of the Congo, the FDLR are responsible for large scale human rights violations and crimes against humanity, including rape on a massive scale.

== Life ==
Murwanashyaka was born in Butare and has studied economic sciences in West Germany, including a doctor's degree, and lived there since 1989, on asylum since 2000. He was married to a German woman and has children with her. Since 2001 he had been travelling between Germany and the Democratic Republic of Congo. In November 2005 he was blacklisted by the United Nations for violating an arms embargo aimed at promoting peace in the Democratic Republic of Congo, and subjected to a travel bans and assets freeze.

He was arrested on 7 April 2006 in Mannheim, Germany for immigration violations and released shortly after. On 26 May 2006 preliminary investigation were opened against him for "Initial suspicion of involvement in crimes against humanity in the Democratic Republic of Congo", but the prosecution has since been abandoned. Rwanda indicated it would seek his extradition for alleged crimes committed during the Rwandan genocide and has issued an arrest warrant.

He was arrested again on 17 November 2009 by the German authorities. The trial for him and his alleged aide Straton Musoni began on May 4, 2011 before the Oberlandesgericht in Stuttgart. They are accused of several counts of war crimes and crimes against humanity according to the German Völkerstrafgesetzbuch. Their trial is the first held in Germany for crimes against this law. In September 2015, Murwanashyaka was sentenced to 13 years, Musoni to 8 years, in prison. He had previously been in solitary confinement for six years in the terrorist wing of the high-security Stammheim Prison.

On 20 December 2018, the Federal Court of Justice overturned the judgment on revision of the defendant and the Public Prosecutor General as a whole. The new trial should have started in May 2019.

On 16 April 2019, Murwanashyaka died in the University Hospital Mannheim, after being transferred there from the infirmary of the Mannheim correctional facility, because he said he had a spinal problem. Until his death, he spent nine and a half years in German pre-trial detention without interruption, longer than any other accused in Germany before. He spent the time in solitary confinement.
