= 2017 Machakos County gubernatorial election =

Local election in Kenya

2017 Machakos gubernatorial election
- August 8, 2017

627,168 registered voters Simple Majority votes needed to win
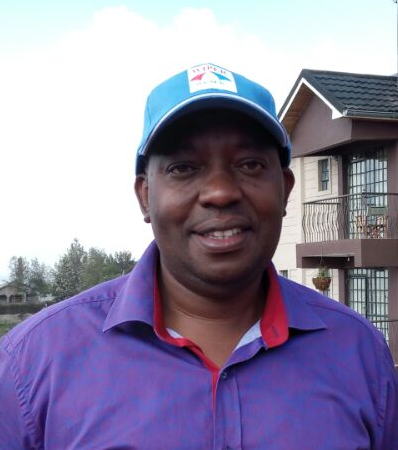
		incumbent
Nominee	Wavinya Ndeti	Alfred Mutua	Bernard Kiala
Party	Wiper Democratic Movement-Kenya	Maendeleo Chap Chap Party	Independent (Politician)
Alliance	NASA	Jubilee
Running mate	Peter Mathuki	Eng. Francis Maliti	Evelyn Mutula
Governor before election
Alfred Mutua
Wiper Democratic Movement-Kenya
Governor Elect
Alfred Mutua
TBD

The 2017 Machakos gubernatorial election took place on 8 August 2017 to elect the governor and deputy governor of Machakos, concurrently with Machakos Senator to the Senate as other Counties and Machakos MPs to the Kenya National Assembly and Elections of County Assembly MCAs.

== Nomination of Candidates ==
Incumbent governor Alfred Mutua had won the 2013 elections having run on a Wiper Democratic Movement-Kenya ticket. The Governor however decamped to his own new Maendeleo Chap Chap Party in 2015. Machakos, like most counties, holds primary elections for Governor then the winners pick their own running mates. The incumbent governor Mutua had avoided his deputy Bernard Kiala who had remained in Wiper Democratic Movement party. Alfred Mutua picked Francis Maliti as his running mate to contest for a final term as governor. The Jubilee party nominated Lemi Muia, a former Chief Officer in the county.

=== MoU Between Wiper and CCU Parties ===
The party primaries saw the rise of Wavinya Ndeti who rose from an underdog (at the beginning of the year) to favourite to win the elections on August 8. In a coalition deal captured in an MoU between Ms. Ndeti's Chama Cha Uzalendo and Kalonzo-led Wiper Democratic Movement-Kenya Ms Ndeti for the first time since in 2007 made a return to the party which was the most popular party in the county.

In the deal, the former Chama Cha Uzalendo leader was to resign from her party and in return be guaranteed the Wiper Party nomination for the Machakos Gubernatorial Election. The date of Wavinya's resignation from CCU would later be contested in a string of legal suits and petitions. According to the Wiper Party, Wavinya Ndeti had resigned from Chama Cha Uzalendo on the deadline day and had become a registered member of the Wiper Democratic Movement Kenya, through writing copied to the CCU secretary General and Registrar of Political Parties (Kenya). The MoU between the Wiper and CCU parties had also guaranteed the Wiper ticket running mate position to Peter Mathuki, the party's then Deputy Secretary-General. According to the MoU, Wavinya Ndeti and Peter Mathuki would share power in the Machakos County Government on an equal basis if they won.

Bernard Kiala was by then on the campaign trail for the Wiper Party Ticket nominations expressed concern that the deal was pre-emptive. An offer to Bernard Kiala for 30% control of the Machakos County Government in the event of a win had been initially tabled.

=== Repeated Wiper Nominations ===
Incumbent Deputy Governor Bernard Kiala cried foul on the entry of Wavinya Ndeti into the umbrella party and insisted the party should hold Primaries as opposed to the Direct Nomination implied in the pact between the Wiper and CCU parties. The Wiper party's National election board organized a nomination exercise that saw a landslide win for Wavinya Ndeti announced in spite of a boycott by Bernard Kiala. The political parties tribunal on Nominations nullified the results of the initial process and called for fresh nominations citing defiance of its orders. The second round of the nominations saw in a low voter turnout amid another boycott by Bernard Kiala and resulted in a win for Wavinya Ndeti. According to Bernard Kiala, The Wiper Party had rushed to conduct the fresh nominations before addressing the concerns in his petition to the political parties tribunal. Bernard Kiala had sought the tribunal's intervention on the agreement that was in force between the Wiper and the CCU parties. The pact had effectively guaranteed Wavinya Ndeti the Wiper nomination certificate regardless of nomination results while acknowledging Wavinya's membership in the CCU party according to Kiala and his supporters. This would form the basis of subsequent legal suits against Wavinya Ndeti's nomination by the Wiper Party.

=== Fallout within Wiper ===
Bernard Kiala who was the sole challenger to Wavinya Ndeti in the Wiper democratic Movement Kenya primaries quit the party, protesting disobedience of the court orders he had sought. Kiala sought to contest the gubernatorial seat as an Independent candidate, choosing scholar Evelyn Mutula as his running mate. Wavinya Ndeti Picked Peter Mathuki as running mate. Wavinya's nomination by Wiper Democratic Movement-Kenya didn't go well with former Spokesman of the party Johnstone MuthamaMuthama who was then-Senator for Machakos County. protested the move and declined to defend his Senatorial seat in what would result in the wiper party losing both the Gubernatorial and Senatorial seats in a county where it was considered dominant. Muthama claimed that defending his seat in the Senate with an impending win for either Alfred Mutua or Wavinya Ndeti in the gubernatorial position would make no positive change to the Machakos electorate he would be representing. Peter Kyalo Kyuli, a Wiper Party member and then County Assembly Member (MCA) for Wamunyu Ward in Machakos filed a petition against Wavinya's Nomination on the grounds that she was a stranger to the party. The Wiper Party member's petition also included a supporting affidavit from Johnson Muthama being a member of the party's national leadership organs.

=== Legal suits and Withdrawal by Candidates ===
As a consequence of the petition by Wiper Party Member Peter Kyalo Kyuli, an IEBC Tribunal Chaired by Commission Chairman Wafula Chebukati on June 8, 2017, nullified the candidature of Wavinya Ndeti on the grounds that she was a member of two political parties CCU and Wiper at the same time. In a rejoinder the Registrar of political parties Lucy Ndung’u regretted the decision saying that according to her database Wavinya is in the register of Wiper Democratic Movement-Kenya. The IEBC tribunal had relied heavily on the affidavit from the office of the Registrar of Political Parties. In a subsequent appeal, High Court Judge George Odunga stayed the decision and directed IEBC not to remove Wavinya Ndeti's Name from the Ballot faulting the manner at which the tribunal arrived at the decision.

A week before the general elections, Bernard Kiala and his running mate withdrew from the contest as what he claimed as a gesture to strengthen outcomes for the NASA coalition. Bernard Kiala claimed to be supporting the NASA coalition and did not wish for Alfred Mutua to take advantage of NASA's divided candidature. In doing so, Kiala however declined to explicitly endorse Wavinya Ndeti's candidature.

== General Elections and Petitions ==
The general election was finally held on August 8, 2017, with four candidates cleared to vie namely:- Alfred Mutua (MCC Party), Wavinya Ndeti (Wiper Party), Bernard Kiala (Independent) - in spite of belatedly withdrawing from the race, and Lemi Muia (Jubilee Party).

The incumbent governor Alfred Mutua went ahead to be announced as the winner of the Gubernatorial elections. This led to a protracted election petition which saw Mutua's election initially overturned at the Court of Appeal. The petition was ultimately decided at the Supreme Court in favor of Governor Mutua.
