= 2013 Machakos local elections =

Local elections in Kenya

Local elections were held in Machakos County to elect a Governor and County Assembly on 4 March 2013. Under the new constitution, which was passed in a 2010 referendum, the 2013 general elections were the first in which Governors and members of the County Assemblies for the newly created counties were elected. They will also be the first general elections run by the Independent Electoral and Boundaries Commission(IEBC) which has released the official list of candidates.

== Gubernatorial election ==
Candidate	Running Mate	Coalition	Party	Votes
Jimi, Mumina Fidel	Kithyaka, Joseph Muthami		United Democratic Forum Party	--
Kibua, Thomas Nzioki	Mutuku, Monicah Mueni		Democratic Party	--
Mutua, Alfred Nganga	Kiala, Benard Muia Tom		Wiper Democratic Movement – Kenya	--
Ndeti, Wavinya	Katuku, John Mutua		Chama Cha Uzalendo	--
Ndundu, Titus John	Mungui, Pascal Kiseli Basilio		Party of Democratic Unity	--
Wambua, Antony Mwau	Muli, Phillip Mulinge		Orange Democratic Movement	--

== Prospective candidates ==
The following are some of the candidates who have made public their intentions to run:

- Mutua Katuku
- Alfred Mutua Former Government Spokesman for the Republic of Kenya
- Wavinya Ndeti MP for Kathiani Constituency
- Titus Ndundu
- William Kivuvani
- Mutula Kilonzo Minister of State for Education(makueni county)
