= Johnson Muthama =

Kenyan politician

Hon.Johnson Nduya Muthama CBS
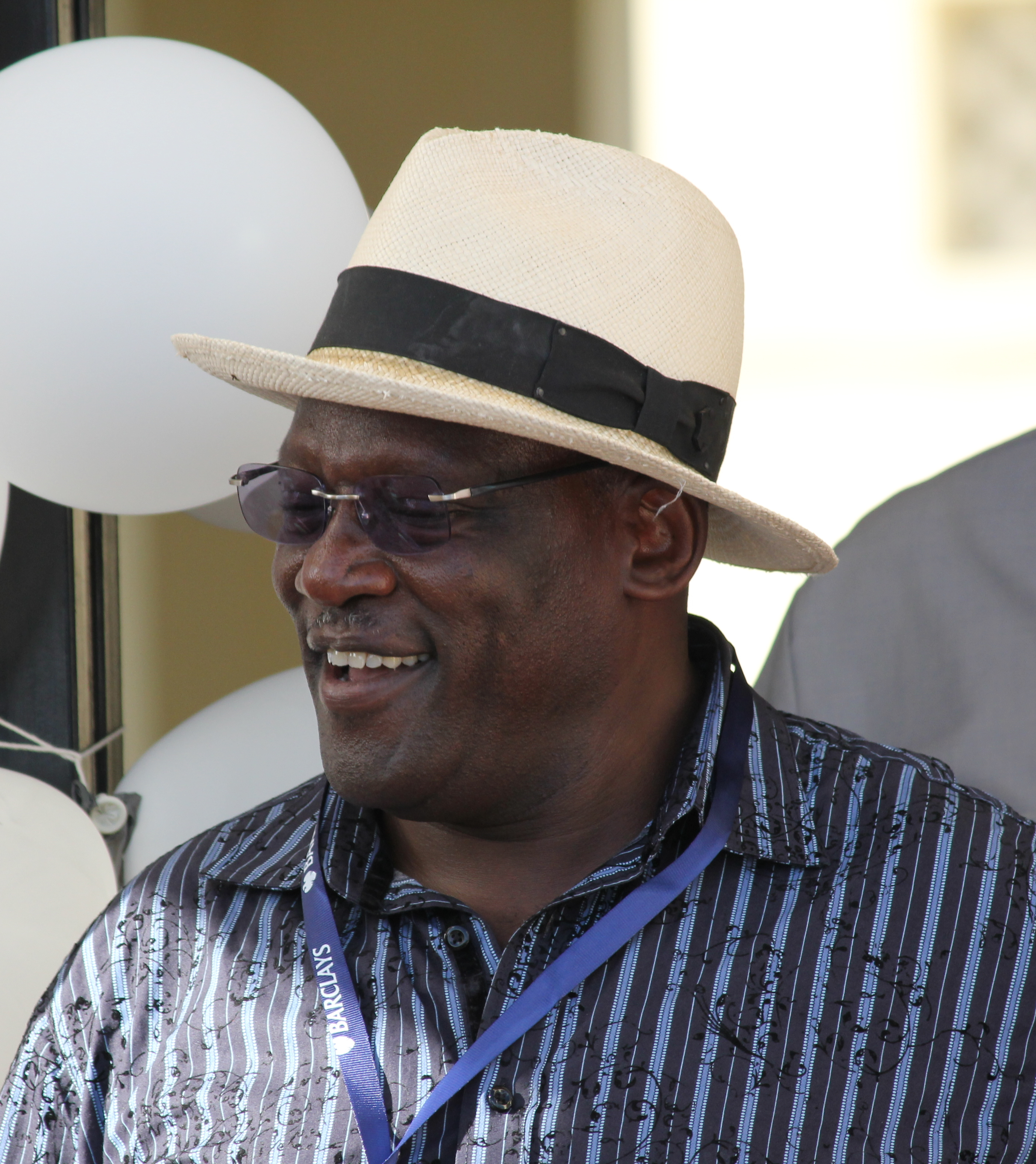

Member of the Kenyan Senate
- In office 28 March 2013 – 8 August 2017
- Preceded by: Paul Ngei (1966)
- Succeeded by: Boniface Kabaka
- Constituency: Machakos County

Member of the Kenyan Parliament
- In office 2008–2013
- Constituency: Kangundo

Personal details
- Born: Kenya Colony
- Party: UDA
- Education: Arden University, BA Hons Social Science
- Occupation: Businessman and Politician
- Awards: Chief of the Order of the Burning Spear (CBS)
- Website: https://web.facebook.com/SEN-johnson-muthama-111823743522032/

== Honours ==
On 12 December 2024 (Jamhuri Day), Muthama was conferred the Chief of the Order of the Burning Spear (CBS).

Johnson Nduya Muthama is a Kenyan businessman and politician. He is serving as a Commissioner of Parliamentary Service Commission.

He has also served as the chairperson of the ruling party (United Democratic Alliance) affiliated to President of the Republic of Kenya Dr William Ruto.

Muthama build the party from the scratch to be the most popular party in Kenya, with a majority in both the National Assembly and Senate.

Before joining the ruling party, Muthama played a critical role in National Super Alliance (NASA) and CORD in 2013 and 2017, respectively.

During the Kenya Kwanza campaigns in 2022, he was drawn to the President's agenda of the bottom up economic structure to support the common mwananchi.

== Education and personal life ==
Johnson Muthama obtained a Bachelor of Science in social science, from Arden University and is a graduate of the Gemological Institute of America. At the Arden University, Johnson Muthama obtained a First-class honours.

In July 2025, Muthama graduated from the University of Birmingham with a Master of Public Administration (MPA).

Muthama was previously married to Agnes Kavindu Muthama, a fellow politician who is currently Senator for Machakos County.

== Business life ==
Muthama's vast business interests include mining, real estate, infrastructure, and agriculture. He is also a member of the Kenya Chamber of Mines. Muthama's mining firm Rockland Kenya Limited trades in ruby red and green garnets.

== Political career ==
=== Before 2007 ===
Muthama once served as former ruling party KANU Vice Chairman in the larger Machakos District. He served under the Chairmanship of veteran Kamba politician, the late Joseph Mulu Mutusya. Muthama is credited with financially assisting the former Cabinet Minister Paul Ngei from being declared bankrupt soon after 1979 elections when Standard Bank Ltd served him with a bankruptcy note after it failed to locate Ngei’s assets to auction so as to recover Sh2 million debt.

=== Election terms served ===
Muthama was elected member of parliament (MP) for the larger Kangundo Constituency in 2007. He is credited with the split of the larger Kangundo Constituency giving birth to Matungulu Constituency. He was also elected as machakos senator from 2013 - 2017. He decided not to vie for a second term in solidarity with those who the wiper party had mistreated & denied them certificates after a shamble nomination process . Muthama became the Government Chief Whip in the 10th Parliament in the National Assembly of Kenya from 2007 to 2013.

=== National Politics ===
==== 2007 Presidential Elections ====
Muthama and others including David Musila were instrumental in negotiating for a coalition between retired President Mwai Kibaki and Wiper Leader Stephen Kalonzo Musyoka who became Vice President to calm tension after chaos erupted following the controversial 2007 Presidential elections before the Grand Coalition government was formed with ODM Leader Raila Odinga being appointed Prime Minister.

==== Roles in CORD and NASA ====
During his term as Senator between 2013 and 2017, he served as the first Senate Minority Whip under the Kenya Constitution 2010. Muthama also co-chaired the Opposition outfit Coalition for Reforms and Democracy (CORD). He went ahead to co-chair the national opposition movement management committee when the coalition transformed itself into National Super Alliance (NASA).

==== Position on compensation to MPs ====
As a first time legislator in 2008, being the member of parliament (MP) for Kangundo Constituency, Muthama took a stand that members of parliament are paid too generously. This according to him a situation not in tune with the economic realities of the rest of Kenyans. He earned the reputation of being the first MP to pay tax on his salary. He went against the wishes of the majority of fellow parliamentarians who were resisting the taxation of their salaries and were going as far as increasing their salaries. While not being an MP in 2019, he castigated the Kenyan legislators for awarding themselves extra house allowances.

==== Position on National Cohesion ====
In 2020, Muthama has taken an opposing position to the Building Bridges Initiative (BBI). He has asked Kenyans not to support the initiative blindly. He claimed that the initiative to change the Kenyan constitution appeared to amend the Kenya Government structures to address the self-interest of politicians rather than address challenges facing Kenyans. Muthama is reported to have made proposals to the BBI initiative through his Wiper Party. The party is reported to have refused to present Muthama's proposals to the BBI steering committee. This is reported to play out in what is considered a supremacy battle for control of Kenya's lower eastern voting block in Ukambani. While criticizing the BBI initiative in January 2020, Muthama requested President Uhuru Kenyatta to resist the temptation to cling on to power beyond his second and final constitutional term in 2022. According to Muthama, the solution to Kenya's perennial problem of election violence and negative ethnicity is the Country's Presidency being held rotationally among its ethnic communities.

==== Confrontation with Government ====
Muthama is one of the politicians who have openly disagreed with Kenya's Jubilee government leadership. He was affiliated to Kalonzo Musyoka, the presumed leader of the Kamba community in Kenya. In early November 2013, Muthama publicly announced that the government of Uhuru Kenyatta had withdrawn his security due to his stand over the ongoing cases in the International Criminal Court where Uhuru Kenyatta is facing trials. In 2013 Muthama's personal security as a legislator was withdrawn. Muthama went public to state that his life was in danger. The security withdrawal resulted in public uproar. Muthama stated that he was not going to relent from speaking the truth in spite of the security withdrawal.

In June 2016, Senator Muthama was among Eight Kenyan politicians arrested for alleged hateful public utterances. Six of the politicians were later arraigned in court. They were detained for four days in various police stations around Nairobi before reappearing in court. The charges against Senator Muthama were dropped on 28 July 2016.

==== Position on Komarock land held by KBC ====
In May 2020, Muthama led members of the public including local politicians in a day-long confrontation with public administration at a parcel of land in Koma Rock whose title is held by Kenya Broadcasting Cooperation (KBC). Muthama and his colleagues were protesting the surveying of the land parcel for allocation to squatters who hailed from Nairobi. Muthama is also enjoined in a legal dispute on the ownership of the land between the KBC and the Komarock Ranching and Farming Cooperative Society. According to Muthama, the land parcel constitutes community land held in trust for the residents of Matungulu and the larger Machakos County.

=== 2017 General elections ===
Johnson Muthama protested the nomination of Wavinya Ndeti as Wiper Party candidate for the office of the Machakos County Governor on the grounds that Wavinya who had been the CCU Party leader had been illegally enlisted into the Wiper party. When the Wiper party declined to rescind its decision to nominate Wavinya Ndeti, Muthama protested by declining to defend his Machakos County Senatorial position during the 2017 General Elections. He stated that it would be pointless to be elected to work alongside Alfred Mutua or Wavinya Ndeti as Governors. Muthama had thrown his support in the Machakos Gubernatorial Contest behind Bernard Kiala who he argued was the legitimate Wiper Candidate In the end, the Wiper Party lost both the Senatorial and Gubernatorial Seat in Machakos County. The Senatorial seat was won by Boniface Kabaka belonging to the less known CCU party. Muthama was reported to have abandoned the Wiper Party amid the challenges of the party primaries. In spite of protesting against The Wiper Party's candidate nomination exercise and declining to defend his Senatorial position, Muthama did not quit the Wiper party.

The Wiper party primaries which were considered to be flawed were argued to explain why the party lost the Machakos County Senatorial position previously held by Muthama, and the Gubernatorial seat retained by Alfred Mutua of MCCP who had used it in the past 2013 elections. This was considered unusual in a region where the party was considered dominant. In 2019, both political allies and foes in Machakos County urged Muthama to abandon the Wiper Party.

=== 2022 Machakos Gubernatorial Election ===
In December 2018, Muthama announced his intention to vie for the Machakos County Governor Position at planned 2022 General Elections in Kenya. Muthama has since the establishment of County Governments been opposed to the leadership of Alfred Mutua, as Machakos Governor. According to Muthama, any person that will succeed Alfred Mutua as Machakos Governor will face a rough time fixing what he considers as the mess that Mutua will leave behind.
