= Peter Mbithi =

Kenyan academic and veterinarian

- Born: 4 July 1956 (age 70); Kangundo, Machakos County, Kenya
- Citizenship: Kenya
- Education: Friends School Kamusinga
- Alma mater: University of Nairobi (Bachelor of Veterinary Medicine) (Master of Science in Veterinary Clinical Studies) (Doctor of Philosophy); University of Saskatchewan (Master of Veterinary Science)
- Occupations: Veterinary surgeon, Academic, University Administrator
- Years active: 1983 – present
- Known for: Veterinary Medicine, Academic Leadership
- Title: Former Vice Chancellor; University of Nairobi

Peter Mulwa Felix Mbithi (born 4 July 1956) is a Kenyan veterinary surgeon, academic and former academic administrator, who served as the 7th Vice-Chancellor of the University of Nairobi (UoN), Kenya's oldest public university, from January 2015, until July 2019. Before he became Vice Chancellor, he served as Deputy Vice Chancellor at UoN, responsible for Finance and Administration.

== Early life and education ==
Mbithi was born in Kangundo, Machakos County. In 1983, he obtained a Bachelor of Veterinary Medicine, from the University of Nairobi. In 1985, he obtained a Master of Science degree in Veterinary Clinical Studies, also from the UoN. Two years later he was awarded his third degree, a Master of Veterinary Science, by the University of Saskatchewan in Saskatoon, Saskatchewan, Canada. He attended a residency course at the Western College of Veterinary Medicine in Saskatoon, Saskatchewan, from 1986 until 1987. His fourth and terminal degree, a Doctor of Philosophy, was obtained from the University of Nairobi in 1995. His thesis was on studies on pseudoarthrosis of the bovine metacarpophalangeal joints. His research interests are clinical veterinary medicine and orthopedic surgery, wounding and traumatology with special interest in lameness, joint surgery and arthritides.

== Career ==
Prior to his appointment as Vice Chancellor, Mbithi was a professor of Veterinary Medicine, at the UoN. He held various administrative posts there, including Chairman of the Department of Veterinary Clinical Studies, Dean of the Faculty of Veterinary Studies and Principal of the College of Veterinary Sciences.

In his position as Vice Chancellor, Mbithi frequently acted as the university's media spokesperson and was called upon to speak at formal events. He also served as chair of the Inter-Public Universities Councils Consultative Forum (IPUCCF) Negotiations Committee during staff salary negotiations. In 2015 he was in the news because of disagreements with his deputy vice chancellor, who was subsequently recommended for dismissal.

In 2016 Mbithi was threatened with ejection from his position by the Kenya Universities Staff Union over disagreements about staff employment benefits. He was also the target of student protests over the university's policies concerning student residences.

In the end, the University Council of the UoN, rejected Mbithi's request for a contract extension. The Council then directed him to proceed on terminal leave in July 2019, six months before the expiry of his contractual tenure. He was replaced in acting capacity by Professor Isaac Mbeche, until a substantive vice-chancellor was appointed.

== Other considerations ==
On 12 December 2008 during Jamhuri Day celebrations Mbithi was awarded Elder of the Order of the Burning Spear (EBS) by former Kenyan President Mwai Kibaki.

== Succession table as Vice-Chancellor of the University of Nairobi ==
Preceded by George Magoha; 2005 – 2015	Vice Chancellor of the University of Nairobi; 2015 – 2019	Succeeded by Stephen Kiama; 2020 – 2025
