= Boniface Kabaka =

Kenyan politician (1966–2020)

Boniface Mutinda Kabaka

Senator from Machakos County
- In office January 27, 2017 – December 11, 2020

Personal details
- Born: January 1, 1966 Kabaa, Machakos County, Kenya
- Died: December 11, 2020 (aged 54) The Nairobi Hospital, Kenya
- Party: Chama Cha Uzalendo
- Children: 5
- Education: University of Nairobi

Boniface Mutinda Kabaka (January 1, 1966 – December 11, 2020) was a Kenyan politician who served as a Senator from Machakos County from 2017 until his death in 2020.

== Early life and education ==
Kabaka was born on January 1, 1966, in Machakos County. He received several degrees from the University of Nairobi, including master's degrees in business administration, law, and diplomacy, and a PhD in finance law.

== Career ==
Before becoming senator, he served on the Machakos County council under Machakos governor Alfred Mutua.

He was elected to the Senate on January 27, 2017, under the Chama Cha Uzalendo political party.

== Death ==
In late November 2020, Kabaka tested positive for COVID-19. He was also suffering from a blood clot in the head and on December 4, collapsed after complaining of a headache; he was rushed to The Nairobi Hospital in critical condition after suffering from a stroke in a hotel 4 days earlier. A schoolteacher was suspected of being responsible, and was taken in for questioning, but was released 1 day later. Kabaka died on December 11, 2020. He was buried on December 22 at his home in Mikuyuni village, Masinga in Machakos County.

After Kanaka's death, advocate Nzioka Waita tweeted: "Very saddened by the news of the death of Senator Kabaka. I join residents of Machakos County in passing my sincere condolences to the family".

Kabaka had two wives, Vascoline Katanu, who he had 2 children with, and Jeniffer Mueni, who he had 3 children with. After his death, they sued each other for his property.
