= Yatta Constituency =

Constituency in Kenya

Yatta
- constituency for the Parliament of Kenya
- Yatta Constituency within Machakos County

- Machakos County within Kenya
- County: Machakos
- Population: 172,583
- Area: 1,062 km^{2} (410.0 sq mi)

Current constituency
- Number of members: 1
- Party: Wiper
- Member of Parliament: Robert Basil Ngui
- Wards: 5

Yatta Constituency is an electoral constituency in Kenya. It is one of 8 constituencies in Machakos County. The constituency was established for the 1945 elections. Yatta residents elect a young energetic politician Hon. Robert Basil.

== Members of Parliament ==
| Elections | MP | Party | Notes |
|---|---|---|---|
| 1963 | Gideon Munyao Mutiso | APP | |
| 1969 | Gideon Munyao Mutiso | KANU | One-party system |
| 1974 | Simon Kitheka Kiilu | KANU | One-party system |
| 1979 | Richard Matheka Kakoi | KANU | One-party system |
| 1988 | Gideon Munyao Mutiso | KANU | One-party system. |
| 1992 | Gideon Munyao Mutiso | KANU | |
| 1997 | Francis P. Wambua(Kyole) | SDP | |
| 2002 | James Philip Mutiso | NARC | Mutiso died due to flash floods in 2003 |
| 2003 | Charles Mutavi Kilonzo | NARC | By-election |
| 2007 | Charles Mutavi Kilonzo | ODM-Kenya | |
| 2013 | Francis Mwangangi Kilonzo | Muungano | |
| 2017 | Charles Mutavi Kilonzo | Independent | |
| 2022 | Hon. Robert Basil | Wiper Party | |

== Locations and wards ==
Locations
| Location | Population |
| Ikombe | 18,062 |
| Katangi | 10,972 |
| Kinyaata | 18,635 |
| Kithimani | 25,974 |
| Kyua | 11,950 |
| Matuu | 27,794 |
| Mavoloni | 17,446 |
| Ndalani | 22,152 |
| Total | 152,985 |

Wards
| Ward | Registered Voters | County Assembly |
| Kithimani | 4,549 | Machakos County Assembly |
| Matuu | | Machakos County Assembly |
| Ikombe | 6,693 | Machakos County Assembly |
| Katangi | 7,411 | Machakos County Assembly |
| Ndalani | 8,072 | Masaku county |
| Total | 53,045 | |
*September 2005.
