= Mombasa Cement Limited =

Kenyan manufacturing company

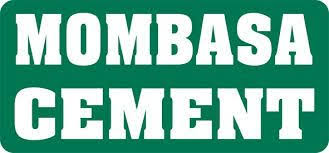
- Type: Private
- Industry: Manufacture of Construction Materials
- Founded: 2007; 19 years ago
- Headquarters: Mombasa, Kenya
- Products: Cement
- Brands: NYUMBA
- Website: Homepage

Mombasa Cement Limited (0706/01/85/07) (MCL) is an industrial company in Kenya specializing in the manufacture of construction materials. The company maintains its headquarters in the city of Mombasa and has offices and warehouses in Nairobi, with manufacturing plants in Athi River in Machakos County and in Vipingo, in Kilifi County. According to its website, as of May 2022, MCL had installed production capacity of 3.3 million metric tonnes of cement annually. The privately owned business markets its products under the NYUMBA brand.

== Location ==
The headquarters of MCL are located in the neighborhood called Mikindani, in the port city of Mombasa, along the shores of the Indian Ocean. The geographical coordinates of the company headquarters are 04°00′28″S 39°39′02″E, Latitude:-4.007778; Longitude:39.617222).

== Overview ==
Mombasa Cement Limited is a large cement manufacturer in Eastern Africa. As of March 2016, MCL was the second-largest producer of cement in Kenya, with a 15.8 percent market share, behind market leader Bamburi Cement with a 32.6 percent market share, but ahead of third-placed East African Portland Cement Company, with 15.1 percent market share.

== Philanthropy ==
Mombasa Cement Limited is a family-owned business. The patriarch is described as "shy" and prefers to remain anonymous. Under his leadership, MCL supports a program that distributes food to over 40,000 Mombasa residents every week. The program started in 2008, on year after MCL was founded and has run continuously since.

It has also set up schools and police stations, including the Sahajanand Special School, a school serving over 800 children with physical and mental disabilities.

In 2017, the company partnered with Mombasa County to refurbish the Mombasa Tusks Monument.

== Mombasa Cement Wind Power Station ==
In 2018, the company's clinker factory in Vipingo missed work on 16 days in the year, on account of electricity blackouts imposed by Kenya Power and Lighting Company (KPLC), the national electricity utility distribution company. This led to the cement maker missing its production and financial targets for the year. To mitigate against the unreliable power supply, Mombasa Cement decided to build this wind farm to power its clinker and grinding factories in Kilifi County, with the surplus power sold to KPLC.

== See also ==
- Mombasa Cement Wind Power Station
