= Mutua Katuku =

Kenyan politician

John Mutua Katuku (born in 1965) is a Kenyan politician who served as the Cabinet Minister for Water and Irrigation from 2006 to 2007. He was the Member of Parliament for Mwala Constituency in Machakos County from 1997 to 2007. Mutua Katuku was a Deputy Gubernatorial aspirant in Machakos County in the March 2013 general elections as the running mate to Wavinya Ndeti on a Chama Cha Uzalendo political party ticket. He ran for the Machakos County senatorial by-election of 19 March 2021 on a Maendeleo Chap Chap Party ticket and withdrew from the race two days before voting day.

== Education ==
John Mutua Katuku holds a Bachelor of Arts university degree from the University of Nairobi, and a Master of Arts postgraduate degree in Sociology from Kenyatta University.

== Early life ==
In 1996 and 1997, Mutua Katuku worked as a community development officer and administrator at the Child Welfare Society of Kenya.

Katuku was chairman of the strategy caucus that orchestrated the formation of the National Alliance of Kenya political party in 2002.

== Politics ==
Mutua Katuku succeeded Martha Karua as the Kenyan Cabinet Minister for Water and Irrigation in 2006.

He has held a seat in the Kenyan parliament as the Member of Parliament for MWala constituency from 1997 to 2007.

John has vied for different political positions over the years in Kenya's elections. He vied for the Machakos County Senate seat and lost in the 2022 general elections on a People's Trust Party (PTP) ticket.
