= Machakos County Governor =

Governor of Machakos County
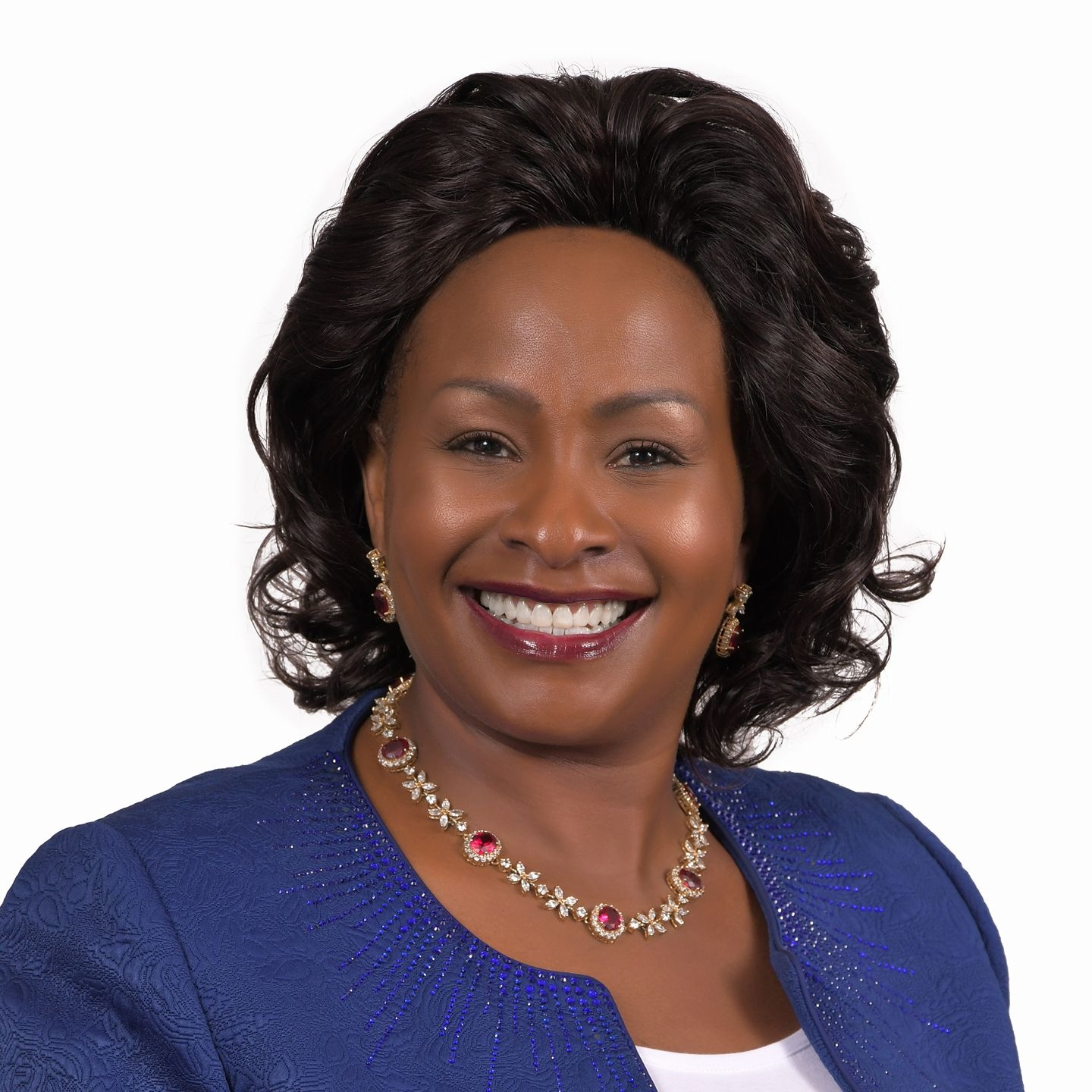
- Incumbent; Hon Wavinya Ndeti since 25th of Aug 2022
- Residence: Machakos Town
- Term length: 5 years, Renewable once
- Inaugural holder: Her Excellency Governor Wavinya Ndeti
- Formation: March 27, 2013; 13 years ago
- Salary: kshs.13,340,076 PA
- Website: www.machakosgovernment.go.ke

The Machakos County Governor is the chief executive of the Machakos and the various agencies and departments over which the officer has jurisdiction, as prescribed in the Republic of Kenya Constitution 2010. It is a directly elected position, votes being cast by popular suffrage of residents of Machakos County. The governor is responsible for enacting laws passed by the Machakos County Assembly.

Machakos is one of the 47 devolved governments in the Republic of Kenya. The current governor is a Wiper Democratic Movement-Kenya Alfred Mutua, who is also the inaugural holder of the office on 27 March 2013.

== Qualifications ==
A person may be nominated as a candidate for an election under Kenya Elections Act 2012 only if that person—

1. Is qualified to be elected to that office under the Constitution and Elections Act 2012; and
2. Holds a certificate, diploma or other post-secondary school qualification acquired after a period of at least three months study, recognized by the relevant Ministry and in such manner as may be prescribed by the Commission under Elections Act 2012.
3. In regardless of qualification (2) a person may be nominated as a candidate for election as President, Deputy President, county Governor or deputy county Governor only if the person is a holder of a degree from a university recognised in Kenya.
