= Stephen Kiama =

Kenyan academic and veterinarian

- Born: 1964 (age 61–62); Othaya, Nyeri County, Kenya
- Citizenship: Kenya
- Education: University of Nairobi (Bachelor of Veterinary Medicine) (Master of Veterinary Anatomy); University of Bern (Doctor of Philosophy in Structural Biology)
- Occupations: Veterinary surgeon, Academic, University Administrator
- Years active: 1990 – present
- Known for: Veterinary Medicine, Academic Leadership
- Title: Vice Chancellor; University of Nairobi

Stephen Gìtahi Kìama (born 1964) is a Kenyan veterinary surgeon and academic who, effective 6 January 2020, served as the 8th vice chancellor of the University of Nairobi, the oldest public university of Kenya. The Vice-Chancellor is the Chief Executive of the university and as further provided for in the Charter is the Academic and Administrative head of the university On 2 August 2024, Prof. Stephen Kiama was suspended from the position of Vice-Chancellor of the University of Nairobi, as announced by Prof. Amukowa Anangwe, the chairperson of the university's council. Prof. Amukowa Anangwe's appointment was on 22 February 2025 revoked by the Education Cabinet Secretary Julius Migos Ogamba, citing mismanagement, staff interference, and governance conflicts at the university.

== Background and education ==
According to his online curriculum vitae, he was born in Othaya, Nyeri County in central Kenya, in 1964. After attending local elementary and secondary schools, he was admitted to the University of Nairobi (UoN), in 1986. He graduated in 1990, with a Bachelor of Veterinary Medicine. He followed that with a Master of Veterinary Anatomy, in 1995, also at UoN. Later in 2001, he graduated with a Doctor of Philosophy in Structural Biology from the University of Bern in Switzerland.

== Career ==
Upon his graduation with his first degree, Kìama was hired as an assistant lecturer at the University of Nairobi. Over time, he rose through the ranks, making lecturer, senior lecturer, associate professor and full professor. At the time of his appointment as vice chancellor, he was the Deputy Vice Chancellor for human resource and administration, and acting vice chancellor in-charge of finance, planning and development.

As of 2020, Kìama has spent the last 34 years of his adult life at UoN, either as a student, academic employee or university administrator. He is credited with raising, in collaboration with others, a total of KSh1.018 billion (approximately US$10.2 million), from donors and sponsors towards university and related programs.

== Other considerations ==
Kiama served as the founding director of the Wangari Maathai Institute for Peace and Environmental Studies, at the UoN. He also secured full scholarships for 16 post-doctorate, PhD and MSc students at the university. At the time he was appointed Vice Chancellor, he was the chairman of the University Executive Board committee responsible for record management which oversaw digitisation of student records and the establishment of a biometric student platform.

Dendritic cells, Natural Products, Macrophages, and Pecten oculi, are among his topical research interests. As of January 2020, Professor Kiama had supervised 12 PhD and 14 MSc students who completed their studies at Makerere University, Rhodes University and the University of Nairobi. He was also actively supervising three more at the time. He has published widely in peer-reviewed journals and is credited with over 140 journal and conference publications, and has over 4,000 citations.

Professor Kiama's administration, as the vice chancellor of the University of Nairobi, is anchored on data-driven management, governance reforms, curricula reforms, financial reforms, and people-focussed reforms, comprising a five-point reform agenda for the university.

== See also ==
- George Magoha

== Succession table as Vice-Chancellor of the University of Nairobi ==
Preceded by Peter Mbithi; 2015 – 2019	Vice Chancellor of the University of Nairobi; 2020 – 2025	Succeeded by To be determined 2025 – 2030
