= Matungulu =

Matungulu is an administrative division in Machakos County, Kenya. It is part of the Matungulu Constituency. It contains the town of Tala.

== History ==
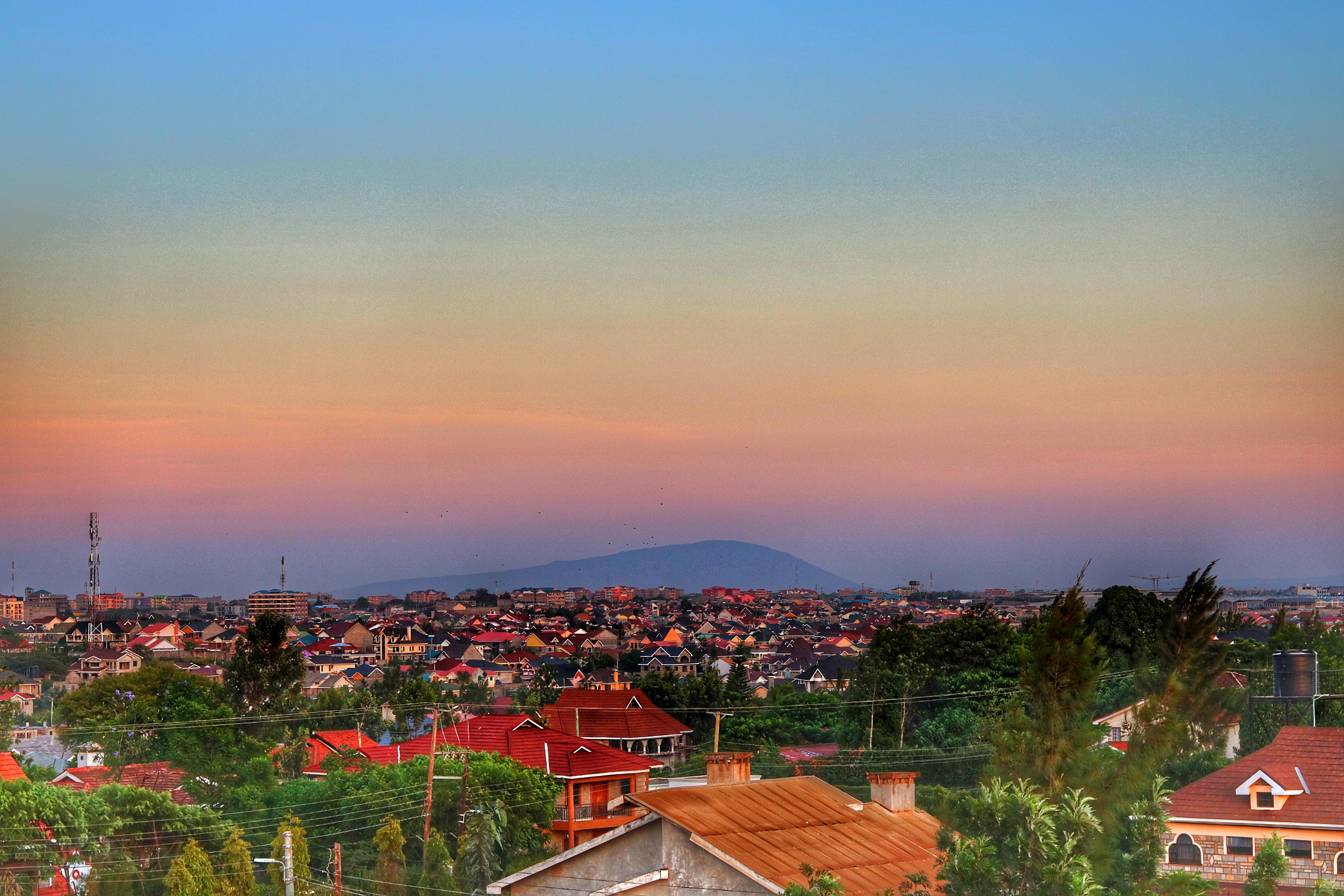
Ol Donyo Sabuk Mountain

Matungulu was established as a settlement in the early 1920s by the colonial government. The area is generally flat, with one large hill named Ol Donyo Sabuk, which means Buffalo Hill in Maasai. The Maasai of Kenya are nomadic people who used to bring their animals to graze in these plains when many buffalo roamed, hence the name.

Colonial settlers evicted many local people and established coffee plantations. The people who chose to stay became squatters and worked on the settlers' coffee farms. After Kenya's independence in 1963, the settlers sold their coffee plantations to local co-operative societies and left the country. Much of the area had not been cultivated, and the squatters moved in and subdivided it among themselves.
