= David Mulwa =

Kenyan writer (1945–2025)

David Kakuta Mulwa
- Born: 9 April 1945; Mukaa, Machakos District, Colony and Protectorate of Kenya
- Died: 5 December 2025 (aged 80); Nairobi, Kenya
- Education: Nairobi University
- Occupations: Actor, writer
- Awards: Hero's award

David Kakuta Mulwa (9 April 1945 – 5 December 2025) was a Kenyan writer, academic, theatre director and actor. He was a theatre arts lecturer in Kenyatta University's School of Visual and Performing Arts.

== Background ==
Born in Mukaa, Machakos County, Kenya, Mulwa attended Nairobi University. Encouraged by his professors, he attended UCLA with a Rockefeller Foundation scholarship and earned a masters degree in theatre. In 1974, Mulwa joined Kenyatta University, Nairobi.

Mulwa died in Nairobi on 5 December 2025, at the age of 80.

== Career ==
Mulwa started his teaching career in Mukaa High School and Kangundo High School, Machakos between 1968 and 1970. He went to Ohio University where he was a teaching assistant in English before proceeding to Athens between 1979 and 1980. He then moved to Kenyatta University, where he was for over 34 years.

He taught theatre (History of theatre), drama, playwriting, directing and acting.

Mulwa was an adjudicator in the Kenya Drama Festivals Committee, Nairobi, from 1978 and also served as a member in the governing council, Kenya Cultural Centre Committee, Nairobi.

== Awards ==
Mulwa was given a Hero's award by the Kenyatta University's governing council and also received two recognitions from the Kenya Film Commission, the Kalasha Award for lifetime Achievement and Theatre Lifetime Achievement.

== Bibliography ==
- Bahati’s Love Nest, 2017
- Flee, Mama Flee, 2014
- We Come in Peace, Oxford University Press, 2011
- Katende Says "No", 2007
- Inheritance, Longhorn Publishers, 2004
- Crocodile’s Jaw, 2003
- Clean Hands, Oxford University Press, 2000
- Glasshouses, Oxford University Press, 2000
- Redemption, Longman House, 1990
- Master and Servant, Longman House, 1987
- Daraja, Oxford University Press, 1986
- Mkimbizi, 1988 (with A. S Yahya)
- Ukame, 1984 (with A. S Yahya)
- Buriani, 1983 (with A. S Yahya)
