= Tala, Kenya =

Tala
- Town Council
- Location within Kenya
- Coordinates: 1.35°S 37.37°E
- Country: Kenya
- County: Machakos County
- Elevation: 1,544 m (5,066 ft)

Population (2009)
  - Metro: 218,557
- Time zone: UTC+3 (EAT)

Tala is a town in Machakos County, located in the lower eastern region of Kenya and about 56 kilometres east of the Kenyan capital, Nairobi. It is usually classified as being one town with Kangundo, due to their close proximity. It is 3,000 ft above sea level. Tala is a location of Matungulu division. It also part of Matungulu Constituency.

== People/Languages ==
The main language spoken is Kikamba although the people who live there understand both Swahili and English.

== Kangundo-Tala ==
Officially Kangundo is located in Nairobi Metro and its population when combined with Tala is the 8th largest of any urban area in Kenya. Tala is part of Kangundo town council. The CDF office of Matungulu Constituency is also located in the town.

== Towns in Machakos County ==
Town	Population (2009)	Rank in Kenya (Population Size)
Kangundo-Tala	218,557	9
Machakos	150,041	13
Athi River	139,380	15
Kathiani	3,365	195
Masii	2,501	211

* 2009 census. Source:

== Economy ==
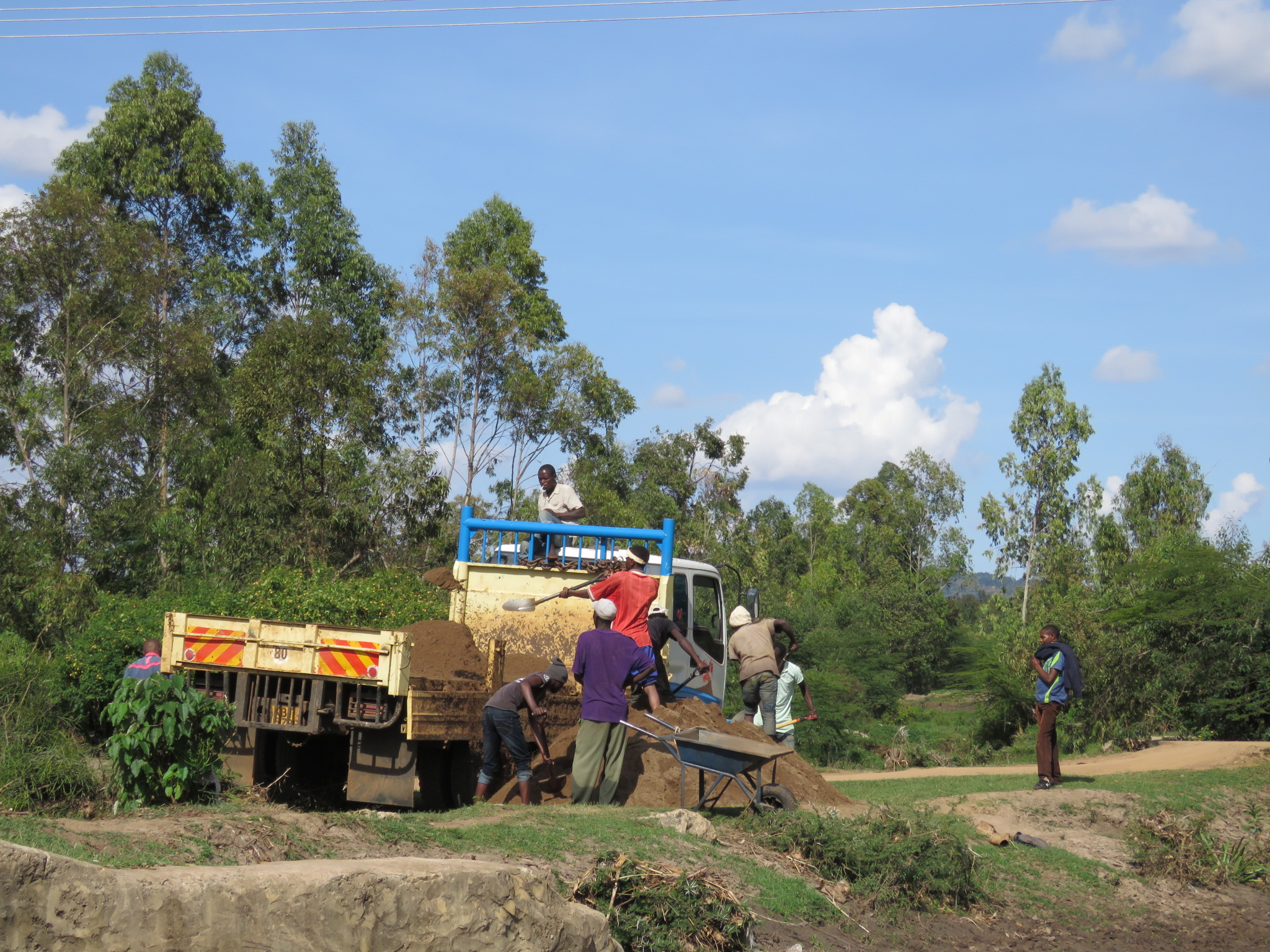
Sand harvesting in Tala.

Many of its residents are Kambas who practice subsistence farming on rural farms. The land holding size is relatively small and population density is high. Open-air markets are located in downtown Tala and main market days are Tuesday and Friday. Farmers come to sell their wares on these days which include paw paws, bananas, arrow roots, cowpea leaves (a vegetable delicacy in the area), maize and beans. Livestock trading is also a major enterprise during the market days. Crops grown are mostly maize, bean, sorghum, millet, sweet potatoes, onions, bananas and others which can cope with the tropical climate of the area. Apart from the mentioned crops, farmers also grow coffee as a cash crop. Initially, the returns were good but farmers keep on complaining of low prices which has led to the neglect of the crop. However, farmers who mill their coffee and take it directly to KPCU make good profits.

== Climate ==
There are two rainy seasons during the year from November–January and again from March–April. February and May are the main harvesting periods and June–August are the colder months.

== Education ==
Several schools exist in the town, including Tala High School, Mackenzie Education Centre – Tala, Tala Girls' High School, Kwatombe Primary School, Tala Boys' Primary School and Children's Home, Tala Academy and Holy Rosary College (formerly, Tala Secretarial College). A police post is also located in the town.

In October 2007, a number of students from King George V School in Hong Kong took part in a charity and service trip to Tala Boys' Primary School and Children's Home, where they spent days interacting with the children, renovating the classrooms and building pavements for those in need.

Holy Rosary College is located roughly 1.5 kilometers west of downtown. It is an all-girls college (roughly 70–90 students) and classes run year-round. There are several programs offered including: Information Technology (IT), business administration and secretarial. It is accredited to the Jomo Kenyatta University of Agriculture and Technology. The courses offered in conjunction with JKUAT include, Business Information Technology, Business Administration, Public Relations, Information Technology and Bridging Certificate Course in Maths. It is also a Cisco Local Academy. At present the college has about 200 students.

== Nairobi Metro ==
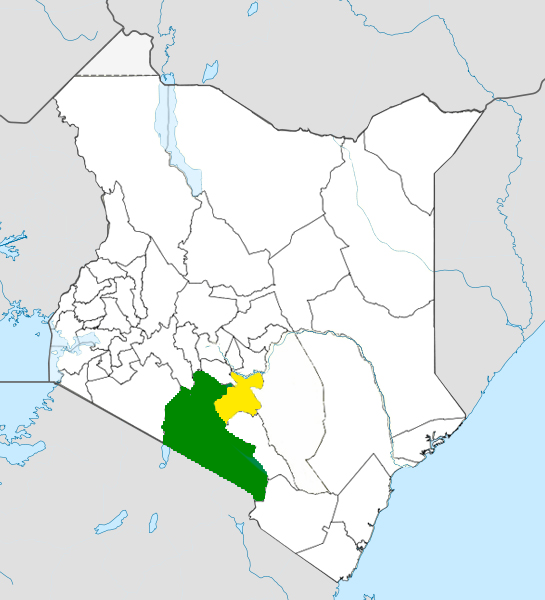
Machakos County (yellow) within Nairobi Metro (green)

Machakos County is within Greater Nairobi which consists of 4 out of 47 counties in Kenya but the area generates about 60% of the nations wealth. The counties are:

Area	County	Area (km^{2})	Population Census 2009	Cities/Towns/Municipalities in the Counties
Core Nairobi	Nairobi County	694.9	3,138,369	Nairobi
Northern Metro	Kiambu County	2,449.2	1,623,282	Kiambu, Thika, Limuru, Ruiru, Karuri, Kikuyu
Southern Metro	Kajiado County	21,292.7	687,312	Kajiado, Olkejuado, Bissil, Ngong, Kitengela, Kiserian, Ongata Rongai
Eastern Metro	Machakos County	5,952.9	1,098,584	Kangundo-Tala, Machakos, Athi River
Totals	Nairobi Metro	30,389.7	6,547,547	

Source: NairobiMetro/ Kenya Census

== See also ==
- Kangundo
- Machakos County
