= Bernard Kiala =

First deputy governor of Machakos County, Kenya

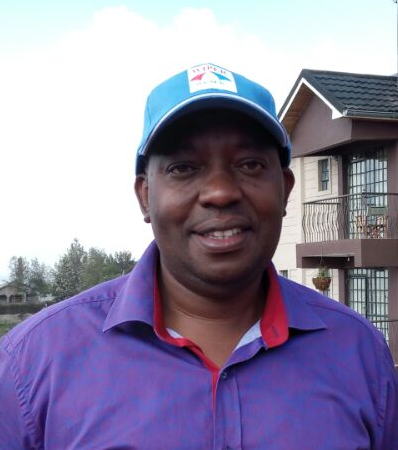

1st Deputy Governor Machakos
- In office 27 March 2013 – 17 August 2017
- Preceded by: Eng. Maliti

Personal details
- Born: 14 July 1968 (age 58) Masinga Constituency, Machakos, Kenya
- Party: Wiper Democratic Movement
- Spouse: Zipporah Mwikali
- Education: University of Nairobi; BA in Economics
- Website: bernardkiala.com

Bernard Muia Kiala (born 14 July 1968), is the first Deputy Governor of Machakos County. He was born in Masinga Sub-County.

== Education ==
Bernard Kiala holds a Bachelor of Arts Degree in Economics from The University of Nairobi.

== Professional career ==
Bernard Kiala has spent most of his career in the banking sector. He was employed by Trade Bank in 1993 after which he worked for CFC Stanbic Bank from 1994 to 2002.

== Political career ==
In March 2013, Bernard Kiala was elected alongside Dr. Alfred Mutua as the Deputy Governor of Machakos County on a Wiper Democratic Movement Party ticket. Corruption accusations and counter-accusations between Dr. Alfred Mutua and Bernard Kiala have since 2014 created a frosty relationship between them. The two are Leader and Deputy leader of the Machakos County Executive respectively.

Bernard Kiala survived an impeachment process against him in 2014. Initially, the Machakos County Assembly voted to impeach him for allegations of insubordination to Governor Alfred Mutua, nepotism and abuse of office. The impeachment was however overturned by the Kenyan Senate. In his evidence against the impeachment motion at the senate, Bernard Kiala stated that he was only being a victim of revenge by corruption cartels in the County Government

=== 2017 Gubernatorial Contest ===
Bernard Kiala was among Deputy Governors in Kenyan counties who have declared intentions to compete with their county's Governors in the upcoming 2017 general election in the country. He was involved in what he termed as unfair party primaries of the Wiper Party which he belonged to and was then dominant in Machakos County. After a brief attempt to vie as an independent candidate, Bernard Kiala withdrew from the contest a week before the elections, citing a need to strengthen the overall candidature of the National Super Alliance which he subscribed to.

== Philanthropy ==
Bernard Kiala's philanthropic organisation, The Kiala Foundation provides civic and economic empowerment to the youth, women and rural organised groups. The foundation also gives bursaries to needy students.
