= Pasha Centre =

Digital villages project in Kenya

Pasha Centre Logo

A Pasha Centre is an ICT facility in rural Kenya, intended to provide rural communities with access to computer and internet services. Pasha Centres are run by private entrepreneurs who have gone through the training program initiated by Kenya ICT Board. Entrepreneurs who have undergone training are eligible to apply for a Pasha development loan from a revolving fund set up by the Kenya ICT Board.

Pasha is a Swahili word meaning "to inform".

== History ==
The first Pasha centre was launched in July 2009 in Kangundo, the first of six four-month trial centres planned by the Kenya ICT Board, working in partnership with Cisco Systems and The Copy Cat Limited. The other five locations were Malindi (Coast Province), South Imenti (Eastern Province), Garissa (North-Eastern Province), Siaya (Nyanza Province) and Mukuru Kiaba (Nairobi Province).
