= Agnes Kavindu =

Kenyan woman politician

Agnes Kavindu Muthama is a Kenyan politician who currently serves as Machakos Senator. She was voted on a Wiper ticket to serve as the Senator for Machakos County on 19 March 2021. She also served as Tanathi Water Service Board from 2018 to 2021.

== Life ==
She was the ex-wife of former Machakos Senator Johnson Mutha.In 2018, She attended Outreach International Bible College and graduated with a degree. In February 2026, she loss her only son Moses Muthama who reportedly developed sudden breathing complications and was rushed to a hospital for medical attention but was pronounced dead upon presentation at the hospital.
