= Kathiani Constituency =

Kenyan electoral constituency

Kathiani
- constituency for the Parliament of Kenya
- Kathiani Constituency within Machakos County

- Machakos County within Kenya
- County: Machakos
- Population: 111,890
- Area: 204 km^{2} (78.8 sq mi)

Current constituency
- Number of members: 1
- Party: Wiper
- Member of Parliament: Robert Mbui
- Wards: 4

Kathiani Constituency is an electoral constituency in Kenya. It is one of eight constituencies in Machakos County. The constituency was established for the 1988 elections.

== Members of Parliament ==
Elections	MP	Party	Notes
1988	Laban Maingi Kitele	KANU	One-party system.
1992	Jackson Kimeu Mulinge	KANU	
1997	Peter Kyalo Kaindi	SDP	
2002	Peter Kyalo Kaindi	NARC	
2007	Wavinya Ndeti	CCU	
2013	Robert Mbui	WDM-K	
2017	Robert Mbui	WDM-K	

| 2017 || Robert Mbui || |WDM-K]] ||

== Locations and wards ==
Locations
Location	Population
Iveti	29,573
Kaewa	24,751
Katani	13,984
Kathiani	27,377
Lukenya	29,573
Mitaboni	35,148
Settled Area	28,051
Total	x

Wards
Ward	Registered Voters	Local Authority
Athi River West	6,934	Mavoko municipality
Iveti	11,109	Masaku County Council
Kaewa	8,449	Masaku County Council
Katani	5,806	Mavoko municipality
Kathiani	10,094	Masaku County Council
Kinanie / Mathatani	4,291	Mavoko municipality
Makadara	7,691	Mavoko municipality
Mitaboni	12,828	Masaku County Council
Muthwani	1,921	Mavoko municipality
Sophia / Kenya Meat	7,324	Mavoko municipality
Total	76,447	
*September 2005.
