= Mombasa Cement Wind Power Station =

Wind farm in Kenya

- Country: Kenya
- Location: Vipingo, Kilifi County
- Coordinates: 03°49′16″S 39°49′07″E
- Status: Operational
- Construction began: 2019
- Commission date: 2019
- Owner: Mombasa Cement Limited
- Operator: Mombasa Cement Limited

Solar farm
- Type: Wind
- Site area: 1,200 hectares (4.6 sq mi)

Power generation
- Nameplate capacity: 36 MW (48,000 hp)

Mombasa Cement Wind Power Station, is a 36 MW (48,000 hp) wind power plant in Kenya. The wind farm was developed and is owned by Mombasa Cement Limited, the second-largest manufacturer of cement in Kenya, with an annual output of 1.6 million tonnes annually as of November 2019. The output of this power station is intended for use in the company's clinker factory in Vipingo. Any surplus electricity is sold to Kenya Power and Lighting Company (KPLC). The power station was built to mitigate against the recurrent supply failures of KPLC, which were affecting profitability at the cement manufacturer.

== Location ==
The power station is located in the settlement of Vipingo, in Kilifi County, on a section of the 1,200 hectares (4.6 sq mi) owned by Mombasa Cement Limited. Vipingo is located approximately 44 kilometres (27 mi), north of Mombasa, the nearest large city.

== Overview ==
The wind farm consists of 12 turbines, each with rated capacity of 3 MW. The facility lies adjacent to a plant that manufactures clinker, used in the manufacture of cement, also owned by Mombasa Cement Limited. The clinker factory at Vipingo was also slated for an upgrade and expansion at a budgeted cost of US$74 million.

A 132kV switchyard gathers the power generated here for use internally and for sale of the balance. An overhead 132kV high voltage transmission line transfers the energy generated to the KPLC substation at Kaloleni, where the excess energy enters the national grid.

In 2018, the company's clinker factory in Vipingo missed work on 16 days in the year, on account of electricity blackouts imposed by KPLC, the national electricity utility distribution company. This led to the cement maker missing its production and financial targets for the year. To mitigate against the unreliable power supply, Mombasa Cement decided to build this wind farm to power its clinker factory, with the surplus power sold to KPLC.

== Construction ==
Construction of this wind farm began during the first quarter of 2019, with commercial commissioning in December 2019.

== See also ==
- List of power stations in Kenya
