= Master of Veterinary Science =

The Master of Veterinary Science (MVSC or MVSc) is a master's degree awarded for studies in the field of veterinary science. It can be awarded for research, a taught degree, or both.

== Eligibility ==
Bachelor of Veterinary Science or equivalent degree. Applicants should have qualifications allowing them to practice as a veterinarian.

== Coursework ==
The MVSc generally takes two years to complete with specialization in different areas of animal sciences including anatomy, physiology, biochemistry, animal nutrition, livestock production and management, livestock products technology, microbiology, virology, and animal breeding and genetics, veterinary medicine, veterinary surgery, gynaecology and obstetrics. Masters programmes in the field of pathology and parasitology are offered by some colleges and universities. The degree work may include internships or other practice requirements.

== Outlook ==
It is reported that the veterinary field in general is becoming more female, and the number of women entering in Veterinary Medicine in Trakia University is at 66%. The degree is in great demand due to an increasing need for animal experts to ensure economic demands and to tackle zoonoses. MVSc postgraduates have great demand in government veterinary services (As Livestock Development Officer or Veterinary Assistant surgeon or Veterinary Officer) as well as in research, private practice and the development sector.

The degree also defines eligibility for research as senior research fellows and lectureship.
