= Benson Mbai Itwiku =

Kenyan politician

Benson Mbai Itwiku is a Kenyan politician. He belongs to the Orange Democratic Movement-Kenya and has represented the Masinga Constituency in the National Assembly of Kenya since the 2007 Kenyan general election.
