= Matungulu Constituency =

Electoral constituency in Kenya

Matungulu
- constituency for the Parliament of Kenya
- Matungulu Constituency within Machakos County

- Machakos County within Kenya
- County: Machakos
- Population: 161,557
- Area: 581 km^{2} (224.3 sq mi)

Current constituency
- Number of members: 1
- Party: Wiper
- Member of Parliament: Stephen Mutinda Mule
- Wards: 5

Matungulu Constituency is an electoral constituency within Machakos County, Kenya. It is one of eight constituencies in the county. It was created by Independent Electoral and Boundaries Commission (IEBC). It is home to Old Donyo Sabuk National park.

== 2013 election ==
Elections	MP	Party	Notes
2013	Stephen Mutinda Mule	Wiper Democratic Movement- Kenya	

The constituency was first represented in Parliament in March 2013 By Hon Stephen Mutinda Mule. A petition was filed in Machakos law courts where his election was nullified. Matungulu Constituents then went to by-elections on October 17, 2013 and Mule of Wiper Democratic Movement- Kenya was re-elected where he garnered 11,867 votes marking a 43.83 percent of the total vote cast.

Thomas Musau of the New Democrats Party was second with 8,951 votes (33.7%). Former Kangundo MP Moffat Maitha of National Rainbow Coalition was third with 5,965 votes (22.46%).

== 2022 elections ==
The incumbent Hon. Stephen Mutinda Mule is facing a stiff competition from Peter Kilonzo Mutiso (WasyaWaMatungulu) from Nguluni, Matungulu West Ward. KILONZO is believed to be accepted across all ages.

== County assembly wards ==
Name	Population (2009 national Census)	Area (km^{2})	Description	
Tala	26,297	34.10	Sengani, Kyaume and Katine Sub–Locations of Machakos County	
Matungulu North	25,041	168.40	Uamani, Kiboko, Kayata, Kyanzavi and Kwakumbu Sub–Locations of Machakos County	
Matungulu East	21,725	40	Katheka, Matheini, Kingoti, Kambusu and Mwatati Sub–Locations of Machakos County .	
Matungulu West	33,935	246.90	Komarock, Kithuani, Nguluni, Kwangii, Kithimani, Kalandini, Matuu, Mukengesya, and Mbuni Sub–Locations of Machakos County	........................
Kyeleni	17,738	87	Kyeleni, Kwosau, Kwale, Nzambani and Kituluni Sub–Locations of Machakos County	

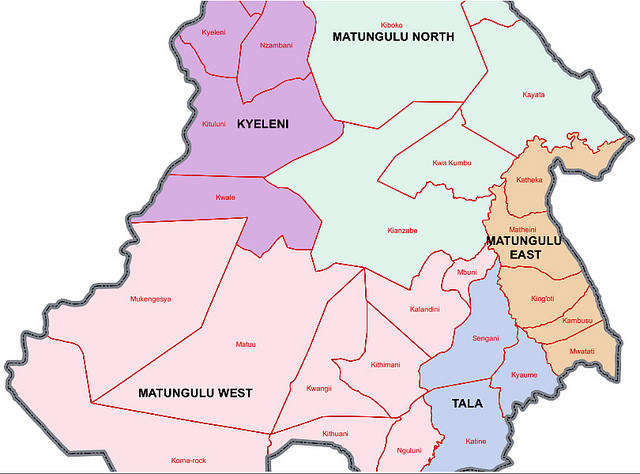
Map of Matungulu Constituency
