= George Magoha =

Kenyan urologist (1952–2023)

George Magoha MBS, EBS, CBS
- Born: George Albert Omore Magoha; 2 July 1952; Kisumu, Kenya Colony
- Died: 24 January 2023 (aged 70); Nairobi, Kenya
- Education: University of Lagos; Lagos University Teaching Hospital; University College Hospital, Ibadan; Royal College of Surgeons; Royal Postgraduate Medical School
- Occupations: Urologist, Surgeon, Physician, Academician, Administrator, and a Technocrat.
- Years active: 1990–2022
- Title: Cabinet Secretary of Education in the Cabinet of Kenya

George Albert Omore Magoha (2 July 1952 – 24 January 2023) was a Kenyan consultant surgeon, academic administrator and technocrat, who served as a Professor of Surgery at Maseno University's School of Medicine, in Kisumu County as from 17 January 2023 till his death.

Immediately before his last assignment, he was the Cabinet Secretary of Education in the Cabinet of Kenya, under President Uhuru Kenyatta's second term effective 26 March 2019.

Magoha was the chairman of the Kenya National Examinations Council (KNEC), from 2016 until 2019.

Magoha previously served as the Vice Chancellor of the University of Nairobi from 2005 until 2015. He was a Professor of Surgery at the University of Nairobi's College of Health Sciences. He concurrently served as a Consultant Urologist at Kenyatta National Hospital, the teaching hospital of the university.

== Early life and education ==
Magoha was born in Kisumu on 2 July 1952. He moved in with his older brother, John Obare and his wife Agatha Christine Obare, in Nairobi, on account of his [Magoha] asthma, at a young age.

Magoha attended Dr David Livingstone Primary School, in Nairobi. He then attended Starehe Boys' Centre and School, where he completed his O-Level studies. He proceeded to Strathmore School, for his A-Level education, graduating with a High School Diploma.

Magoha was awarded a scholarship to study human medicine at the University of Lagos, in Nigeria. His studies took him through the Lagos University Teaching Hospital, the University College Hospital, Ibadan, both in Nigeria and the Royal College of Surgeons in Ireland, Royal Postgraduate Medical School, Hammersmith Hospital in London, United Kingdom. He was trained as a urologist and was a Fellow of the Royal College of Surgeons in Ireland.

== Career ==
Magoha established his career in surgery at the Lagos University Teaching Hospital as an intern and rose to the position of Senior Resident and Clinical Lecturer in Surgery.

He also served as a lecturer in the same hospital and a Consultant Surgeon in various leading hospitals in Lagos, Nigeria.

He joined the University of Nairobi as a lecturer in Urological Surgery in 1988 and rose through the ranks to become a full Professor of Surgery in 2000.

He served in various administrative positions at the university, rising from chairperson of the Academic Department of Surgery in 1999, Dean of the School of Medicine, Principal of the College of Health Sciences, Deputy Vice-Chancellor in charge of Administration and Finance to Vice-Chancellor in January 2005 after a competitive recruitment process.

He is published in more than 60 peer-reviewed publications and supervised to completion more than 40 Master of Medicine (Surgery) students.

He is a member of many professional bodies in Urology and Surgery including British Association of Urological Surgeons (BAUS), Société Internationale d’Urologie (SIU), among others.

He was actively involved in research in male erectile dysfunction, prostate, testicular and penile cancers, circumcision and HIV/AIDs.

His most remarkable achievement at the UoN were instituting discipline among the academic staff, non-teaching staff and the students, and revamping the management of the university by achieving performance targets he was given prior to being appointed. At the time he assumed office, apparently staff members never worked, lecturers missed classes and some even lost student examination marks. Student strikes were notoriously common and had damaged the institution's reputation.

By meeting openly with students to discuss their issues, he created a safety valve for ventilation and preventing them from rioting. For the 10 years he served as the vice chancellor, the students went on strike fewer times than before his time in office.

In 2016, with his record as a no-nonsense education administrator, he was appointed the Chairman of the Kenya National Examination Council, by President Uhuru Kenyatta. His immediate task as the Chairman of KNEC was to reform the council to arrest the widespread academic dishonesty and corruption in the administration of national examinations. He is credited to have dismantled cartels that had propagated exam cheating for years and restored credibility of exams in Kenya.

On 1 March 2019, he was nominated as the Cabinet Secretary for Education in the Kenyan Cabinet, and was sworn in on 26 March 2019, replacing Amina Mohamed, who was transferred to the Sports docket.

George Magoha joined Maseno University in Kisumu County as a professor of surgery to the School of Medicine on 17 January 2023 and was due to start his new role.

== Death ==
Magoha died following a suspected cardiac arrest at the Nairobi Hospital, on 24 January 2023, aged 70. He had collapsed at home before being rushed to the hospital where he later succumbed after efforts to resuscitate him were futile.

Magoha was known to be tough-talking and no-nonsense during his tenure at the Ministry of Education, where he served at the helm as a Cabinet Secretary.

== Achievements ==
Magoha was the author of a book, Tower of Transformational Leadership, published by Kenway Publications in 2017. It is an autobiographical account of his experience as a leader in various roles in medicine, surgery, academia and the community. As of May 2017, he was the chairman of the Kenya Medical Practitioners and Dentists Board.

Magoha is also celebrated for playing a key role in transforming the education sector both as a lecturer at the University of Nairobi and during his tenure at the Ministry of Education.

In his 12 year tenure at the University of the Nairobi, he served as the Chairman of the Academic Department of Surgery, Dean of the School of Medicine and Principal of the College of Health Sciences.

UoN Vice Chancellor – 2005. During his tenure he helped enhance accountability at the finance department as and the quality teaching and discipline among the students.

Chair the Kenya National Examination Council (KNEC) – 2016.

== Succession table as Vice-Chancellor of the University of Nairobi ==
Preceded by Crispus Makau Kiamba; 2002 – 2005	Vice Chancellor of the University of Nairobi; 2005 – 2015	Succeeded by Peter Mbithi; 2015 – 2019

== See also ==
- List of universities in Kenya
- List of medical schools in Kenya
