= Deputy Governor of Machakos =

Deputy Governor of Machakos County

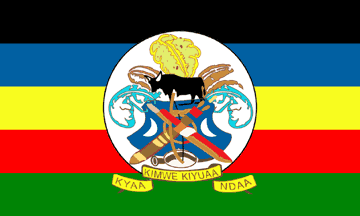
- Flag of the County of Machakos
- Incumbent; Eng. Francis Maliti since 17 August 2017
- Style: His Excellency
- Term length: 5 years, two term limit
- Inaugural holder: Bernard Kiala; 27 March 2013
- Formation: Constitution of Kenya 2010
- Succession: First

The Deputy Governor of Machakos County is a constitutional office in the executive branch of the Government of Machakos County, Kenya. It is the second highest-ranking official in County government. The Deputy Governor is elected on a ticket with the Governor for a five-year term. Official duties dictated to the Deputy Governor under the present Constitution of Kenya 2010 are to serve as Principal Deputy to the Governor of Machakos, serve as Acting Governor in the absence of the Governor from the County or the disability of the Governor, or to become Governor in the event of the Governor's death, resignation or removal from office via impeachment.

The office is currently held by Francis Maliti.

Deputy Governors take on other duties as assigned to them by the Governor. There have been two Deputy Governors since its formation in 2013.

Deputy Governor Bernard Kiala was impeached by Machakos County Assembly but Senate voted to overturn the decision reinstating him.
