= Matuu, Kenya =

Municipality in Kenya

Coordinates: 1°09′S 37°33′E

Matuu is growing municipality located in Machakos County, Yatta constituency. It is midway between Nairobi/ Kitui en route to Garissa.
