= Robert Mbui =

Kenyan politician

Robert Mbui CBS

Member of the National Assembly of Kenya
- Incumbent
- Assumed office 2013
- Constituency: Kathiani Constituency

Deputy Leader of Minority in the National Assembly

Personal details
- Born: Kenya
- Party: Wiper Democratic Movement
- Spouse: Janet Mbui
- Relatives: Jackson Mulinge (grandfather)
- Education: Master's in Strategic Management
- Alma mater: Kenya Institute of Management
- Occupation: Politician, businessman
- Known for: Founder of Mutungoni Academy
- Awards: Chief of the Order of the Burning Spear (CBS)

Robert Mbui, CBS is a Kenyan politician. He is currently a member of the National Assembly representing Kathiani Constituency and Deputy Leader of Minority in the National Assembly. He is the fifth member of parliament to represent the constituency since its inception in 1988. He holds a Master's in Strategic Management from the Kenya Institute of Management.

Mbui was first elected to Parliament in 2013. Prior to this he had served as the CDF chairman for the larger Kathiani constituency before Mavoko constituency was carved out of it from 2008 to 2011. During his tenure as CDF chair, he initiated many projects to improve the education and health sector. Under his stewardship the constituency fund was voted the best used in the country. His track record and social skills propelled him to the National Assembly where he is currently serving his second term. During the 2017 elections he was one of the best performers countrywide, garnering 40,000 votes against his closest rival's 1,000 votes.

Mbui belongs to the Wiper Democratic Movement and is currently the party's national organizing secretary. On Jamhuri Day 2022 he was awarded the Chief of Burning Spear by President William Ruto.

Aside from politics Mbui has various investments, most notably in the education sector. He is the founder and owner of the Mutungoni Academy in Athi-River.

== Personal life ==
Mbui is a grandson to the late Army chief, General Jackson Mulinge.

Mbui is married to Mrs. Janet Mbui, the Director of the Mutungoni Academy School in Athi River.
