= Masinga Constituency =

Electoral constituency of Kenya

Masinga
- constituency for the Parliament of Kenya
- Masinga Constituency within Machakos County

- Machakos County within Kenya
- County: Machakos
- Population: 148,522
- Area: 1,407 km^{2} (543.2 sq mi)

Current constituency
- Number of members: 1
- Party: Independent
- Member of Parliament: Martin Mwendwa Kioko
- Wards: 5

Masinga Constituency is an electoral constituency in Kenya. It is one of eight constituencies in Machakos County. The constituency has seven wards, all electing councillors for the Masaku county council. The constituency was established for the 1988 elections.

== Members of Parliament ==
Elections	MP	Party	Notes
1988	Simon Kitheka Kiilu	KANU	One-party system.
1992	Ronald John Kiluta	KANU	
1997	Ronald John Kiluta	KANU	
2002	Benson Itwiku Mbai	NARC	
2007	Benson Itwiku Mbai	ODM-Kenya	
2012	Benson Itwiku Mbai	Ford People	
2017	Joshua Mbithi Mwalyo	Wiper	

== Locations and wards ==
Location	Population
Ekalakala	14,336
Ikaatini	8,136
Kangonde	17,040
Kithyoko	20,207
Kivaa	20,272
Mananja	15,313
Masinga	20,156
Muthesya	16,936
Ndithini	16,126
Total	148,522
source: KPHC, 2019	

Wards
Ward	Registered Voters
Kivaa	16,689
Masinga Central	16,591
Ekalakala	10,093
Muthesya	7,958
Ndithini / Mananja	10,658
Total	61,989
iebc.or.ke, 2017	
