= East African Portland Cement Company =

Kenyan cement manufacturing company

- Type: Public; KN: PORT
- Industry: Construction
- Founded: 1933
- Founder: Blue Circle Industries
- Headquarters: Athi River, Kenya
- Key people: William Lay, chairman of the board Simon Kiprono, managing director Prof Sarone Ole Sena, director
- Products: Cement
- Revenue: ▲KES: 9.21 billion (2012/13)
- Net income: ▲KES: 2.49 billion (2012/13)
- Total assets: ▲KES: 16.13 billion (2012/13)
- Total equity: ▲KES: 7.1 billion (2012/13)
- Website: Homepage

East African Portland Cement Company (EAPCC) is a Kenyan based construction company specializing in the manufacturing and selling of cement and cement related products.

== Overview ==
EAPCC's headquarters are located in Athi River, a small town about 30 km from Nairobi, Kenya's capital city. The company has operations in Kenya and Uganda.

== History ==
East African Portland Cement Company started as a trading company importing cement mainly from England for early construction work in British East Africa (now Kenya) as an agent of Blue Circle Industries of the United Kingdom. It was given the name Portland due to the resemblance in colour of set cement to the Portland stone that was mined on the Isle of Portland in Dorset, England.

In February 1933, the company was incorporated in Kenya, with the first factory in Nairobi's Industrial Area. The company had one cement mill and used imported clinker from India for cement manufacturing. The production capacity was about 60,000 tonnes of cement at the time.

In December 1956, construction of the Athi River facility started. The factory was commissioned in 1958 and consisted of a rotary kiln, a big cement mill which significantly increased production capacity to 120,000 tonnes per annum.

Over the years, EAPCC greatly expanded its production capacity. The company can presently produce over 1.3 million tonnes of cement per annum at reduced cost, especially with the June 2014 announcement of the construction of a four megawatt power plant would run on waste gases generated by the company factory at a cost of KSh800 million. This plant would lower the annual cost of running the Athi River factory by KSh500 million.

== Subsidiaries and investments ==
The companies that comprise East Africa Portland Cement include, but are not limited, to the following:

- East African Portland Cement Limited – Athi River, Kenya - 100% shareholding - The flagship company of the group. This unit engages in the production of cement.
- East African Portland Cement Uganda Limited – Kampala, Uganda - 100% shareholding - The principal activity of the company is the sale of cement purchased from the parent company. It contributed to 1.24% of the group's revenue in the year ended 30 June 2012.

== Ownership ==
The shares of East African Portland Cement are traded on the Nairobi Securities Exchange, under the symbol PORT. The shareholding in the company's stock as at 31 July 2014 was as depicted in the table below:

East Africa Portland Cement Company stock ownership

Rank	Name of owner	Percentage ownership
1	National Social Security Fund	27.00
2	Government of Kenya	25.30
3	Cementia Holdings	14.60
4	Associated International Cement	14.60
5	Bamburi Cement	12.50
6	Others	6.00
	Total	100.00

== Boardroom wars ==
Cementia Holdings, Associated International Cement and Bamburi Cement are all direct or indirect subsidiaries of Lafarge SA, giving Lafarge 41.7% of EAPCC. The Government of Kenya claims to control NSSF's stake, giving the Government 52.3% control of the firm.

This ownership structure has led to boardroom wars on who controls the company. The government has challenged Lafarge's shareholding in EAPCC due to the fact that Lafarge owns 41.7 per cent of East African Portland Cement Company and a further 58.9 per cent of Bamburi Cement, two of the three largest producers of the building material in Kenya. The Government has accused the firm of violation of antitrust legislation. Lafarge on their part started that they are a financial investor in EAPCC and they do not exert any operational leverage on the EAPCC Board.

The Kenyan courts ruled that EAPCC does not qualify to be a government parastatal because NSSF shares do not belong to the State but to contributors. This means that the government of Kenya cannot control, hire or fire its management. The ruling also stopped attempts by the government to make Lafarge dilute its stake in EAPCC. These board room wrangles negatively impacted the EAPCC's share price and market share.

== Governance ==
East African Portland Cement Company is governed by an eight-person board of directors, with Brigadier (Rtd) Richard Mbithi serving as the chairman.
