= Crispus Makau Kiamba =

Prof Crispus Makau Kiamba (born 2 March 1954) is currently a faculty member in the Department of Real Estate and Construction Management, School of the Built Environment, College of Architecture and Engineering at the University of Nairobi. He was the founding permanent secretary in the newly created Ministry of Science and Technology, Government of Kenya where he served as a Permanent Secretary from 2006 to 2008. He served as permanent secretary in the Ministry of Higher Education, Science and Technology, government of Kenya from 2008 to 2013. He was the vice chancellor of the University of Nairobi from 2002 to 2005 and served as the chief executive officer at the Commission of Higher Education between 2005 and 2006. He also served as a member of Kenya's National Economic and Social council between 2006 and 2013.

== Education ==
Prof Kiamba is an alumnus of Mumbuni Secondary school where he studied for his Ordinary ("O") Level between 1968 and 1971. He did his Advanced ("A") Level at Machakos School between 1972 and 1973, thereafter proceeding to the University of Nairobi where he studied for B.A. in Land Economics (1974–77). He obtained the Commonwealth Academic Scholarship to study for an M.Sc. in Urban Land Appraisal at University of Reading (1978–79). In 1983, he was awarded the British Technical Co-operation Scholarship to study at the University of Cambridge where he obtained a PhD in Land Economy in 1988.

== Career ==
Prof. Kiamba joined the University of Nairobi in 1977 as a tutorial fellow in the Department of Land Development.

He became a senior lecturer in the department of Land Development in 1987, a position he held until 1995 when he was promoted to position of associate professor in the Department of Real Estate and Construction Management. From 1989 to 1991 he served as the chairman of the Department of Land Development. Prof. Kiamba served as the Dean of the Faculty of Architecture, Design and Development between 1991 and 1994. In 1994, he was appointed the Principal of the College of Architecture and Engineering, a position he held up to 1998. Between 1998 and 2002 he served as the Deputy Vice-Chancellor (Administration & Finance). In 2002, Prof Kiamba was appointed by the then president of Kenya, Daniel Toroitich arap Moi, as the Vice-Chancellor, University of Nairobi. He served as the Vice-Chancellor until 2005 and in 2006 was appointed Permanent Secretary in the Ministry of Science and Technology, a position he held up to 2008. He served as the chief executive officer of the Commission of Higher Education between 2005 and 2006. From 2008 to 2013, he served as the Permanent Secretary in the Ministry of Higher Education, Science and Technology.
