= Wavinya Ndeti =

Governor of Machakos County

Her Excellency Wavinya Ndeti
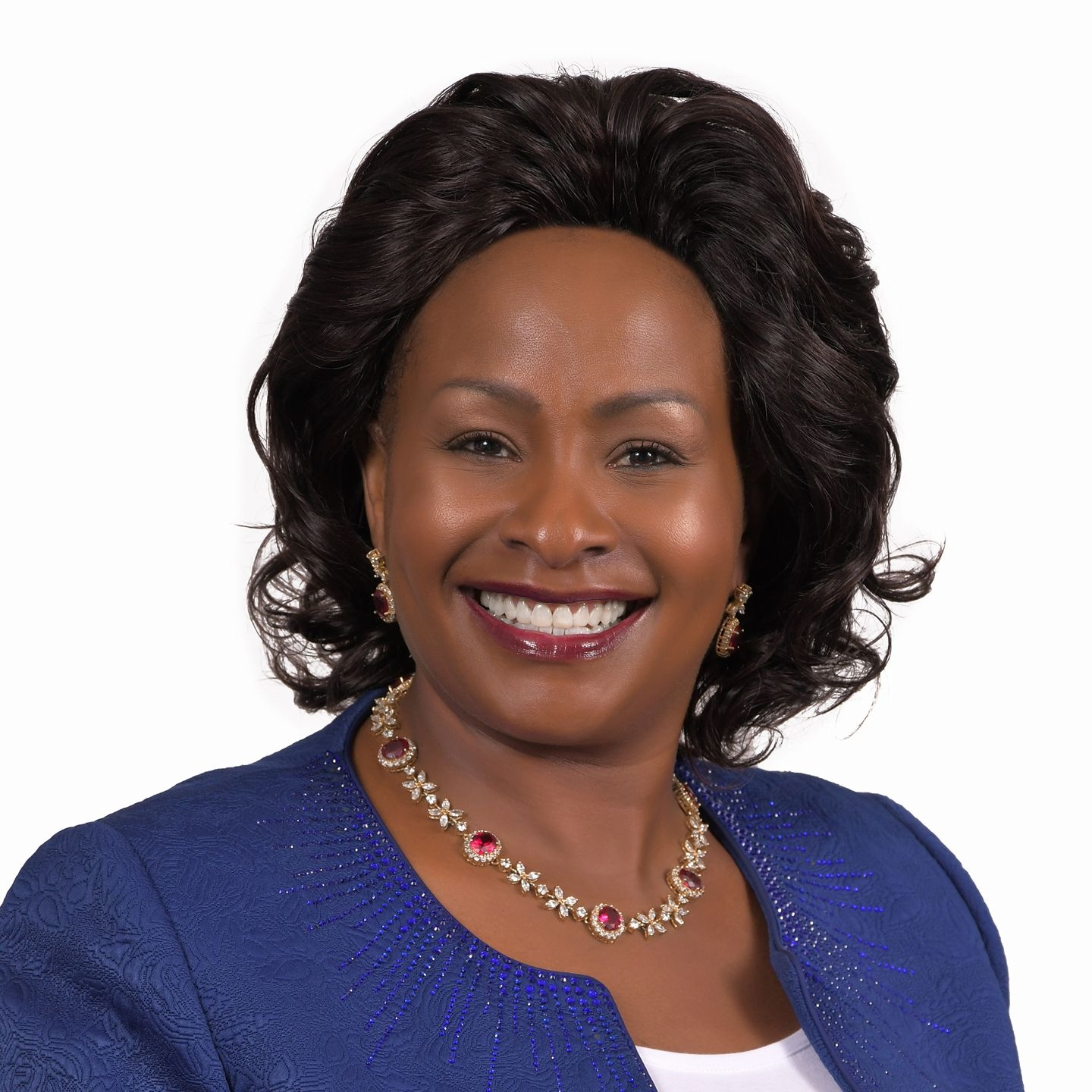

Governor of Machakos County
- Incumbent
- Assumed office 25 August 2022

Assistant Minister Youth And Sports serving with Kabando wa Kabando
- In office 3 April 2008 – 9 April 2013
- President: Mwai Kibaki
- Prime Minister: Raila Odinga
- Minister: Helen Sambili (3 April 2008 – August 2010); Paul Otuoma (August 2010 – 9 April 2013)
- Preceded by: Judah Ole Metito
- Succeeded by: Office abolished

Member of Parliament for Kathiani
- In office 29 December 2007 – 4 March 2013
- President: Mwai Kibaki
- Prime Minister: Raila Odinga
- Preceded by: Peter Kyalo Kaindi - NARC
- Succeeded by: Robert Mbui - WDM-K

Chairlady for Kenya Water Institute
- Incumbent
- Assumed office 8 February 2019
- President: Uhuru Kenyatta
- Cabinet Secretary (Water): Simon Chelugui

Personal details
- Born: 8 November 1967 (age 58) Machakos, Kenya
- Party: Chama Cha Uzalendo (2007–2017); WDM-K (2017-Present)
- Other political affiliations: Party of National Unity (Kenya) (Coalition partner) (2008–2012); Coalition for Reforms and Democracy (2012–2017); National Super Alliance (2017–present)
- Spouse: Henry Oduwale (m. 1990; died 2016)
- Children: 3
- Parent: Peter Nzuki Ndeti
- Education: South Bank University, (BSC, Graduate Diploma, Advanced Diploma in computer science)
- Website: www.wavinyandeti.com
- Nickname: Osa Vinya na Wavinya

Wavinya Ndeti EGH (born 8 November 1967) is a Kenyan politician and a business woman who is serving as the 2nd Governor of Machakos County. She previously served as a member of parliament for the Kathiani Constituency in the 10th Kenyan parliament and an assistant minister in the ministry of youth affairs and sport from 2008 to 2013. She was the first woman to be elected as a member of parliament in Machakos county since independence. She was a CCU candidate in 2013 and WDM-K candidate in 2017 for Machakos Governor.

== Education background ==
She graduated in computer science from London South Bank University, before she achieved related masters degrees from The City University London and the Scottish Heriot- Watt University.

== Political history ==
Ndeti joined politics in 2007 contesting and being elected MP for the Kathiani Constituency under Chama Cha Uzalendo. She had previously participated in the ODM-Kenya primaries, which she claimed were rigged in favor of incumbent legislator Peter Kyalo Kaindi, forcing her to switch to Chama Cha Uzalendo. She eventually won a landslide victory, garnering 28,178 votes against Kaindi's 9,813. In winning the seat, Ndeti became the only woman to have represented the constituency in Parliament since independence.

Ndeti was appointed to a grand coalition government as a Co-assistant Minister for Youth and Sports under Helen Sambili.

During the 2010 constitutional referendum she supported the new constitution, citing the importance of having a uniform distribution of resources and having decentralized leadership. Although the document was unpopular in the Machakos District, the majority of Kenyans voted in favour of the new constitution, which President Mwai Kibaki promulgated on 27 August 2010.

== 2013 and 2017 elections ==
Ndeti, one of the founding members of CORD, ran for the newly created office of Governor of Machakos on a CCU ticket in 2013. She picked former Water and Natural Resources minister Mutua Katuku as her running mate.

She lost the bid to Alfred Mutua and subsequently lost the election petition on grounds she failed to appoint enough party agents to all polling stations.

In 2017, Ndeti and Makueni governor Kivutha Kibwana pledged to rejoin Wiper Democratic Movement under a brokered agreement known as the Emali Declaration. In the declaration, Kibwana was to defend his seat on the Wiper Democratic Movement and Ndeti would be given a direct ticket to unseat Mutua.

== Wiper Democratic Movement-Kenya ==
Ndeti ditched Chama Cha Uzalendo for Wiper on the morning of 5 April 2017, in line with the law that requires candidates to change political parties within 90 days of an election. Initially, she was handed direct nomination with Peter Mathuki as running mate, but the party decided to hold primaries.

The deal had been a product of months of negotiations between the Wiper Party and Ndeti's CCU party, with Kalonzo said to have prevailed upon Mathuki and Machakos Deputy Governor Bernard Kiala to compromise their ambitions in favour of a ticket that would send Mutua home and win back the seat to the party.

Muthama, the incumbent senator, announced that he would not defend his seat in the 2017 Kenya general elections on the Wiper ticket.

This led to the WDM-K NEB awarding a direct nomination to former Machakos County Secretary for Education Jackson Kala to represent the party in the Senate election.

Ndeti was cleared to run for governor by the IEBC in early June 2017.

Ndeti on 9 June challenged the ruling at the High Court.

High Court Judge George Vincent Odunga stayed the IEBC tribunal decision. On 14 June 2017, the judge rejected a petition by the IEBC to disqualify himself. Kiala decided to run as an independent.

== Chief administrative secretary - Ministry Of Transport ==
Ndeti was appointed as chief administrative secretary for the State Department for Public Works and also State Department for Shipping and Maritime in the Ministry of Transport, Infrastructure, Housing, Urban Development and Public Works on Tuesday, 14 January 2020 by President Uhuru Kenyatta following a reshuffle and new appointments of chief administrative secretaries.

As the chief administrative secretary for public works, she is responsible in providing policy direction and coordinating all matters related to construction, rehabilitation and maintenance of public buildings and other public works. In discharging its functions, the state department is guided by detailed mandate through Executive Order No. 1/2016 notably;

- Public Works Policy and Planning.
- Public office Accommodation Lease Management.
- Maintenance of Inventory of Government Property in Liaison with the National Treasury.
- Overseeing Provision of Mechanical and Electrical (Building) Services to Public Buildings.
- Supplies branch and Co-ordination of Procurement of Common – User Items by Government ministries.
- Development and management of Government Buildings

Also, in the state Department of Shipping and Maritime, she is responsible in spearheading the following strategic objectives;

- Development and Implementation of the maritime transport Policy.
- Operationalization of the Maritime shipping Act, 2009.
- Establishment of a maritime training school of excellence.
- Establishment of a maritime accident investigation Unit.
- Establishment of a maritime fund.
- Implementation of maritime conventions.

Ndeti holds a master's degree in business systems analysis and design from The City University London, a master's in business administration from Heriot-Watt University in UK and a bachelor's degree in computer science from South Bank University UK. She has a vast experience in public sector management. Among other trainings, Ndeti has attended a conference of Africa's Great Women in decision making in the United Arab Emirates, Dubai, where she was elected the vice president to represent East Africa Region.

She joins the ministry of Transport, Infrastructure, Housing, Urban Development and Public Works from the Kenya Water Institute (KEWI the center of excellence in training, research, consultancy and outreach for the water and related sectors where she was the chair Governing Council since 7 February 2019. CAS Ndeti has also previously served as a member of parliament for the Kathiani Constituency in the 10th Kenyan parliament. She was the first and so far only woman to have represented the constituency since independence. CAS Ndeti was appointed to a grand coalition government as a Co-assistant Minister for Youth and Sports. She was a Wiper Democratic Movement -Kenya candidate for Machakos governor in 2017 where she garnered over 209,000 votes in a disputed poll which saw the incumbents election initially overturned at the Court of Appeal. The petition was ultimately decided at the Supreme Court in favor of Alfred Mutua.

== Controversy ==
=== Corruption allegations ===
Wavinya has been on the spotlight several times over corruption allegations. In September 2024, there were reports that she had been stranded in the UK over a failed deposit of millions of Kenya shillings, with some reports claiming over KES650 million, a move that allegedly had her detained over money laundering suspicions. In a statement she denied the claims, accusing those reporting it of falsity and rumors. She affirmed that she and everyone in her family both in Kenya and abroad were all safe and sound and in good standing.

== Key achievements ==
Some of Ndeti's Key achievements are:

- She was voted the Best Manager on the utilization of Community Development Funds (CDF).
- She was the pioneer of computer training in primary and secondary schools since 1998 (Computer Project For Schools In Kenya).
- Ndeti has facilitated community Development I.e. Building Churches and Schools Water Harvesting, provided power generators to rural schools as well as empowering the youth through intensive trainings.
- She has helped educate the underprivileged in the country.
- She has sponsored youth sports tournaments. (Machakos County Women League, Wavinya Ndeti Football Youth Tournament which has been ongoing since 2006).
- Ndeti was pioneer and sole distributor of Meccer computers from South Africa in Kenya.
- September 2008 and August 2012, Ndeti led the Kenya Paralympics team to Beijing, China and United Kingdom respectively.
- She was the acting assistant minister for youth and sports.
- In 2009, Ndeti represented Kenya in New York on the role of Parliaments in promoting equal sharing of responsibilities between women and men.
- In 2010, Ndeti attended One Hope Global Advisory Meeting with leaders of the southern-Africa and Eastern-African countries.
- She also attended a conference on Africa's Great Women in Decision making in the United Arab Emirates, Dubai.
- She was elected the vice president to represent East Africa Region.
- Ndeti has also overseen the commissioning of over twenty youth polytechnics throughout the county.
- She has also attended the 55th Session of the Commission on the status of Women in New York, USA. A platform that inspired her to stand for Human rights and women rights and opportunities.
- On Friday 10 March 2017 - Kenya Human Rights Commission, Ndeti was part of The National Women Steering Committee and CREAW that launched the Ni Mama wangu. Movement. This was the largest convention of women political leaders ever held in Kenya. The convention brought together over 3,500 women leaders from all over Kenya and from different political parties to make a declaration on Women Leadership and to claim power. The women vowed to stand together and vote for women regardless of party affiliations. The women presented a policy document that set part of their demands for the government. Key among this demands was the need to have 50-50 gender representation in all party positions.
