= Kangundo =

Town in Machakos County, Kenya

Kangundo is a town in Machakos County, Kenya. Kangundo is part of the extensive 4 county metropolitan area of Nairobi. It is classified as a twin town to neighboring Tala due to their close proximity.

== Kangundo-Tala ==
Officially Kangundo-Tala's population is the 9th largest urban area in Kenya. Kangundo-Tala is also part of the Eastern Nairobi Metropolitan Area. Tala is part of Kangundo town council.

== Towns in Machakos County ==
Town	Population (2009)	Rank in Kenya (Population Size)
Kangundo-Tala	218,557	9
Machakos	150,041	13
Athi River	139,380	15
Kathiani	3,365	195
Masii	2,501	211

* 2009 census. Source:

== Nairobi Metro ==
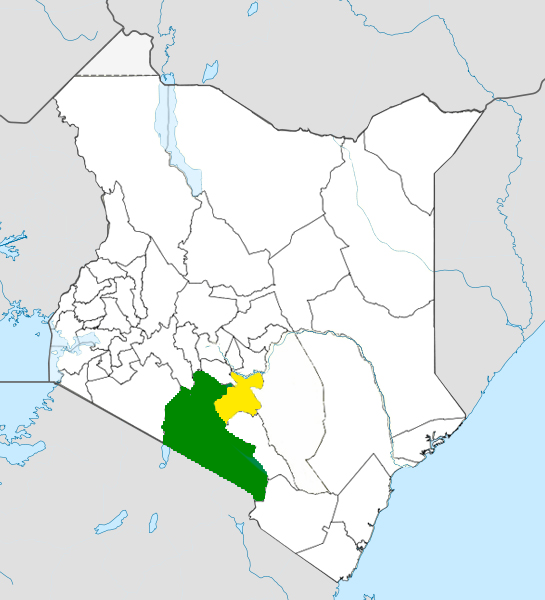
Machakos County (yellow) within Nairobi Metro (green)

Machakos County is within Greater Nairobi which consists of 4 out of 47 counties in Kenya but the area generates about 60% of the nation's wealth. The counties are:

Area	County	Area (km^{2})	Population Census 2009	Cities/Towns/Municipalities in the Counties
Core Nairobi	Nairobi County	694.9	3,138,369	Nairobi
Northern Metro	Kiambu County	2,449.2	1,623,282	Kiambu, Thika, Limuru, Ruiru, Karuri, Kikuyu
Southern Metro	Kajiado County	21,292.7	687,312	Kajiado, Olkejuado, Bissil, Ngong, Kitengela, Kiserian, Ongata Rongai
Eastern Metro	Machakos County	5,952.9	1,098,584	Kangundo-Tala, Machakos, Athi River
Totals	Nairobi Metro	30,389.7	6,547,547	

Source: NairobiMetro/ Kenya Census

== See also ==
- Tala
- Machakos County
