= Machakos District =

Former district of Kenya

Machakos District was an administrative district in the Eastern Province of Kenya. Its capital was Machakos. The district had an area of 20,402 km^{2}.

Machakos District, then known as Athi District, was created in 1895 as one of the original districts of Ukamba Province among, the Kikuyu, Taita and Kitui districts. They were part of the administrative structure of the Imperial British East Africa Company, later the East Africa Protectorate, which became British Kenya. The district's name was later changed to Ulu then Machakos in 1920. The district remained as part of Ukamba Province until 1933, in Central Province until 1953, Southern Province until 1962, and Eastern Province after 1963.

In 1992, Machakos District's southern half was hived off to create Makueni District. By the 2000s, Machakos District had three more districts created from it; Mwala, Kagundo and Yatta, all had a population of 1,098,534.

In 2010, after the promulgation of the new constitution of Kenya, counties were to be created based on the districts of Kenya that existed prior to 1992. This effectively led to the creation of Machakos County.
