= Bachelor of Veterinary Science =

Academic degree

The Bachelor of Veterinary Science (BVSc or BVSC; Latin Baccalaureus Veterinariae Scientiae), "Bachelor of Veterinary Medicine" (BVetMed), or "Bachelor of Veterinary Medicine and Surgery" ("BVM&S" or "BVMS") is a degree for studies in veterinary medicine in the United Kingdom, Australia, and several other countries outside the United States and Canada. These degrees qualify one to practice as a veterinarian in the US if the degree is conferred from an American Veterinary Medical Association (AVMA) accredited school and the candidate passes the North American Veterinary Licensing Examination (NAVLE), just as any other US and Canada graduate. They are equivalent to DVM/VMD degrees; the main equalizer being licensure in the US. On 5 March 2015, the Royal College of Veterinary Surgeons (RCVS) Council made the decision to allow UK veterinarians to use the courtesy title "doctor", to align with international practices. The RCVS president said of the change: “Whether one regards the decision as correcting a historical anomaly or simply providing greater clarity at home and abroad, there is no doubt that the issue has generated huge interest".

It is generally a 5-year course, or sometimes 4 if a previous appropriate degree is held. (Cambridge Veterinary School's course lasts 6 years and awards a BA after 3 years, followed by the VetMB after 6 years). Some universities will award the students a BSc after the first 3 years, and the BVSc after the final 2 years.

The degree is generally required for becoming a veterinarian in the countries where it is awarded.

== Veterinary medicine in the UK ==
In the United Kingdom, there are currently ten institutions where Veterinary medicine can be studied:

- University of Bristol
- University of Cambridge
- University of Central Lancashire
- University of Edinburgh
- University of Glasgow
- Harper & Keele Veterinary School
- University of Liverpool
- Royal Veterinary College (RVC), part of the University of London
- University of Nottingham
- University of Surrey

The University of Nottingham started to run the course in 2006 and the graduates of 2011 are the first to have received the MRCVS acknowledgement required for employment as a vet from that institution. The University of Surrey received MRCVS acknowledgement in 2020, six months after its first 2014 cohort graduated having sat RCVS recognised exams at that time. Degrees from Harper & Keele Veterinary School and the University of Central Lancashire are yet to receive RCVS accreditation.

=== Degree titles ===
Although institution choice in this specialised bachelor's degree makes no difference in becoming a practising Vet, most of the universities have unique titles:

- Bristol - Bachelor of Veterinary Science BVSc
- Cambridge - Bachelor of Arts, Bachelor of Veterinary Medicine BA VetMB
- Edinburgh - Bachelor of Veterinary Medicine and Surgery BVM&S
- Glasgow - Bachelor of Veterinary Medicine and Surgery BVMS
- Liverpool - Bachelor of Veterinary Science BVSc
- Nottingham - Bachelor of Veterinary Medicine, Bachelor of Veterinary Surgery with integrated Bachelor of Veterinary Medical Sciences BVM BVS BVMedSci
- RVC - Bachelor of Veterinary Medicine BVetMed
- Surrey - Bachelor of Veterinary Medicine and Science BVMSci
- UCLan - Bachelor of Veterinary Medicine and Surgery BVMS
