= Machakos County Assembly =

- Devolved Legislature

Type
- Houses: 1
- Term limits: No term limits

History
- Preceded by: Various County councils

Leadership
- Speaker: Florence Mwangangi, WDM-K since 7 September 2017
- Deputy Speaker: Paul Museku, Independent since 7 September 2017
- Majority Leader: Mark Muendo, WDM-K since 7 September 2017
- Minority Leader: Alex Kamitu, Maendeleo Chap Chap

Structure
- Seats: 57
- Political groups: Party constitution WDM-K (32); CCU (6); Jubilee (1); Other Parties (18)

Elections
- Voting system: First-past-the-post
- Last election: 8 August 2017

Motto
- kyaa kimwe kiyuaa ndaa

Meeting place
- Machakos County Assembly, Machakos, Kenya

Website
- Official website

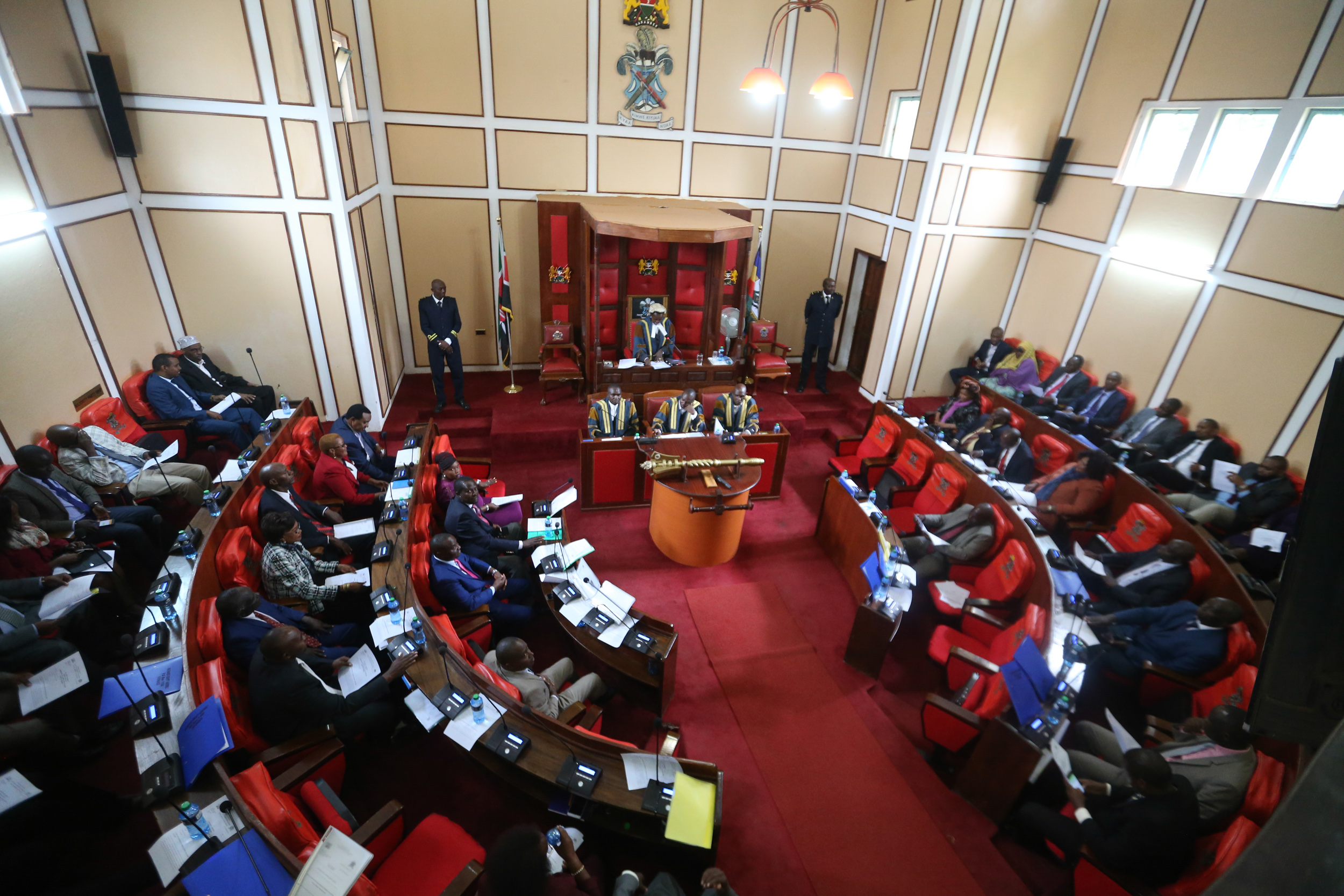
The Machakos County Assembly

A Machakos County Assembly is the forum through which the people of Machakos participate in the making of laws, formulation of policies for taxation, budgeting, and the establishment of the Machakos County public service.

Through the same forum, the people maintain surveillance and oversight on how they are governed; while the Machakos County Executive gives an account of its operations in governing the Machakos County.

== Composition of a County Assembly ==
Membership of Machakos County Assembly is constituted according to provisions in Section 177 (a), (b), (c) and (d) of the Constitution of Kenya 2010; and Section 7 (1) and (2) of the County Governments Act, 2012.

== Election and nomination of members of a County Assembly ==
A Machakos County Assembly is composed of both elected and nominated Members. The process for the election and nomination, including how the stakeholders participate are set out in the 2010 Constitution of Kenya and statutes – County Governments Act, 2012, Political Parties Act, 2010 and Independent Electoral and Boundaries Commission Act, 2011.

=== Membership of Machakos County Assembly ===
Machakos County Assembly consists of-

a)Members elected by the registered voters of the Wards, each Ward constituting a single member Constituency, on the same day as a general election of Members of Parliament, being the second Tuesday in August, in every fifth year.

b)The number of Special Seat Members necessary to ensure that no more than two-thirds of the Membership of the Assembly are of the same gender

c)The number of Members of Marginalised Groups, including Persons with Disabilities and the Youth, prescribed by an Act of Parliament; and

d)The Speaker, who is an ex officio member

The Members contemplated in clause (b) and (c) above shall, in each case, be nominated by Political Parties in proportion to the seats received in that, election in that county by each Political Party under paragraph (a) in accordance with Article 90.

The filling of Special Seats under clause (b) shall be determined after declaration of elected Members from each Ward.

Machakos County Assembly is elected for a term of five years.

== Mandate, Role And Function of a County Assembly ==
Machakos County Assembly exercises and executes the mandate, role and function by the sovereign power to participate in governance, delegated to them under Section 1 (2), (3) and (4) of Constitution of Kenya 2010.

On the basis of the current philosophies and practices of governance and from Constitution of Kenya 2010 and pertinent statutes, the mandate, role and function of the County Assemblies in Kenya are:

i)They are the home of and executer of the legislative authority of a County by making and unmaking laws to facilitate the due execution of the powers and functions of a County Government under existing statute

ii)They exercise oversight over all issues and matters of governance, especially, the operation of the County Executive Committee and all organs of the County Executive

iii)They receive, deliberate on and approve:-

(a) All development plans, programmes, policies and budget of a County Government; as set out in Sections 207, 220 (2), 201 and 203 of CK 2010 and Part !V of the Public Finance Management Act, 2012

(b) Vetting all nominees for appointment as County Secretary and Chief Officers of the County Public Service

(c)The borrowing by a County Government in accordance with provisions of Section 212 of Constitution of Kenya 2010

(d)Appointment of a Clerk of a County Assembly (CCA) on recommendation of the County Assembly Service Board (CASB).

iv)They represent the electorate of a County in the governance, including providing leadership in deliberation on all matters of concern and interest

v)However, Members of a County Assembly, do not get directly involved in the Executive or functions of a County Government or in the delivery of services meant to be done by the County Public Service

If a County Assembly fails to enact any – particular legislation required to give further effect to any provision of this Act, corresponding national legislation, if any shall with necessary modification apply to the matters in question until the County Assembly enacts required legislation.

== Speaker of the County Assembly of Machakos ==
Speaker of the Machakos County Assembly
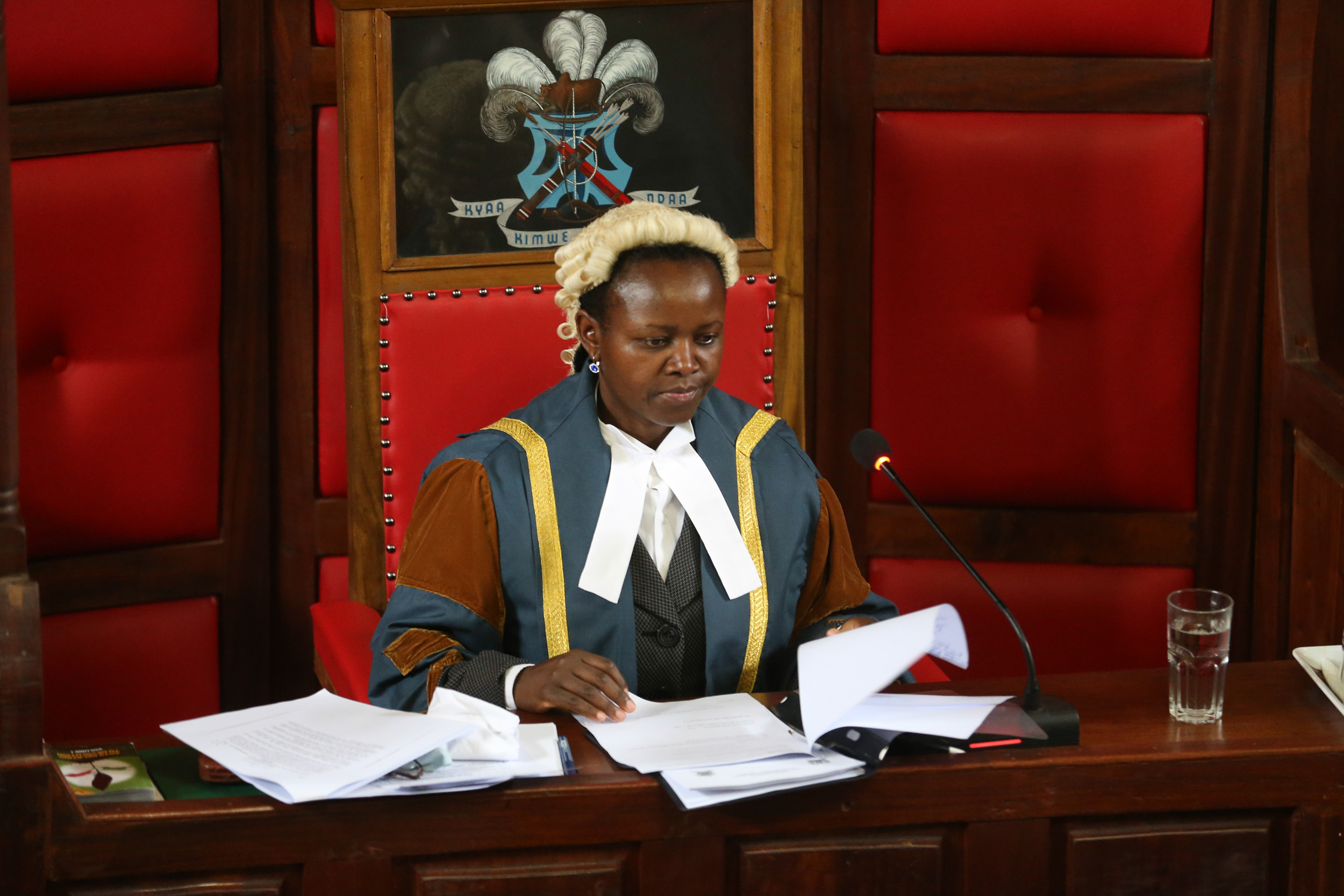
- Incumbent; Hon. Florence Muoki Mwangangi since 8 September 2017
- Style: The Honorable (diplomatic); Madam Speaker (within the assembly)
- Inaugural holder: Bernard Mung'ata; 26 March 2013
- Formation: Kenya Constitution 2010
- Website: http://machakosassembly.com/

Speaker of Machakos County Assembly an ex-officio member of Machakos County Assembly in Kenya. The Current speaker of Machakos Assembly is Hon. Florence Mwangangi.

The inaugural holder of the office was Bernard Mung'ata who was elected into office on 26 March 2013
