= Chama Cha Uzalendo =

Kenyan political party

Patriotic Party Chama Cha Uzalendo (Swahili)
- Chairman: Maur Bwanamaka
- Secretary-General: Phillipe Sadja
- Founded: 2004
- Youth wing: Uzalendo Youth Forum

Website
- Official website (archive)

The Chama Cha Uzalendo (lit. 'Patriotic Party', CCU) is a Kenyan political party established in 2004. The party is currently headed by Maur Bwanamaka. Former party chairmen include Wavinya Ndeti and Koigi Wamwere.

== 2007 general election ==
Wavinya Ndeti was elected to Parliament as the first woman to ever represent the Kathiani constituency. Gitobu Imanyara was elected to represent the Central Imenti constituency.

== 2017 general election ==
Ahead of the 2017 election, CCU joined the Coalition for Reforms and Democracy (CORD) in July 2016; in 2017, most CORD members transitioned into the National Super Alliance coalition. David Mwalika Mboni was elected to represent Kitui County, the sole CCU member to have a seat in the National Assembly.

== 2021 Machakos Senate race ==
After CCU senator Boniface Kabaka's death in December 2020, the Senate seat for Machakos County became available. CCU candidate Lily Nduku Mwanzia withdrew from the race due to financial constraints.
