= Alfred Mutua =

Kenyan politician

Alfred Nganga Mutua
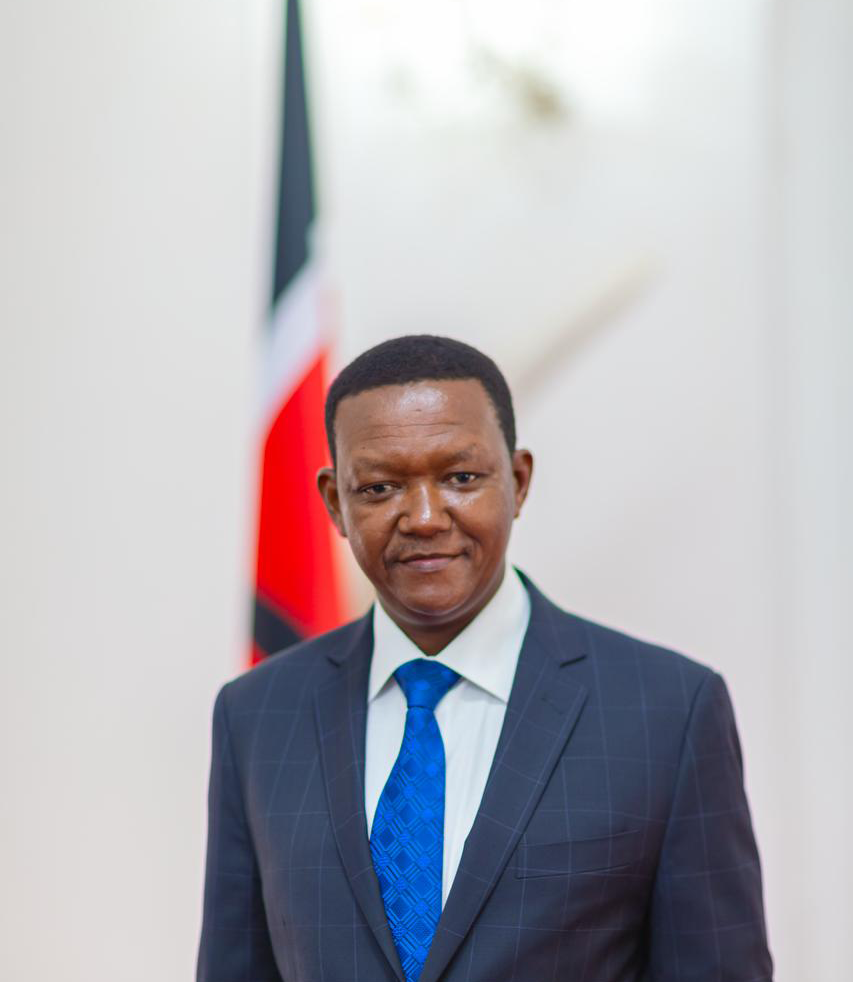

Minister of Labour and Social Protection
- Incumbent
- Assumed office 8 August 2024
- President: William Ruto
- Preceded by: Florence Bore

Governor of Machakos
- In office 27 March 2013 – 25 August 2022
- Deputy: Francis Maliti

Minister of Foreign & Diaspora Affairs
- In office 27 October 2022 – 5 October 2023
- Succeeded by: Musalia Mudavadi

Government Spokesman
- In office June 2003 – December 2012

Personal details
- Born: 22 August 1970 (age 56) Machakos, Kenya
- Party: Maendeleo Chap Chap
- Spouse: Josephine Thitu (m. 2000–2015)
- Education: Whitworth College (BA); Eastern Washington University (MSc); University of Western Sydney (PhD)

Alfred Nganga Mutua (born 22 August 1970) is a Kenyan journalist and politician who is serving as the Kenyan Minister (Cabinet Secretary) for Labour and Social Protection, an appointment he received as part of the July/August 2024 cabinet reshuffle. He previously served as the Minister for Tourism and Wildlife. Before that he served as the Cabinet Secretary (Minister) for Foreign and Diaspora Affairs under President William Ruto. Mutua was, together with the entire Cabinet members, dismissed from the cabinet in July, 2024 as President William Ruto planned to reorganize his Government. He was one of only 10 of the dismissed members of Cabinet who were reappointed back into Cabinet. Twelve of the dismissed Cabinet members were not reappointed.

Before joining the government, Mutua served as the 1st Governor of Machakos County for two terms, from 2013 to 2017 and from 2018 to 2022. He was Kenya's first Government Spokesman from June, 2004, during the Presidency of Mwai Kibaki, before resigning in 2012 to run for the Machakos County Gubernatorial seat. He is the founder of the Maendeleo Chap Chap Party (MCC) which was established on 25 August 2016.

== Early life and education ==
Mutua was born in Masii, Machakos County. He has lived, studied and worked in Kenya, the United States, Australia, and the United Arab Emirates, and has been a journalist, businessman, lecturer, civil servant, and politician.

He was educated at Dagoretti High School (O level) and at Jamhuri High School (A level). He obtained his Bachelor of Arts in journalism from Whitworth College and his Master of Science in communication from Eastern Washington University. He received his doctorate in communication and media from the University of Western Sydney in Australia.

== Professional career ==
=== Journalism ===
Mutua began his career as a journalist while still in high school, publishing his first story in the daily newspapers at the age of 15. After high school, he wrote features for The Sunday Nation, The Standard newspaper, and the defunct Kenya Times Newspaper. In 1989, at the age of 19, he registered his first company Golden Dreams Company and started publishing a newsletter/magazine called Golden Times.

While in the United States for further education, he published stories for several American newspapers and started video production work, producing "An African in America" documentary in 1996. He worked for several TV stations including PBS in Seattle, Washington. He later worked for Nation Media Group as a reporter and features writer from 1997.

Later in Australia, Mutua's works were published by The Sydney Morning Herald and worked as a foreign correspondent for SBS TV's international magazine show Dateline.

He also lectured at the University of Western Sydney, Macquarie University, and several TAFE colleges in Sydney. In 2002, he was poached from Sydney and moved to The United Arab Emirates as an assistant professor of Communication and Media at Zayed University. While in the UAE – Dubai and Abu Dhabi, he undertook research in the Middle East and travelled to Oman and Beirut, Lebanon to present papers and research on the use of media and communication for peace and development.

Starting in 1999, he wrote a popular weekly travel feature called "Msafiri" for the Friday edition of the Daily Nation Newspaper and became a contributor of opinion pieces for the Sunday Nation. In 2003, Mutua undertook consultancy work at the then Nation TV, training and assisting journalists transition to modern broadcasting standards as the station changed its name and look to NTV.

=== Media, film work, books and magazines ===
While in Dubai, Mutua continued producing films and, in 2002, he made "And the Desert Smiled," a film about always hoping and winning. Later on, in 2005, he revived his company Golden Dreams Company and made Kenya's first modern action TV series, "Cobra Squad," which gained a huge following in the region. He also produced other shows including "Beba Beba" and "How to be Rich in Africa".

He published a fashion magazine called "PASSION" and wrote a book titled "How to be Rich in Africa and Other Secrets of Survival" among many other ventures that included the East African Music Awards in 2011.

He is also the Proprietor of Woni TV station and has diverse interests in the Hotel Industry, Aviation, and Real Estate.

== Civil servant ==
=== Government spokesperson and public communications secretary ===
Mutua was appointed the first official government spokesperson of Kenya in June 2003 by the then President Mwai Kibaki and served in that capacity until 3 September 2012. He was also the public communications secretary and head of the Office of Public Communications in the Office of the President. He was charged with the duty of collecting information and analyzing events within the set-up of the government. Essentially, his work entailed communicating information to and from media, government ministries, state corporations and the public on behalf of his employer, the State. Under his stewardship in this office, Mutua established a public campaign initiative to promote Kenya's identity, image, culture, and pride among Kenyans and to encourage them to appreciate the positive attributes of their country. The campaign was dubbed "Najivunia Kuwa Mkenya".

He is also remembered for running a Nairobi beautification program which included beautifying Uhuru Highway, repainting zebra crossings, installation of street CCTVs and most notably setting up a building address system in Nairobi CBD.

Mutua was also mandated with a couple of presidential tasks, among the notable ones was to chair a task force in charge of the candidacy of Mombasa to host the 2007 World Championships in Athletics.

Mutua served at a time when the country was undergoing major conflicts and scandals and he managed to raise the stature of the office by ensuring members of public and media had access to government information.

Having been dismissed as the cabinet secretary for tourism, Mutua was later nominated again by President Ruto as the cabinet secretary for Labour and Social Protection and is now awaiting vetting by the members of parliament.

== Political career ==
In March 2013, Mutua was sworn in as the first governor of Machakos County, which is one of the 47 counties established under the Constitution of Kenya. He was elected on a Wiper Democratic Movement Party ticket alongside Bernard Kiala as his deputy governor.

In August 2016, Mutua launched a political party called Maendeleo Chap Chap Party. This was a culmination of several months of speculation among the Kenyan media and general public that Mutua had abandoned Wiper Democratic Movement – the party that had sponsored him for his election as Machakos Governor in 2013. Mutua's action of launching and supporting a political party other than the one that sponsored him was considered controversial. He was expected to vacate office and seek a fresh mandate as Machakos County Governor; being sponsored by his new political party in line with Kenyan electoral laws. When Mutua did not vacate office to seek fresh re-election, Wiper Democratic Movement Party's disciplinary committee found him culpable of launching and supporting another political party. The disciplinary committee deemed him to have resigned from the party.

In November 2016, a notice to impeach Mutua was filed in the Machakos County Assembly by a member Mr. Stephen Muthuka. This was after the motion notice was signed by 46 out of 59 Machakos county assembly members – meeting the two-thirds threshold for an impeachment motion to progress. Included among the reasons for the impeachment motion was alleged breach of the Kenyan constitution, procurement laws and devolution laws.

Several days before Mutua's impeachment motion at the Machakos County Assembly, over half of the assembly's 59 members travelled out of the country in what was considered to be a tactical move for scuttling the impeachment process. In the absence of 32 members of the county assembly, the impeachment motion was debated with Mutua being represented by his lawyer. When the final vote was taken 26 out of 27 members of the assembly voted to impeach Mutua. This, however, was too few votes to legally impeach Mutua as Governor of Machakos County since the threshold of 40 members of the county assembly voting in favor of the motion was not attained.

=== 2017 gubernatorial election ===
Mutua contested the Machakos County Governor position for a second and final term in the 2017 general election against Wavinya Ndeti and his former Deputy – Bernard Kiala. Mutua was declared the winner amid claims of election rigging which resulted in a protracted election petition process that saw high court judge Aggrey Muchelule annul Mutua's election. In June 2018, The court of appeal bench comprising judges W. Ouko, M. Warsame and S. Gatembu Kairu nullified the election of Alfred Mutua. Subsequently, Alfred Mutua contested the ruling of the Court of Appeal at the Supreme Court. This legal contest was considered an epic battle at the Kenyan apex court. The Supreme Court of Kenya would later on 21 December 2018, overturn the Court of Appeal ruling to reinstate Mutua's gubernatorial election win.

=== Stewardship of public funds ===
Though Mutua's stewardship of public funds as Governor for Machakos County saw the Auditor General raise numerous queries on the propriety of public expenditure throughout his first term, it turned out that his strategy of fiscal management was one of the best in the government. For example, in 2014, he chose to purchase second hand vans and retrofitted them into ambulances which enabled him to have 120 ambulances at the cost of a few new ones. This got him into trouble with the Auditor General, but was a big win for Machakos residents who got at least one ambulance in every location.

In the years 2015, 2019 and 2020, Mutua was ranked the best-performing governor in Kenya. In 2015, a survey carried out to measure the successes of county government in satisfying their constituents also ranked Mutua's Machakos the best.

== Gubernatorial tenure performance ==
In his 10-year tenure as governor, Mutua improved infrastructure through lobbying international development partners, collaborations with the National Government and County Government initiatives. Machakos County now boasts over 200 kilometres of new tarmac roads and over 8,000 kilometres of graded roads that have greatly increased access across the county.

Interventions in the Agricultural sector saw the people of Machakos move from being dependent on government food relief during drought and famine to being self-sufficient and trading their surplus produce with neighboring Counties of Kitui, Makueni and Kajiado. Policies such as subsidized fertilizers to the farmers, free hybrid seedlings from the county government, and provision of extension services from qualified agricultural officers saw farmers improve yields and value addition for their produce.

The provision of water to the people of Machakos remained a core of Mutua's administration. With over 500 solar-powered boreholes dug and equipped between 2013 and 2022 in all sub-counties, 240 dams and pans and 216 weirs, the water problem is far from over, but great strides were made.

Mutua initiated scholarships for the youth in Machakos wishing to pursue courses at Certificate, Diploma and Degree levels. Collaborations with International Universities for Machakos youth at subsidized costs were made that provided them with international exposure.

To equip the youth with employable skills, in 2016, Mutua initiated a FREE vocational Training Program where Machakos youth could study for free in all Government vocational colleges within the county. This saw a visible increase in skilled plumbers, dressmakers, mechanics, and masons from the county, who continue to export their skills across the country, becoming productive Kenyan taxpayers whose success trickles down to ultimately improve their families' quality of life.

A sports and recreational enthusiast, Mutua promoted Machakos as a premier sports tourism hub. The iconic Machakos Stadium, which from 2014 to 2017 remained the only FIFA-accredited stadium built by a county government, has hosted international matches ranging from CECAFA, World Cup Women's qualifiers, and Rugby tournaments. Mutua also initiated the construction of 8 stadiums across the Sub-counties, complete with staffed sports academies that will go a long way in nurturing the sporting talent of the youth in every Sub-county. The Machakos Peoples' Park which was built in his first term has won awards as the best public park in Kenya and is the starting point for the annual Tour De Machakos and home to the popular film festival Machakos Fest.

At the forefront of the fight against cancer, Mutua initiated cancer awareness campaigns across all the Sub-counties, with over 3,000 residents tested. Through the health centre rehabilitation program that has seen all health centers equipped, staffed and stocked with medicines, residents can now get screened for cancer for free in all health centres.

Machakos became the first regional government to open a Cancer Centre, and now, the Machakos Cancer Treatment and Research facility is fully operational and provides free treatment registered under the Universal Health Coverage (UHC). His emphasis on health has transformed Machakos to be the premier health county on Kenya.

Mutua's 10-year tenure as Machakos Governor saw Machakos County transform into an investment hub as both local and international investors gained confidence in Machakos County. Land value in Machakos appreciated exponentially and under his guidance, strong structures and transformative policies that have continually uplifted the lives of the residents of Machakos continue to be developed.

On 9 December 2021, at the second edition of the Africa Illustrious Awards 2021 in Lagos, Nigeria, Mutua was feted as the Best Governor of the Year due to his work in Community Development, Healthcare, recreational facilities, infrastructure and Health Care.

Mutua introduced the argument of lifestyle audits for all Government officials and up to date, he is the only Kenyan government official to take himself to the Ethics and Anti-Corruption Commission (EACC) to avail details of his wealth and to request a lifestyle audit to be conducted on him and his close relatives.

== Presidential ambitions ==
Mutua announced his entry into the 2022 Presidential Elections on 6 September 2020. He would seek the people's mandate to serve as the 5th President of the Republic of Kenya. Offering creative and innovative ideas to govern the Country, Mutua pledged to help Kenyans to grow wealth and completely eradicate corruption – the vice that has greatly affected service delivery in the country.

However, later on in 2022, Mutua dropped his presidential ambition. In May 2022, he drummed his support for William Ruto's presidential bid. Ruto was voted in as the 5th President of the Republic of Kenya in the August 2022 polls and consequently inaugurated on 13 September 2022. Mutua's support for Ruto was not in vain as he was announced by President Ruto as the CS of Foreign and Diaspora affairs on 27 September 2022, in Ruto's cabinet formation. He was later dismissed together with the entire Cabinet in July 2024 but was one of 12 Cabinet members reappointed less than a month later.

== Personal life ==
Mutua married Josephine Thitu on 1 July 2000 at a church ceremony in Nairobi Baptist Ngong Road. In the course of their marriage, the two got three children. The marriage between Alfred and Josephine however came to an end in 2015 which led to Josephine together with their 3 children relocating to Australia. This followed a bitter court battle for Children's custody and property ownership between the two parties. In 2016, the court dismissed the matrimonial property suit that Mutua had lodged seeking to have the property that was acquired within the course of the marriage be divided.

After the end of his first marriage, Mutua began a romantic relationship with his then-partner, Lilian Ng'ang'a. The 7-year-old relationship would come to an end in June 2021, and it was announced by both Mutua and Lilian on their Social Media Accounts.
