= Athi River (town) =

Athi River Mavoko
- Municipality
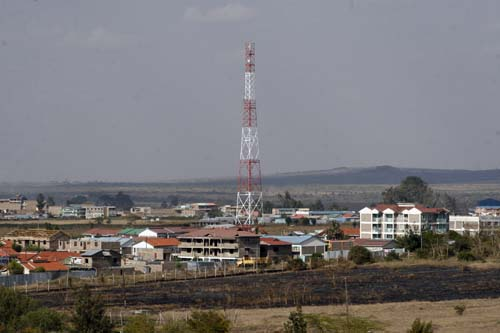
- Photo of Athi River

- Location in Kenya
- Coordinates: 1°27′S 36°59′E
- Country: Kenya
- County: Machakos County

Area
  - Total: 693 km^{2} (268 sq mi)

Population (2019)
  - Total: 81,302
  - Density: 117/km^{2} (304/sq mi)
- Time zone: UTC+3 (EAT)
- Climate: Cwb
- Website: mavokomunicipal.or.ke

Athi River is a town outside Nairobi, Kenya in Machakos County. The town is named after the Athi River, which passes through. It is also known as Mavoko.

Athi River hosts the Mavoko Municipal Council and is the headquarters of Mavoko division, which is part of Machakos County. The town's population is 81,302 (2019 census), and it is still growing due to its proximity to the Kenyan capital city of Nairobi.

== Metropolitan area ==
Athi River is part of the Greater Nairobi Metropolitan area.

== History ==
Athi River, also known as Mavoko, was carved off the Nairobi County Council in 1963, when the latter was disbanded. Mavoko municipality has four wards (Athi River, Mlolongo /Syokimau, Kinanie/Mathatani,Muthwani). All these wards belong to Mavoko constituency, which has a total of four wards. The remaining four wards are within Masaku County Council.

== Industry ==
The town is relatively industrialised for Kenya. There are six cement factories located within the town: Bamburi Cement, Mombasa Cement, East Africa Portland Cement Company, Savannah Cement, National Cement, Kenya Meat Commission and Athi River Mining.

The town is home to a chewing gum factory owned by the Wrigley Company.

There are also other notable companies within the town's outskirts such as Doshi Steel, Mabati Rolling Mills, Seed Co., Kapa Oil Refineries and Devki Steel.

== Business ==
Athi River is experiencing sprouting businesses, some of the more notable ones including the Coloho Mall, Crystal Rivers Safaricom Mall, Trailink Logistics, and the Wattle Blossom Retreat Centre. Some of the factors influencing the rapid growth of businesses in the area include the increased real estate development in the region and the proximity to Nairobi City and mining companies.

== Education ==
The Daystar University has a campus in the town. Meat Training Institute is also located in the town.

== Transport ==
Athi River has a railway station built in 1920 along the Uganda Railway, from Mombasa to Kisumu. There is also a new railway station on the Mombasa–Nairobi Standard Gauge Railway.

Athi River is also linked to Nairobi via the Nairobi-Mombasa Highway (commonly known as Mombasa Road), a tarmacked dual carriageway, and to nearby Kitengela by Namanga Road, a tarmacked single carriageway. Residents of Athi River are served by Routes 110 and 120 to the Nairobi CBD.
