= Governor of Machakos =

Chief executive of the Kenya Devolved Government of Machakos County

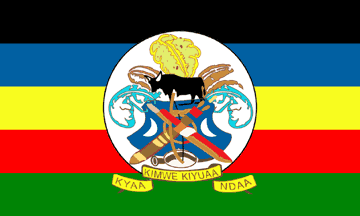
- Flag of the County of Machakos
- Incumbent; Wavinya Ndeti since 25 August 2022
- Style: Her Excellency
- Residence: de jure (Machakos), de facto Masaku
- Term length: Five years, two term limit
- Inaugural holder: Alfred Mutua
- Formation: March 27, 2013
- Deputy: Francis Maliti

The governor of the County of Machakos is the chief executive of the Kenya Devolved Government of Machakos County. The governor is the head of the executive branch of County government of Machakos.

The current governor is Wavinya Ndeti, of Wiper Party. Wavinya Ndeti is the second governor of the County.
