= Machakos County =

- County
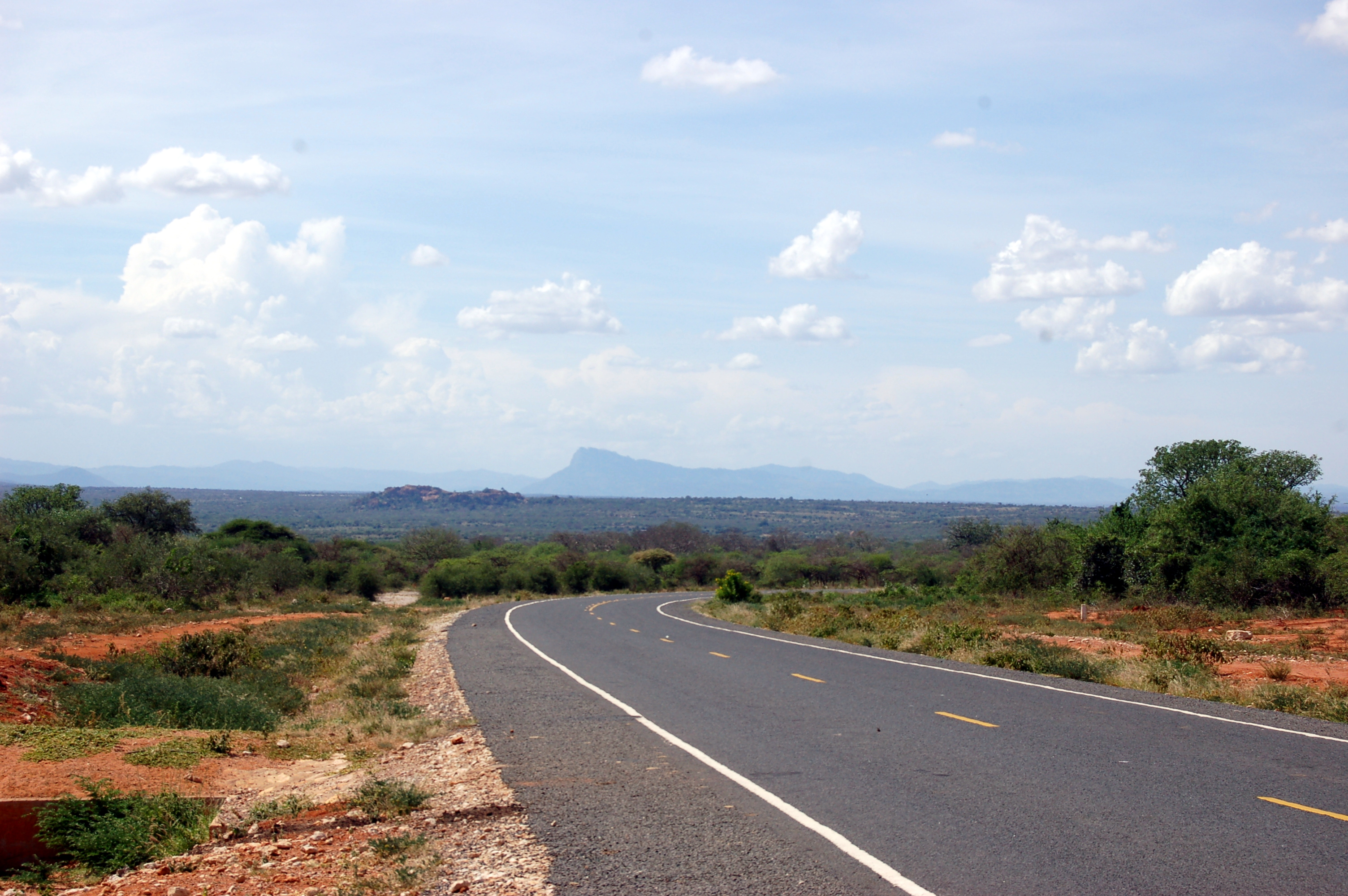
- Road in Machakos County showing the landscape

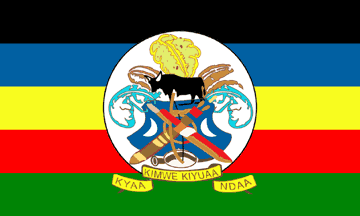
- Flag
- Motto: "the Place to be"
- Location in Kenya
- Coordinates: 01°14′S 37°23′E
- Country: Kenya
- Formed: 4 March 2013
- Capital: Machakos
- Other towns: List: Athi River; Mavoko; Kangundo; Tala; Masii

Government
  - Governor: Wavinya Ndeti

Area
  - County: 6,043 km^{2} (2,333 sq mi)
- Elevation: 1,138 m (3,734 ft)

Population (2019)
  - County: 1,421,932
  - Density: 235.3/km^{2} (609.4/sq mi)
  - Metro: 150,041

GDP (PPP)
  - GDP: ▲$8.809 billion (6th)(2022)
  - Per Capita: ▲$5,985 (2022) (7th)

GDP (NOMINAL)
  - GDP: ▲$3.235 billion (2022) (6th)
  - Per Capita: ▲$2,197 (2022) (7th)
- Time zone: UTC+3 (EAT)
  - Summer (DST): UTC+3

Machakos County is one of the 47 counties of Kenya, which came into being as part of the devolved system of governance occasioned by the 2010 constitution of Kenya. It is also part of the Nairobi Metropolitan Area, the largest metropolitan area in East Africa containing 15.95 million people. The county's administrative headquarters are in Machakos Town, which is the largest town in the county. The county had a population of 1,421,939 as of 2019. The county borders Nairobi and Kiambu counties to the west, Embu to the north, Kitui to the east, Makueni to the south, Kajiado to the south west, and Murang'a and Kirinyaga to the north west.

== Religion ==
Religion in Machakos County

Religion (2019 Census)	Number
Catholicism	500,115
Protestant	582,456
Evangelical Churches	217,122
African instituted Churches	55,175
Orthodox	2,405
Other Christian	23,935
Islam	12,984
Hindu	976
Traditionists	987
Other	6900
No Religion/Atheist	9,384
Don't Know	1,377
Not Stated	166

== Government ==
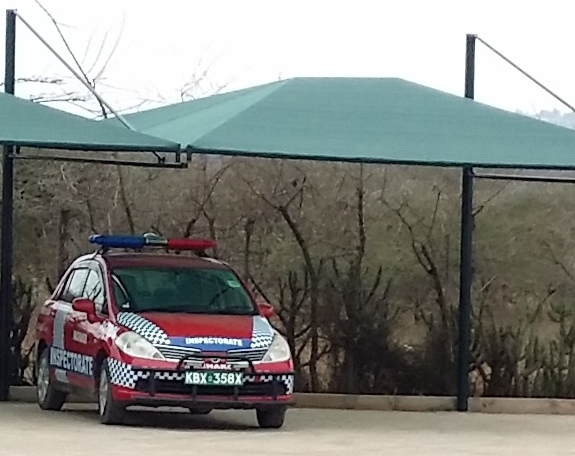
Machakos County Enforcement Vehicle

The Machakos County Government is composed of two arms, the County Executive and the County Assembly. County Executive is headed by a governor. The office of the Governor of Machakos was created on 27 March 2013. Alfred Mutua, served as the inaugural holder of the office. following his election in 2012. He was re-elected in the 2017 general elections. The Machakos County Assembly is headed by a Speaker elected by its members. The incumbent Speaker is Mrs. Ann Kiusya.

Hon Wavinya Ndeti was in 2022 elected as the second governor of Machakos County, becoming the first female governor in the county and also among the 8 female governors that were historically elected in the 2022 elections, an historic rise from the 3 that were elected in the 2017 elections.

Office of the Governor is located at White House along Peoples Park road, Miwani area in Machakos town environs. The first Director of Administration and Special Programmes and White House Administrator was Dr. Dominic Musembi PhD.

== Education ==
There are many primary schools in Machakos County, including Machakos Primary School, Kathiini primary School and Machakos Academy.

Machakos County has giant secondary schools such as Machakos School (boys), Machakos Girls' School, Mumbuni Boys' Secondary School, Mumbuni Girls' Secondary School, Masii Boys' Secondary School, Tala Girls' School, Matungulu Girls' High School, Mwala School, ST. Teresa Mwala Girls, Kitulu Day Secondary School and Kabaa High School (boys), which boasts of a castle which was left behind by Christian missionaries. This castle is now a museum.

Kwanthanze Secondary School, which is also found in Machakos County, is famous for its volleyball championship in the country.

Universities and colleges within Machakos County include Machakos University, Scott Christian University, South Eastern Kenya University (SEKU), St. Paul's University, Kenya Institute of Management, African Training Center for Research and Technology, Century Park College, Machakos Institute of Technology, Kenya Medical Training College (KMTC) Machakos campus and Machakos Technical Training Institute for the Blind.

== Climate ==
The local climate is semi-arid with hilly terrain and an altitude of 1000 to 2100 metres above sea level.

Tourist-related activities include camping, hiking safaris, ecotourism and cultural tourism, dance and music festivals.

== Economy ==
Machakos County is the 6th largest economy in Kenya with a GDP (PPP) of $8.3B. It is also the 7th richest county in Kenya by GDP per capita.

Subsistence agriculture is mostly practiced with maize and drought-resistant crops such as sorghum and millet being grown due to the area's semi-arid state. The county also plays host to the open air market concept with major market days where large amounts of produce are traded. Fruits, vegetables and other food stuffs like maize and beans are sold in these markets.

=== Future ===
The county is banking on projects such as the Konza Technology City, a new Machakos City and its proximity to Nairobi County to boost output in the economy.

== Services ==
Stats for Machakos County
County	Stats for the county (per cent)
Literacy	88
Attending school (15-18 Yrs)	75.9
Paved roads	6.9
Good roads	26.9
Electricity access	17
Stats for the county

Source: USAid Kenya

== Subdivisions ==
Local authorities (councils)
Authority	Type	Population*	Urban pop.*
Machakos	Municipality	144,109	28,891
Mavoko (Athi River)	Municipality	48,260	22,167
Kangundo	Town	187,389	9,122
Matuu	Town	44,922	5,321
Masaku	County	481,964	9,088
* 1999 census. Source:

Administrative divisions
Division	Population*	Urban pop.*	Headquarters
Kalama	41,000	0	
Kangundo	91,238	3,786	Kangundo
Kathiani	95,096	2,929	Mitaboni
Machakos Central	143274	26,438	Machakos
Masinga	74,478	654	Masinga
Matungulu	99,731	4,734	Tala
Mavoko	48,936	19,177	Athi River
Mwala	89,211	2,708	
Ndithini	32,358	0	
Yathui	65,567	481	Wamunyu
Yatta	125,755	4913	Matuu
* 1999 census. Sources:

The county has eight constituencies:

- Masinga Constituency
- Yatta Constituency
- Kangundo Constituency
- Matungulu Constituency
- Kathiani Constituency
- Mavoko Constituency
- Machakos Town Constituency
- Mwala Constituency

== Nairobi metro ==
Northern regions of Machakos County are within Greater Nairobi which consists of 4 out of 47 counties in Kenya, but the area generates about 60% of the nation's wealth.

== Statistics ==
=== Nairobi Metro ===
==== Urbanisation ====
Urbanisation in Nairobi Metro
County	Urbanisation in Nairobi Metro (per cent)
Nairobi County	100
Kiambu County	60.8
Machakos County	52
Kajiado County	41.4
Kenya average	32.3
Urbanisation by county within Nairobi Metro

Source: OpenDataKenya

==== Wealth/poverty level ====
Wealth/poverty Level in Nairobi Metro
County	Poverty level in Nairobi Metro (per cent)
Kajiado County	11.6
Kiambu County	21.8
Nairobi County	22
Machakos County	59.6
Kenya average	45.9
Poverty level by county

Source: OpenDataKenya Worldbank

=== South Eastern Kenya Region ===
==== Urbanisation ====
Urbanisation in South Eastern Kenya
County	Urbanisation in South Eastern Kenya (per cent)
Machakos County	52
Kitui County	13.8
Makueni County	11.8
Kenya average	32.3
Urbanisation by county in South Eastern Kenya

Source: OpenDataKenya

==== Wealth/poverty level ====
Wealth/poverty Level in South Eastern Kenya
County	Poverty Level in South Eastern Kenya (per cent)
Machakos County	59.6
Kitui County	63.1
Makueni County	64.1
Kenya average	45.9
Poverty level by county

Source: OpenDataKenya Worldbank

== Notable people ==
- Prophetess Syokimau - Kamba Medicine Woman and prophetess
- Paul Ngei - Anti-colonial activist
- Jackson Mulinge - former chief of the General Staff of the Kenya Defence Forces
- Raphael S. Ndingi Mwana a'Nzeki - former archbishop of the Roman Catholic Archdiocese of Nairobi
- Crispus Makau Kiamba - 5th vice-chancellor of the University of Nairobi
- Peter Mbithi - 7th vice-chancellor of the University of Nairobi
- Kakai Kilonzo - Benga musician of Les Kilimambogo Brothers
- Mike Sonko - former governor of Nairobi County
- Martin Kivuva Musonde - Roman Catholic archbishop of the Archdiocese of Mombasa
- Patrick Makau - former marathon world record holder
- Jackson Kivuva - Kenyan middle-distance runner
- Alfred Mutua - Cabinet Secretary for Tourism and Wildlife
- Johnson Muthama - former chairman of United Democratic Alliance
- Daniel Ndambuki - Kenyan comedian who hosts the comedy television show Churchill Show
- Caleb Ndiku - Kenyan middle- and long-distance runner
- Joseph Mutua - former African Indoor 800 metres record holder
- David Mulwa - Writer, theatre director and lecturer
- Wavinya Ndeti - Governor of Machakos County

== See also ==
- Kitui County
- Makueni County
- Embu County
- Kirinyaga County
- Muranga County
- Machakos County Governor
