= Ituri war (2017–present) =

War in Democratic Republic of the Congo

- Part of the Ituri conflict
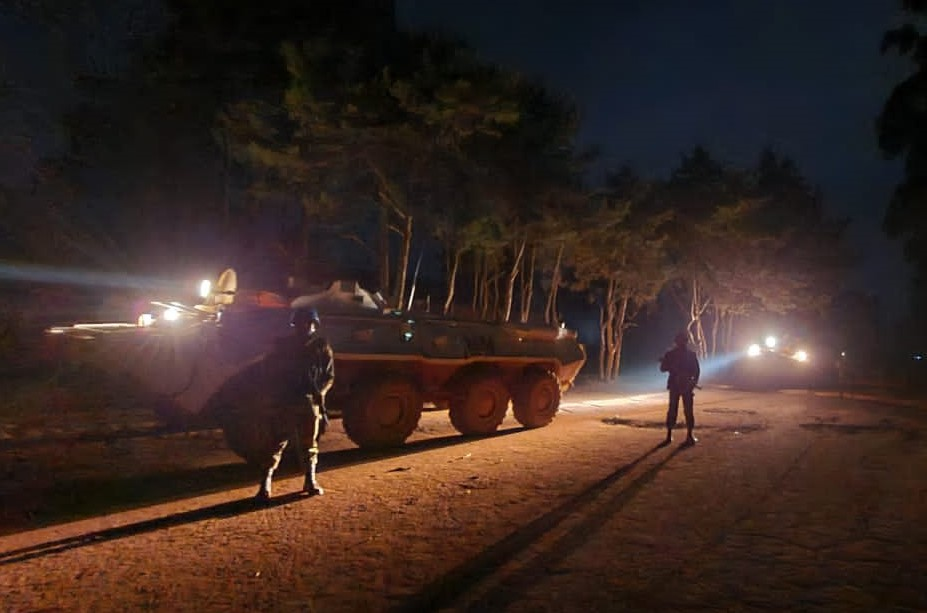
- MONUSCO does a night patrol in Ituri, December 2021
Date	June 5, 2017 – present (9 years, 5 months and 1 week)
Location	Djugu Territory, Mahagi Territory and Irumu Territory, Ituri Province, Democratic Republic of the Congo
Status	Ongoing: CODECO splits into multiple factions; State of siege imposed by Felix Tshisekedi in May 2021

Belligerents
CODECO (Note: Until Justin Ngudjolo's death in March 2019, CODECO was a singular militia. After his death, various factions have emerged and all are colloquially referred to as CODECO. These factions are loosely affiliated with each other, and sometimes infight.); URPDC faction (Note: The URPDC was its own group between 2018 and 2020.); ALC faction; ARDPC faction; Bon Temple faction; Catholic faction; Islamic faction; FPIC; FPIC-Chambre Noire-Sanduku; FDBC; Gutsi group; Mai-Mai Sambaza; Tchini ya Tuna	Congo River Alliance (Note: Since 2024.); M23 (Note: Since 2024, albeit in training and logistics only.); Zaïre; MAPI; CRP; CNLC	Democratic Republic of the Congo; FARDC; 2nd Battalion; 3308th Regiment; 3201st Regiment; 32nd Military Region; PNC; MONUSCO; UPDF; 4th Infantry Division	Islamic State; Central Africa Province

Commanders and leaders
Justin Ngudjolo †; Desire Lokana; Basa Zukpa Gerson; Olivier Ngabu Ngawi; Mukwake Mambo †; Tuwo †; Justin Maki Gesi †; Charite Nguna Kiza; Songambele Selyabo; Radjabho Tababho Soborabo	Thomas Lubanga Dyilo; Yves Kahwa Mandro Panga; Zawadi Vajeru; Logo Marine; Baraka Amos Maki; Pharaon Fidele Babala	Felix Tshisekedi; Johnny Luboya Nkashama; Jean Bamanisa; Pene Mbaka; Gaby Kasongo Mulumba; Muhoozi Kainerugaba; Felix Busizoori	(Islamic State) Unknown

Strength
~10,000-15,000 (2026, see Actors)	2,500-3,000 (2025)	20,000 (2019); 15,000 (2021); 18,316; 6,000 (2026)	(Islamic State) Unknown

Casualties and losses
324+ killed 3+ POWs; Several wounded	Unknown	111+ killed (Note: At least 32 FARDC and PNC were killed and 46 wounded between December 2017 and August 2018 per PAX for Peace, and 16 were killed and seven kidnapped between January 2019 and June 10, 2019 per Governance in Conflict. Another 63 were killed in Zaruba ya Ituri II.); 46 wounded 7 kidnapped	(Islamic State) Unknown
- 7,375+ civilians killed (Note: See casualties. There are no comprehensive death tolls, and this death toll is an amalgamation of death tolls within certain timeframes. It does not include war-related casualties from displacement or sickness outside the 2018 cholera outbreak.); 1,150,000-1,777,000+ displaced (Note: The 1,777,000 number is the highest reported number of displaced at one moment, that being November 2021. The 1,150,000 number is from July 2026. See displacement for more information on the opacity of exact displacement numbers.)

Since December 2017, renewed war broke out between Lendu militias and Hema militias over land disputes in Ituri Province, Democratic Republic of the Congo. The uptick in violence came after ten years of peace between the Lendu and Hema after the First Ituri war between 1999 and 2003, a subset of the Second Congo War that devolved into the long-standing Ituri conflict. The renewed war in 2017 saw the introduction of violent Lendu militia CODECO become the dominant Lendu actor in the region, while groups like Zaïre-FPAC were founded to defend the Hema. Both groups went to war with the Armed Forces of the Democratic Republic of the Congo (FARDC) and MONUSCO, and the Islamic State – Central Africa Province (ISCAP) has exploited the situation to conduct massacres in Ituri province.

== Background ==
While land disputes between the Lendu and the Hema have always existed, the two groups have also had a long history of peaceful residence and often intermarry. Government favoritism of the Hema traces back to the Belgian colonial era, where Belgian administrators prioritized Hema in political positions, and subsequently in education, church roles, and more. This has led to the Hema having more political power and power over land. This favoritism continued into independent D.R. Congo and Zaire, where Hema used their political favoritism to obtain even more land under a controversial 1973 land law.

Between 1999 and 2003, amid the Second Congo War, sedentary Lendu farmers and pastoralist Hema herders took up arms and formed militias over land disputes. The Uganda People's Defence Force (UPDF) and their allied militia the Kisangani faction of the Rally for Congolese Democracy (RCD-K) controlled what is now Ituri. Under Ugandan rule in 1999, Ituri province was created and a Hema was named governor, despite RCD-K protests. Lendu militants took up arms, convinced that the UPDF and RCD-K were backing the Hema in a war against them. Rwanda and the Congolese government both backed opposing militias, leading to a bloody war that did not end until 2003.

The Congolese government then instated a fragile peace with successful elections running Lendu and Hema candidates, along with candidates from the Alur minority. Between 2003 and 2017, despite the presence of MONUSCO and MONUC peacekeepers, the Lendu Patriotic Resistance Front of Ituri led a low-level insurgency in Ituri. After the Congolese government recognized Ituri Province in 2015, Jefferson Abdallah Pene Mbaka (better known as Pene Mbaka), a Lendu, became the first provincial governor. Pacifique Keta Upar, an Alur, was elected as vice governor in 2016 and Hema officials were prevalent in the government.

For ten years, the Lendu and Hema lived in relative peace though the scars of the 1999-2003 war were fresh in many people's minds.

=== Death of Father Dhunji ===
The casus belli for the war was the death of Father Florent Dhunji, a Lendu priest in Drodro, on June 5, 2017. Lendu groups immediately began accusing Hema of killing Dhunji and planning on exterminating the Lendu, and a resurgence in hate speech on both sides occurred. In one case, Hema who were publicly drinking began mocking Dhunji's death and the broader Lendu community in Drodro. Dhunji's official cause of death was alcoholism, but no investigation has been carried out. This was inflamed by the Catholic Church's silence on the circumstances revolving around Dhunji's death. However, despite rumors of violence and the increased segregation of Lendu and Hema by youth in those groups, very few inter-ethnic clashes took place between June and December 2017.

== Djugu conflict ==
Uzi violence

The first major skirmish between Lendu and Hema youth took place in the village of Uzi, in Djugu territory on December 17, 2017. Lendu youth had an altercation with a soldier at the military post in Uzi after they tried to steal arms and were identified by Hema women from the village of Maze. The Lendu man apparently tried to steal the weapons as reprisal for FARDC imposition of roadblock taxes. Later, young Hema men went to beat up the Lendu man. The next day, Lendu youth injured three Hema women with a machete in a field in Lendu territory in Ladedjo. Hema youth then burnt down the village of Tete, destroying dozens to hundreds of homes. On the same day as the torching of Tete, MONUSCO announced that they would be closing their base at Bogoro, the site of a brutal 2003 massacre.

Hema said that they were shocked "when neighbors became murderers overnight", but a Lendu leader said that it was not an ethnic conflict. Governor Pene Mbaka announced on December 22 that he managed to negotiate a peace between the communities through dialogue with local leaders. After this speech, there was no reported violence for a month.

February–April 2018 attacks

The second round of attacks began on February 4, when at least 32 people were killed and 400 homes were burned in villages in Bahema-Nord, a Hema community. Three days later, more attacks in Bahema-Nord and Banyani Kilo killed nine people. An attack on February 8 killed 37 people in the same area. More attacks occurred on February 10, when at least 19 people from villages in Bahema-Nord were killed. The largest massacre took place in Rule, where 60 people were killed and the village was burned down. Five Hema were killed in attacks on villages in Bahema Badjere as well. For the most part, large-scale civilian massacres ended in late February, with the exception of five civilians killed between February 24 and 27.

On February 20, Lendu militiamen attacked a FARDC post in Tche, Bahema-Nord and Bakome, Walendu-Djatsi, killing two soldiers. This was the first attack by Lendu militiamen on Congolese government forces, and served as a way for these militias to gather arms and deter any opposition to Lendu attacks.

In March, attacks reinflamed with a massacre by Lendu militants that killed between 36 and 43 people in the villages of Maze and Beliba, Bahema-Nord, on March 1. Between March 1 and 8, at least 31 civilians were killed across thirteen villages in Bahema-Nord and Bahema Banywagi. Five Congolese soldiers were killed as well. On March 13, at least 27 people were killed in the villages of Jjo, Gbi, and Ngazba in Bahema Nord. One soldier was killed and four were injured in Penyi, Walendu-Tatsi, on March 24.

The violence in Djugu largely dissipated after April, and a small string of tit-for-tat attacks followed until August. The attacks between February and March are considered the peak of the Djugu violence in 2018, and there was an attack happening on a village in Bahema-Nord or Walendu-Djatsi every day. The majority of the attacks taking place in Ituri thus far took place in five chiefdoms of Djugu territory; Bahema-Nord, Walendu-Pitsi, Walendu-Djatsi, Walendu-Tatsi, and Bahema Banywagi. In many of these massacres, the militants raped civilians.

Almost all of the attacks targeted Hema and Bagagere, but some Lendu were killed and attacked. No perpetrators were fully identified, but a militia formed in the Lendu Walendu-Pitsi and Walendu-Djatsi chiefdoms was to blame, despite some opaqueness as to whether the attackers were actually Lendu. However, many respondents interviewed in June and July 2018 by PAX For Peace said that the violence did have a strong correlation with local politics, and accused Lendu and Hema leaders - particularly the ex-FPRI Longbe Chabi Linga and ex-UPC Pilo Kamaragi Mulindro - with ex-militant backgrounds for stoking the conflict while publicly calling for peace. The New Humanitarian, citing analysts, said that oil and minerals resources desired by politicians was among the drivers of the war. At least 48,000 people were displaced from the attacks as of March 8. In July, this number had reportedly risen to 350,000.

=== CODECO involvement and lull ===
CODECO, a majority-Lendu militia, had been around since the 1970s, originally formed as an agricultural cooperative that also made magical and fetishistic substances. These substances, called dawa, were given to FPRI fighters during the 1999-2003 war to aid them in combat and boost morale. As early as June 2017, CODECO banked on the popular anger of many young Lendu and ex-Nationalist and Integrationist Front (FNI) fighters and began training them for combat. Ituri governor Pene Mbaka attempted to crack down on CODECO legally, but no attempt to disarm the militia or interrupt its training took place.

In August 2018 a new wave of Lendu violence, led by CODECO and its commander Mukwake Mambo and sub-commander Lokana Mambo, targeted FARDC military posts and soldiers. In one attack on FARDC and Congolese National Police (PNC) in the villages of Muvaramu, Songamoya, and Tara on September 16, nine soldiers were killed. Eight days later on September 24, in another FARDC attack on Bule, Mukwake Mambo was wounded and died of his injuries a few days later. Justin Ngudjolo took over as leader of CODECO shortly after. Between December 2017 and August 2018, 19 FARDC soldiers were killed and four were wounded. After September 2018 and until April 2019, the conflict subsided with steady small attacks. This drop in attacks was pinned on the 2018 Congolese elections.

Between December 2017 and August 2018, according to the Dutch institute PAX for Peace, at least eight attackers were killed including Mukwake Mambo, three were taken prisoner, and several were wounded. At least 32 FARDC soldiers and policemen were killed and 46 were injured, and at least 496 civilians were killed and 178 more were injured. In addition, thousands of homes were destroyed and hundreds of livestock were looted and ransacked.

=== Post-election resurgence ===
The first major post-election attack began on January 22, when four soldiers and three attackers were killed in a skirmish in Largu. A few weeks later on February 15 another skirmish broke out with surrounding residents fleeing. In April, the pace of attacks by Lendu militias and CODECO increased. Three people - two FARDC soldiers and one policeman - were killed in Nyapala on April 5, and two days later five people were killed at a market. More attacks took place between April 11 and 16, but few casualties were reported.

In the first weeks of May, FARDC took a more proactive role in fighting against CODECO and Lendu militias. Three people were killed in a clash between FARDC and attackers in Walendu Pitsi on May 6 and later seven FARDC soldiers were kidnapped after they tracked the attackers to the Wago forest. Fighting took place along Lake Albert.

Between January 2019 and June 10, 2019, sixteen FARDC soldiers and policemen were killed, seven were taken prisoner, six attackers were killed and several arrested, and 20 civilians were killed in attacks in Djugu and Mahagi territories.

== Operation Zaruba ya Ituri ==
=== June 2019 massacres ===
On June 10, 2019, following increased Lendu attacks on Hema communities, gunmen (Note: International Crisis Group says "suspected Hema actors" while Governance in Conflict says CODECO was behind the killing, with the backing of local Lendu businessmen.) killed four Lendu traders in the village of Bembu-Nzi, including a prominent Lendu trader named Tikpa. In response, Lendu militias and CODECO conducted a spree of massacres on Hema communities, killing at least 400 people and forcing thousands to flee. One particular attack killed 38 people in Tche on June 11, although some estimates say at least 161 people were killed in Tche alone. The attacks lasted for weeks, ending on June 29. At least 360,000 people were displaced in June. In response to the renewed Lendu offensive, the Congolese army launched Operation Zaruba ya Ituri on June 26 with the goal of clearing CODECO militants from the area. At least 20,000 soldiers took part in the operation. MONUSCO joined the operation on June 11, 2020, already having 18,316 personnel in Ituri.

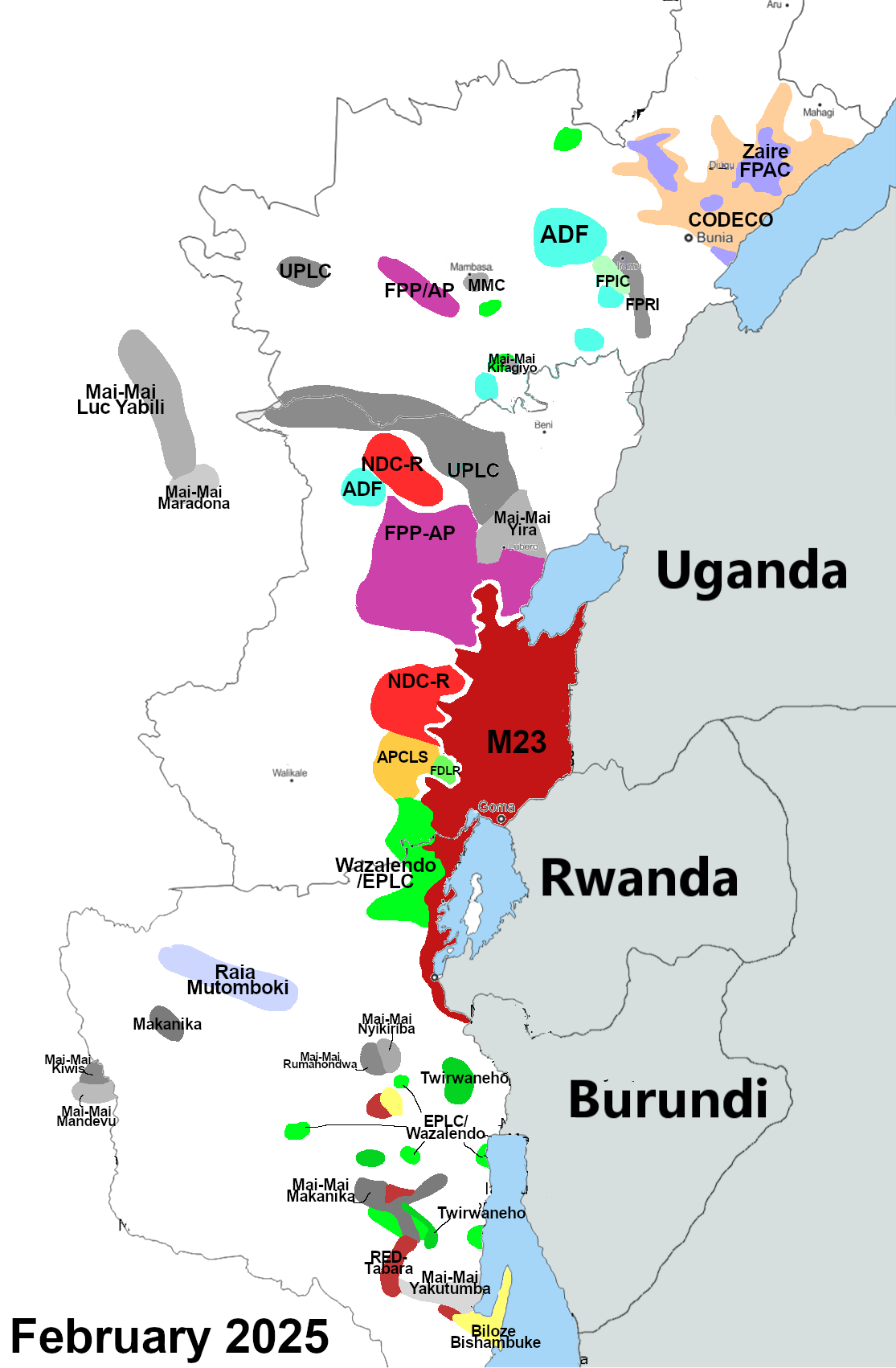
A map of major armed groups in the Kivu conflict. Ituri is up north.

The first success of Operation Zaruba ya Ituri was the clearing of the Wago forest, where CODECO trained and held dawa rituals. Nine soldiers were killed in the clearing of the forest, which had been a staging base for many attacks on civilian communities in the previous two weeks. Despite CODECO attacks earlier in the year and the uptick in attacks in June sometimes targeting Lendu civilians, increased FARDC activity against Lendu militiamen and CODECO pushed some Lendu civilians to sympathize with and join CODECO due to previous favoritism of Hema by the Congolese government. Jean Bamanisa, the governor of Ituri, accused the Banyabwisha (Note: Hutu migrants from North Kivu.) of participating in the massacres and the Rwandan government and M23 for supporting them, but there was little evidence to support this.

On June 11, Justin Ngudjolo announced that he was the new leader of CODECO and that he had mobilized 2,350 Lendu militants to protect against the Hema. Many CODECO fighters were former militants in the FNI, and little to none had connections with the FPRI. However, Ngudjolo's CODECO did not have the respect or support of all Lendu politicians, and some actively spoke against CODECO.

President Félix Tshisekedi visited Djugu on June 30, Congolese independence day, to ease tensions. In his speech, he vowed to eliminate CODECO, although he did not name the group. He did, however, call the massacres an "attempted genocide". Despite his calls for peace and the return of Hema Yves Mandro Kahwa Panga, a warlord in the first Ituri war, clashes continued in the territory through July 12. In late July, the previously unaffected Alur community in Irumu Territory became drawn into the carnage when CODECO militants killed eight Alur on July 16. A day later, two more Alur were killed in Irumu. Throughout July, dozens of civilians were killed in CODECO attacks, and several soldiers and attackers were killed in fighting between CODECO and FARDC. Tensions largely cooled down in August, with only one attack involving the deaths of six civilians being reported.

In September, the carnage picked up, with at least 50 civilians being killed in Djugu and Mahagi between September 17–19. A MONUSCO base was also attacked that same weekend. Shortly afterward, Ngudjolo announced his intent to negotiate with the Ituri government; negotiations went well and were well received by the population, but the idea of a general amnesty (proposed by Ngudjolo) was rejected. A Deed of Commitment was signed in Rethy on October 19.

Peace efforts came to a standstill between October and November, and around the same time CODECO began a fresh spate of attacks along Lake Albert. By the end of December 2019, at least 700 people had been killed in Ituri. At least 500,000 people had been displaced by the end of the year, and thousands of homes had been destroyed.

== CODECO fracture ==
In January 2020, after Congolese troops were redeployed to North Kivu in response to increased conflict, CODECO took over several villages in Bahema-Nord and all of Walendu-Pitsi, including its capital Kpandroma. These attacks in Ituri were claimed by the Union of Revolutionaries for the Defense of the Congolese People (URPDC), which was formed in 2018 and rejects the name CODECO and "Ngudjolo armed group". At least 50 civilians were killed in March 2020.

In March 2020, a Congolese government campaign against CODECO severely diminished the group's ability to confront government attacks, although attacks on civilians continued. The FARDC managed to kill Justin Ngudjolo in March 2020 in the village of Mokpa, the government's largest success thus far against CODECO. Ngudjolo's death fractured the group, and multiple groups vied for control. A dominant group following Ngudjolo's death was the URPDC. His death was compounded by the arrest of the two CODECO leaders for Walendu-Pitsi - Raymond Tseni Adrionzi and Joseph "Kesta" Amula - on March 17.

CODECO attacks increased against civilians, both because of Ngudjolo's death and also because of a peace agreement between the Congolese government and the FPRI, where the Congolese government accepted the FPRI's conditions (which were the same as CODECO's in October). On April 10, 17 people were killed by CODECO in the village of Dhalla, and 28 people were killed three days later in the villages of Ndoki-Koli and Dzathi. Three soldiers and two officers were killed in Mwanga on the same day.

Around the same time as Ngudjolo's death, FARDC recaptured Kpandroma and parts of Bahema-Nord. These successes were part of Operation Zaruba ya Ituri 2, and 63 soldiers and 309 militants were killed in the offensive as of May 19. On May 4, Olivier Ngabu Ngawi proclaimed himself as the new head of CODECO in a peace conference with the Ituri government. Another faction, called Sambaza, rejected Ngawi's claims. However, Congolese officials say that at least five new factions have emerged in 2020 alone from CODECO. In June 2020, a CODECO affiliate killed 37 civilians in Bunzenzele.

According to MONUSCO, 531 civilians had been killed between October 2019 and May 31, 2020. 200,000 people were displaced in April 2020 alone, marking a total of 1.2 million displaced since December 2017. International organizations began paying attention to the war in 2020; in January, the United Nations said that the massacres may amount to crimes against humanity, and the International Criminal Court called on the Congolese government to crack down on the perpetrators.

=== Formation of new groups ===
In August 2020, six CODECO factions had agreed to a unilateral ceasefire. CODECO-ALC agreed to a ceasefire as early as July 15, 2020. CODECO-URPDC agreed on August 1. On August 15, the Revolutionary Army for the Defense of the Congolese People (ARDPC), led by self-proclaimed CODECO commander Ngawi, signed the ceasefire. The Gutsi group, independent from CODECO, signed a ceasefire on September 9, as did the Defense Forces Against the Balkanization of the Congo (FDBC).

This caused a lull in violence for the most part, although on September 4 militants from the Alliance for the Liberation of Congo faction of CODECO (CODECO-ALC) entered Bunia and protested at the prison demanding their comrades be freed. Two new militant groups formed in late 2020 as a consequence of CODECO factions signing peace agreements: the Patriotic and Integrationist Force of Ituri (FPIC), a Bira militia, and the Zaïre-FPAC, a coalition of Hema self-defense militias formed to counter CODECO. Zaïre-FPAC is sometimes allied with the FARDC. These two groups were most active in western Djugu territory and northern Irumu territory. FPIC was accused of attacking Irumu town on October 20, 2020, and the town was "virtually empty" for months afterward. The first major attack by FPIC was in Marabho on May 4. Bira civilians who did not support FPIC were targeted by the group and often executed.

CODECO-ALC and CODECO-URPDC broke off from peace agreements in September 2020, and Congolese forces launched an offensive to capture several towns in the province, seizing CODECO-ALC strongholds. Shortly afterward, CODECO-ALC launched a failed attack on Bunia. At least ten to twenty Lendu militias were active in Ituri by October 2020. Charite Nguna Kiza was considered by the UN to be the new commander of CODECO-URDPC after Ngudjolo's death, and Justin Maki Gesi was considered to be CODECO-ALC's commander until his death in October 2020. The splintering of CODECO into multiple groups made its violence more indiscriminate and targeted towards FARDC soldiers.

By October 2020, 1.6 million people had been displaced since the start of the war. A brief skirmish broke out in Ezekere in Bedu on November 4, killing five FARDC soldiers and injuring five more.

== State of siege ==
On May 3, 2021, President Tshisekedi declared a state of siege in North Kivu and Ituri provinces in response to the Allied Democratic Forces insurgency, which was expanding further into Ituri, and the CODECO insurgencies. In effect, the Congolese government in Kinshasa held power in the provinces, and military governors were installed; Johnny Luboya Nkashama in Ituri and Constant Ndima Kongba in North Kivu. All sub-provincial leaders were also appointed by the central government.

In early 2021, President Tshisekedi said that he would launch a new offensive against CODECO and its factions in Ituri province. By this time, most CODECO ceasefires were no longer in effect. The United Nations in 2021 said that by January 2021, "In the context of the absence of any clear process to meet their demands ... the six factions, which signed unilateral ceasefire agreements, remained threats to civilians of all communities." Four of these factions (CODECO-ALC, CODECO-URPDC, FDBC, and CODECO-ARDPC) were involved in attacking civilians.

These groups were able to expand in Ituri - along with Hema groups like Zaïre-FPAC - due to a redeployment of FARDC elsewhere to combat M23 and the Islamic State – Central Africa Province (ISCAP), the latter of which first expanded into southern Ituri in June 2020. At times, different CODECO groups fought and allied among one another; in December 2020, CODECO-URDPC captured CODECO-ARDPC's headquarters of Ala, in Walendu Pitsi. A month later, the FDBC captured the Bon Temple faction of CODECO's headquarters in Nyangaray, Walendu Djatsi. In one instance, CODECO-ALC, FPRI dissidents, and the FPIC were alleged to be in an alliance. Some CODECO groups, in particular the Koba and Nyangaruhi, had connections with Allied Democratic Forces-affiliated preachers and incorporated Quranic teachings in line with jihadist propaganda conveying global ambitions. This ADF-affiliated faction was dubbed CODECO-Islamique.

The primary source of these CODECO-affiliated groups' weaponry was raids on FARDC and MONUSCO bases. The size of the FARDC deployment had decreased by an estimated 5,000 between the start of Operation Zaruba ya Ituri in 2019 and the end of December 2021, and soldiers and officers were known to be engaged in extensive amounts of corruption, dubbed a "mafia state" by Tshisekedi. In one attack in Ritsi, Walendu Djatsi in May 2020, CODECO-URPDC claimed that "soon even the helicopters will fall into our hands." (Note: Except CODECO-URPDC did not actually conduct the attack. Despite the claim, the UN established that CODECO-Bon Temple was responsible for the raid on Ritsi.)

A notable battle between Zaïre-FPAC, CODECO-URPDC and FDBC in Mongbwalu between February 16 and 20, 2021 best explains how these groups, the FARDC, and community militias all interact. The clashes started as a series of reprisal attacks between Hema and Lendu youth; between 24 and 38 people were killed. Two Hema killed in the clashes were suspected of being Zaïre-FPAC militants, and two Lendu were lynched in suspicion of being CODECO militants. Six Alur and Hema miners were killed by CODECO. Between June 2020 and March 2021, at least 559 civilians were killed in Ituri and North Kivu. By August 2021, 1,697,039 people had been displaced in Ituri since 2017.

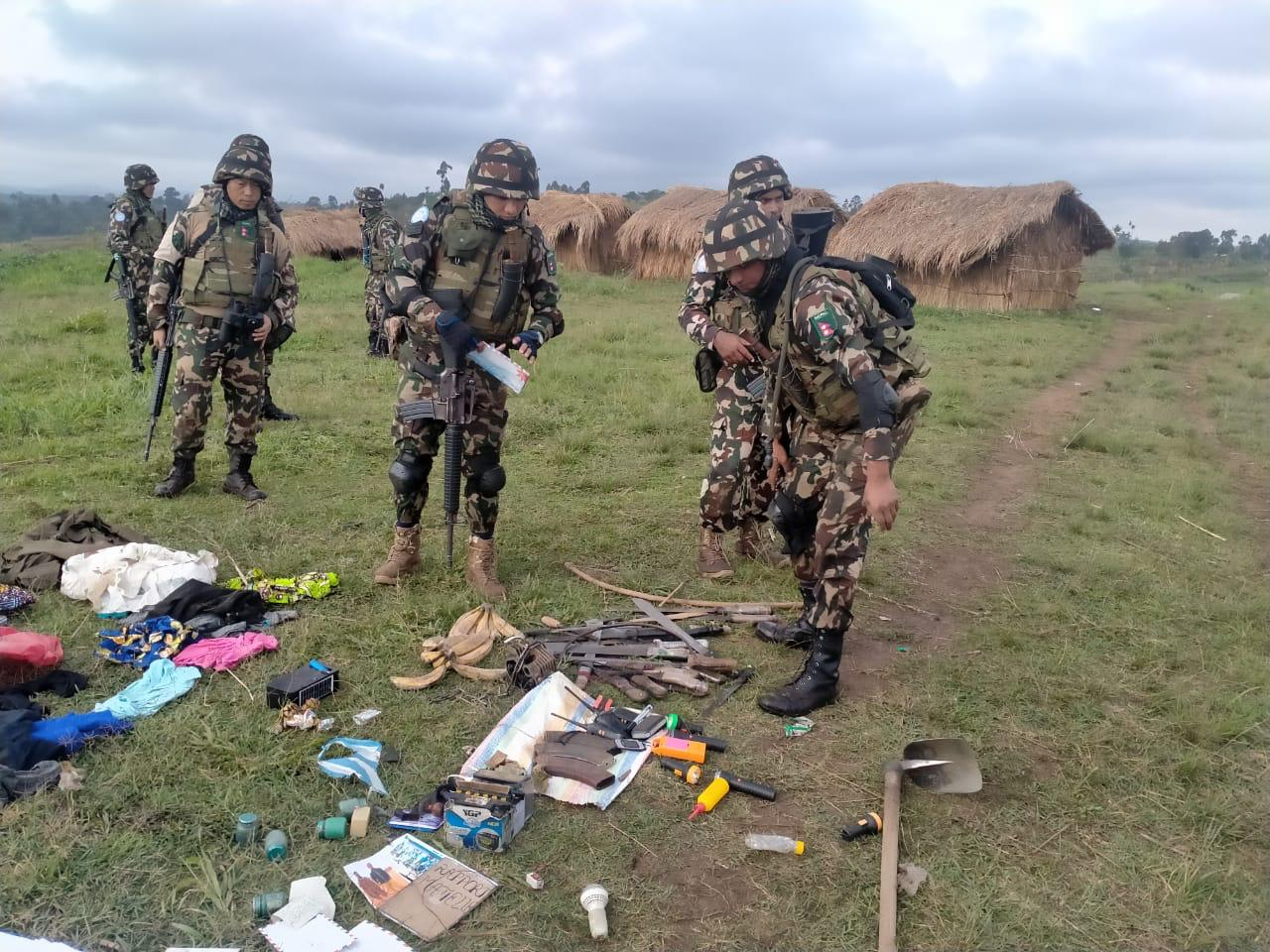
MONUSCO peacekeepers displaying CODECO loot after a battle in Bali, Ituri, on April 12, 2022.

By 2022, the state of siege had been re-established 61 times since its original imposition in May 2021. Despite this state of siege, attacks on civilians increased between May 2021 and March 2022. The number of civilians killed doubled from 559 between June 2020 and March 2021 to 1,261 between June 2021 and March 2022. Inadequate protection by MONUSCO and the FARDC were to blame; CODECO affiliates attacked camps for internally-displaced civilians (almost entirely Hema) several times between November 2021 and February 2022. In a massacre at Tsuya camp on November 21, 2021, 32 civilians were killed by CODECO-URDPC. A week later, 24 civilians were killed at Jangi-Ivo camp by CODECO-URDPC.

One of the deadliest massacres by CODECO was on Plaine Savo refugee camp in February 2022, where 62 people were killed and a further 38 were injured. In the Plaine Savo massacre and the Tsuya and Jangi-Ivo massacres, CODECO affiliates were exacting revenge for Zaïre-FPAC attacks and often attacked villages near the camps as well. Zaïre-FPAC also conducted reprisal attacks and "hunted down Lendus, killing them in retaliation for crimes by CODECO factions and forcing them to leave the area," although this occurred on a smaller scale than CODECO attacks.

Outside of CODECO and militia attacks, the Congolese government was accused of using the state of siege to crack down on civil society and political opposition. Two civil society activists, Elias Bizimungu and King Mwamisyo, were convicted by Congolese military courts and sentenced to prisons in terrible conditions. Bizimungu was pardoned in 2023; Mwamisyo was released in a prison break after the M23 captured Goma in 2025. Many civil society activists who were initially supportive of the state of siege said that over time it began oppressive, especially with the entrance of the Uganda People's Defence Force, East African Community Regional Force (EACRF). However, local leaders in Ituri were supportive of the UPDF's targeting of CODECO alongside the Islamic State – Central Africa Province as part of Operation Shujaa. The first known clash between the UPDF and Lendu militias took place on February 11, 2022, when FARDC and UPDF shot at FPIC fighters stealing cattle.

=== Nairobi process ===
The Nairobi peace process was established in late 2022 to find a peaceful solution to the M23 offensive in North Kivu, along with all other smaller wars in the Kivu regions and Ituri region. The process came alongside the Disarmament, Demobilization, Community Relief and Stabilization Programme (P-DDRCS), established in 2021 and ratified in 2022, which renewed a national effort to bolster peace in the Kivu regions and Ituri. The P-DDRCS' goals for Ituri (Note: Delineated in the "Provincial Operations Plans".) included "conflict resolution and social cohesion," "restoration of state authority and security", community reintegration and recovery, stabilization and socio-economic development, and communication and awareness-building. These goals were officially launched in 2023.

The peace process, when it first talked in November and December 2022, was almost entirely hot air. Zaïre-FPAC did not join, and the Congolese government requested that M23 be excluded. The United Nations, in a June 2023 letter, says "Commitments made with regard to peace or demobilization did not hold, as almost daily attacks and killings were reported as of the time of writing the present report." By 2025, at least 1,000 combatants had laid down their arms, and were reintegrated into life as cattle-farmers as stipulated by the P-DDRCS.

CODECO-URPDC made a name for itself as the most prominent and most violent CODECO splinter by 2023, and its violence had increased into February 2023. In January 2023, CODECO-URDPC killed 17 FARDC soldiers at Ndjala. In one attack on January 8 on Blukwa and several other towns, CODECO-URPDC killed 23. Five days later on January 13, CODECO-URPDC militants killed 49 civilians in the Nyamamba and Mbogi massacres. Several women kidnapped during the attacks were forced into sexual slavery for months afterward. In another attack on the Lala refugee camp in June 2023, CODECO-URPDC killed at least 46 civilians. Despite blaming their own violence on Zaïre-FPAC and the Hema, (Note: CODECO-URPDC blamed all January 2023 attacks on Zaïre-FPAC.) CODECO-URPDC was more violent than Zaïre-FPAC.

By 2023, CODECO-URDPC claimed that all CODECO factions had a delegate at CODECO-URDPC and that it had absorbed all other factions. (Note: All other factions being CODECO-ALC, FDBC, CODECO-Bon Temple, and the previously-unmentioned CODECO-Catholique.) CODECO-URPDC also forged an alliance with the FPIC and what remained of the FPRI in December 2022, forming an organization known as G3. This new organization did not carry out any attacks as of June 2023. Among Hema militias, a splinter faction of Zaïre-FPAC calling themselves the Popular Self-Defense Movement of Ituri broke off from Zaïre-FPAC and expressed their intention to join the Nairobi peace process, which Zaïre-FPAC did not join. Between mid-November 2022 and April 2023, at least 300 civilians were killed by CODECO splinters and Zaïre-FPAC, mainly as tit-for-tat attacks by Lendu and Hema on rival communities. In late 2022 alone, at least 13,000 people were displaced by CODECO attacks.

== M23 and Shujaa involvement ==
=== Convention for the People's Revolution rebellion ===
By late 2023 and early 2024, Zaïre-FPAC began allying itself with the Rwandan-backed March 23 Movement (M23). Prior to this, M23 had little to no involvement in the war in Ituri. This renewed alliance with M23 was spurred by Thomas Lubanga Dyilo, a war criminal and ex-commander of the Hema UPC militia from the 1999-2003 war. Lubanga was released in 2020 by the Tshisekedi government to help spur peace in Ituri; he was kidnapped and held hostage by CODECO for several months in 2022. After being released from CODECO, he fled to Uganda in 2024 and established his home in Kampala as a connection point between M23 and Congo River Alliance officials. Lubanga worked with Yves Mandro Kahwa Panga to conduct these meetings with M23 officials and Hema militias.

Lubanga and Panga enticed Zaïre-FPAC and breakaway faction MAPI to reconcile in Uganda in 2024; MAPI did not rejoin Zaïre-FPAC, but both groups did ally with M23 and pledge to work together. Zaïre-FPAC commanders Logo Marine and Baraka hired ex-UPC commanders to train Zaïre-FPAC militiamen, funded heavily by Lubanga and Panga. Zaïre-FPAC also renamed itself to the Victims of Ituri Communities Self-Defense Group (ADCVI). At least 1,000 ADCVI-MAPI militants were trained by M23 by October 2024. Zaïre-FPAC and MAPI were both alleged to have joined the CRP, but to what extent is unknown.

Another M23 backer who worked alongside Lubanga and Panga in allying Hema groups to M23 was Innocent Kaina, a Congolese Tutsi. In April 2025, Kaina founded the political-military group National Coalition for the Liberation of the Congo (CNLC).

In February 2025, Lubanga's newly established group the Convention for the People's Revolution clashed with Congolese government forces for the first time north of Bunia. In the first attack, the CRP killed 19 civilians. In the second attack, twelve Congolese soldiers were killed and the CRP claimed only one of their militants died. Lubanga said he had three groups of CRP fighters in north Ituri, but did not say where. It was later reported that the CRP is based in Berunda in Djugu territory, a hub of Zaïre-FPAC activity, and occupied some villages on the coast of Lake Albert. Lubanga said that the CRP's military operations are led by former FARDC officer Justin Lobho Zissy.

The CRP posited itself as a popular alliance in Ituri, publishing a leadership platform and assigning roles and representatives. CODECO said that their representatives' signatures were forged and decried the CRP. A Zaïre-FPAC commander, Baraka Maki Amos, pledged allegiance to the Congolese government but maintained ties with Lubanga. Lubanga's M23 and Hema-backing ally Yves Mandro Kahwa Panga said that Lubanga founded the CRP to "glean his share of the pie." By October 2025, the CRP had weakened severely, and the group's vice-president Charles Kakani defected.

In early 2026, the Ugandan government mediated negotiations between the CRP and the Congolese government. Lubanga's primary demand was the removal of Governor Johnny Luboya Nkashama. (Note: According to Lubanga, in early 2025 he received a call from an aide of Felix Tshisekedi. Tshisekedi indirectly asked him why he was "acting this way"; Lubanga said he was discontent with Congolese governance in Ituri and how Luboya was acting. Tshisekedi said Luboya was "not irremovable", but nothing happened to him in the months afterward.) His other demands were the removal of the state of siege, prisoner releases, and an amnesty for CRP militants, similar to CODECO's demands in 2022. The CRP also demanded the withdrawal of the FARDC from the Bule-Fataki and Mabanga-Dhego areas, along with the arrest of pro-government Wazalendo militants who killed civilians.

Between December 2025 and March 2026, at least 40 civilians were killed and 42 injured as a result of the conflict between the CRP and the Congolese government. At least 100,000 people were newly displaced in 2026. Clashes broke out near Pimbo in April between the FARDC and CRP. Only two clashes were documented until June; one in May and one in June. Negotiations stalled after April 2026.

By June 2026, the CRP was the dominant militant group in Ituri. After much of Zaire defected to the group, its size increased from 300 militants in November 2025 to 1,000 by June 2026.

=== Ugandan involvement ===
In 2024, the Congolese-Ugandan joint Operation Shujaa expanded to Ituri, where CODECO was targeted alongside the Allied Democratic Forces. The Ugandan government accused the ADF of entering an alliance with CODECO. When the ADF expanded to Ituri in late 2024, the Ugandan government was keen to use their presence and expansion into Ituri as a way to attack all armed groups attacking civilians. The FARDC hesitated on expanding Shujaa's area of operations, worried that Uganda would again dominate Ituri. Uganda also held negotiations with a commander from an unnamed CODECO faction, but CODECO disavowed this.

Ugandan forces and CODECO clashed in Fataki, Djugu, between March 19 and 20, 2025. The UPDF claimed that 242 CODECO fighters were killed and only one Ugandan soldier was killed. However, in every instance of conflict after Fataki between the UPDF and CODECO, civilians were targeted. The hospital in Fataki could not operate without being threatened by armed groups. The Ugandan troop presence in the DRC increased from 3,000 to 6,000 by the end of 2026, most of these soldiers being stationed in Mahagi and Djugu.

In February and March 2025, the UPDF deployed 1,000 troops to Bunia, Mahagi, and Djugu under the command of the 4th Infantry Division led by Felix Busizoori. Busizoori's command fell outside of Operation Shujaa, and was established to combat CODECO along the shores of Lake Albert. CODECO and Lendu militiamen perceived the deployment, and the UPDF's stated directive of protecting Hema civilians, as a repeat of the Ugandan occupation of Ituri between 1999 and 2003.

Since late 2025, the UPDF has supported the CRP militarily against the FARDC, going so far as to airlift injured CRP fighters to Uganda and let CRP fighters rest in UPDF bases.

The redeployment of FARDC soldiers from Ituri to combat the M23 offensive in late 2024 and early 2025 allowed for militant groups to reposition themselves and conduct more civilian attacks, starting in September 2024. At least 500 civilians were killed between September 2024 and July 2025, most of them in Djugu.

=== CODECO-Zaire conflict ===
In September 2024, at least 50 civilians were killed in that month in and around Gina and Fataki as a result of tit-for-tat attacks between CODECO-URDPC and Zaïre-FPAC. This violence renewed between January and February 2025, killing 150 civilians. Between February 9 and 12, 2025, CODECO militants massacred at least 80 people at the Djaiba IDP site north of Bunia in response to a Zaïre-FPAC attack. On June 28, 2025, leaders from CODECO, the FPRI, FPIC, Zaïre-FPAC, MAPI, and Tchini ya Tuna signed a peace agreement following up on the 2023 peace accord named Aru 1. This 2025 peace accord, called Aru 2, was mediated by MONUSCO and the FARDC. Overall, violence by ethnicized militias like CODECO and Zaire dwindled, and violence by the Allied Democratic Forces increased. This downward trend continued into June 2026.

On January 18, 2026, Tchini ya Tuna killed eight civilians in Irumu. On April 28, CODECO attacked villages near Pimbo, killing upwards of 70 people. In the months following the attack, there was an overall lull in CODECO activity north of Bunia. Elsewhere in Ituri though, several people were killed in a CODECO shooting at a funeral and at a clash between the CRP and FARDC.

The primary reason for the decrease in CODECO activity was due to a weakened Zaïre and improved relations between CODECO and the FARDC.

=== Ebola outbreak ===
Starting on May 14, 2026, an outbreak of Ebola has occurred in Ituri province, with the first case being reported in Mongbwalu. Mongbwalu is a gold mining town that has been at the heart of gold-mining conflicts between CODECO and Zaire. Over 1,000 cases were reported by the end of June 2026, and over 250 people died of Ebola, excluding a suspected 80 more deaths prior to the detection of the outbreak. The chronic insecurity in Ituri due to ten years of war has crippled the medical response to the outbreak, and many people have been unable to receive treatment. War wounded were transferred to Fataki, as the main hospital in Bunia received ebola cases.

Nkashama's failure to respond adequately to the Ebola outbreak forced the Congolese government to dismiss him on June 6, 2026, replacing him with General Kasongo Batoka Mulumba Gaby, who had previously served as the deputy commander of Tshopo.

== Humanitarian impact ==
The exact number of how many people were killed, displaced, or injured in the war between 2017 and 2025 is unknown. The Africa Terrorism Database, part of the African Centre for the Study and Research on Terrorism, said that between 2018 and 2022 1,739 people were killed and 524 injured across 468 attacks. (Note: The AU analysis does not distinguish between civilian and non-civilian casualties. It does say that 65% of attacks were on civilians, though.) Between March 19 and June 26, 2026, at least 632 civilians were killed in North Kivu and Ituri.

=== Casualties ===
At least 7300 civilians have died in Ituri since the start of the conflict in June 2017. Excluding the aforementioned ACSRT study, no comprehensive casualty reports have been conducted in Ituri during the war. There are periods of several months without any data of civilian casualties - April through October 2022 and the latter half of 2018. Additionally, the number of casualties indirectly caused by the war is unknown.

According to Pax For Peace, between December 2017 and August 2018, 496 civilians were killed and 178 more were injured. The organization said that this was an undercount, as they were unable to reach some villages to catalog attacks and casualties. In this time, thousands of people were displaced and several thousand homes were burnt down. Between January 2019 and June 10, 2019, 20 civilians were killed and one was kidnapped according to Governance in Conflict (GiC). Another 523 were killed in July 2019 alone according to GiC and The New Humanitarian. Those same sources also report at least 56 civilians killed between August and September 2019.

MONUSCO reported that between October 2019 and May 31, 2020, 531 civilians were killed in Ituri. Another seventeen were killed by FARDC in the same timeframe. Between June 2020 and June 2021, 559 civilians were killed in Ituri and North Kivu, according to Amnesty International, and the following year between June 2021 and June 2022 1,261 civilians were killed in the two provinces. It is unknown how many of these civilians were killed in Ituri and how many were killed in North Kivu. One Congolese civilian was raped and killed by FARDC in June 2021. At least 300 civilians were killed between mid-November 2022 and April 2023, according to the United Nations Security Council. MSF, citing MONUSCO, said that 1,491 civilians were killed and 422 injured between December 2022 and November 2023, and 841 killed and 252 injured between December 2023 and November 2024.

Another 50 civilians were killed in September 2024 alone, according to the UNSC. Between September 2024 and July 2025, according to the UNSC, 500 civilians were killed. Reuters reported that 200 civilians were killed between January 1, 2025, and June 2025. Between December 2025 and March 2026, the CRP killed at least 40 civilians and injured another 42. In Ituri and North Kivu, 632 civilians were killed between March 19 and June 26, 2026. As with the Amnesty reports, the number of civilians killed in either province is unknown.

Tchini ya Tuna was responsible for the deaths of 17 civilians between October 23 and November 17, 2022, and of eight civilians in January 2026.

==== Combatant casualties ====
Very little is known about combatant casualties at any point in the war. While Congolese and Ugandan governments have reported high death tolls among fighters in certain operations - 309 killed in Operation Zaruba ya Ituri, and 242 killed in 2025 by the UPDF - both of these militaries are known to inflate these numbers. However, it is known about lots of infighting within CODECO splinters and many deaths in CODECO-Zaire and CODECO-FARDC clashes. Almost no casualty reports have emerged from these battles though.

Between December 2017 and August 2018, 32 FARDC soldiers were killed and 46 injured. Between January 2019 and June 10, 2019, 16 were killed and nine were kidnapped. In the entirety of 2020, 172 Congolese soldiers were killed, including 63 in Operation Zaruba ya Ituri. Two Congolese policemen were killed in May 2020. One soldier was killed on November 24, 2021.

On April 5, 2022, a Nepalese peacekeeper named Anil Gurung was killed in battle with CODECO, becoming the first and so far only MONUSCO death since the start of the war. One Ugandan soldier was reported to be killed in 2025 in battle with CODECO.

=== Displacement ===
At the peak of the war in 2020 and 2021, the IOM estimated that 1,777,000 people were displaced in Ituri, 994,800 of whom were returnees. This number is a little over 31% of the entire population of the province. In addition, 3,000,000 people in Ituri were in need of humanitarian aid. The majority of those displaced were in refugee camps in the province, although others had fled to Uganda, North Kivu, and Rwanda. Due to frequent movement among people, people returning home and being forced to flee again, and people moving within camps, it is impossible to determine how many people were displaced and exact increases and decreases in displacement.

The Djugu violence of 2018 displaced at least 100,000 people between January and March. 48,000 of those refugees fled across Lake Albert into Uganda, crammed into refugee camps. At least 1,466 cases of cholera were documented among the migrants, and 32 people had died of it by early March. United Nations-administered refugee programs were struggling to cope with the influx of refugees. By July 2018, the number of refugees in Ituri increased to 710,000. Many civilians who fled to refugee camps within the province found themselves enticed to join militia groups, which were actively recruiting in the camps.

Between January and June 2019, another 360,000 people were displaced, 20,000 towards Bunia. Most of these refugees fled in June during the Bunia massacres. The rest of those displaced people fled to calmer areas in Djugu, Mahagi, and Irumu territories. The main IDP sites within Ituri were Drodro, Rhoe, Bule, Venyo, Kpangba, Telega, Kigonze, Kasenyi, Bembegi, and Ramogi. Drodro was by far the largest IDP camp, and between October and November 2019 82,373 refugees were living in the camps. By the end of 2019, at least 500,000 people were displaced. By February 2020, some estimates suggested more than a million people were displaced.

Amid the escalation of violence in 2020 and 2021 came an escalation in displacement. An estimate in August 2020 suggested 660,000 were displaced since January. 1.6 million people were displaced by October 2020. By December 2020, this was corrected to at least 1.7 million people displaced. The 1.7 million number stayed in use throughout 2021, and one August 2021 report honed in that 1,697,039 people had been displaced in Ituri since 2017. These numbers were highly variable; in one refugee camp at Roe, differing sources in MONUSCO said that between 35,000 and 70,000 people lived at the camp.

By October 2023, the IOM estimated that there were 1,630,535 IDPs and 1,166,597 returnees in the province. The province had the second largest number of IDPs and returnees out of any Congolese province, only under North Kivu. Between January and April 2025, at least 100,000 people were newly displaced, half of whom were children. In 2023, at least 1.3 children in Ituri were not receiving schooling due to being displaced or their schools burned down. In October 2025, the UN estimated that just over 1 million people were displaced in the province. At least 1.15 million people were internally displaced in Ituri as of July 2026. A reason for this decline may be the fall of Goma in January 2025, which forced many displaced people from Ituri and the Kivus to return home. Médecins Sans Frontières reported in 2024 that 1.36 million people were displaced in the province, about 18% of the province's population. They also said that 100,000 had been displaced since the start of 2025, and another 200 killed. As of July 2026, 1.15 million people were living in 69 displacement camps in Ituri, according to the Congolese Minister of Social Affairs Ève Bazaiba.

The New Humanitarian reported that about 1.5 million were displaced, and MONUSCO could only provide protection to 100,000 of these displaced in camps. Despite this, many refugee camps sprang up near MONUSCO bases, hoping for even a shred of defense. Militant groups like Zaire would use refugee camps in Ituri and outside the province as bases for recruitment, often leading to reprisal attacks by CODECO, who brutally targeted displacement camps at Lala, Plaine Savo, and Djaiba between 2021 and 2026.

=== Sexual violence ===
Every group involved in the war, at some point, has raped and sexually assaulted civilian women. The dominant target of CODECO and CODECO-affiliated group rapes were Hema and Alur women; for Zaire and Hema-dominated groups, along with the FARDC, Lendu women were targeted more often. However, no group exclusively targeted a certain ethnicity, and rape was often used as a means of reprisal for attacks. The vast majority of these rapes went unpunished, and the few cases where any arrests took place was within FARDC ranks. (Note: Two soldiers arrested in 2022 were caught in the act. It's unclear what happened after the arrests.) Even then, as FARDC commander Tipu Zero Zero said about his troops after they raped dozens of women, "his troops were “tempted” since they had no women with them, and that the population therefore had to be careful, but he also spoke to his troops."

CODECO affiliates have abducted women on multiple occasions and have forced them into sexual slavery, with many of these women being gang-raped by CODECO fighters for days and weeks on end. Cases of Lendu women raped by Zaire militants were documented less than those of Hema women raped by CODECO, as many Hema live in displacement camps checked routinely by MONUSCO and Lendu women don't.

The exact amount of women killed immediately after rape, that die of their rape-related injuries including childbirth, or commit suicide as a result of the mental and physical trauma as a result of the rape is unknown. CODECO militants often killed women after raping them to avoid repercussions, as traditional Lendu beliefs forbid rape. One Congolese civilian was raped and killed by FARDC in June 2021. Many rape victims often stay silent during and after the rape in fear of being killed; as MSF puts it "They don’t have any physical injuries because they have to let it happen to stay alive." Many women who are raped are left with severe mental trauma, incontinence, sexually-transmitted diseases, and a variety of other ailments.

One group established during the First Ituri war, SOFEPADI, works in Bunia with victims of sexual violence in the province. In 2019, they treated 1,305 rape victims. Half of the victims were internally displaced. At least 300 rape cases were documented in the province between January and December 2025. Six were reported in January 2026. Between January and February 2023, a climax of violence, MSF was treating 13 new sexual violence cases every week. The number of women who were raped is likely much higher, due to chronic underreporting for fear of reprisals, stigmatization, and inadequate healthcare. In 2018 alone, nine of every ten women arriving into Uganda from the Congo, which included people who made the treacherous journey through Ituri from North and South Kivu, had been raped. Additionally, many victims of rape and sexual violence are children.

In December 2025, civil society organizations launched the 16 Days of Activism protests, which called on the justice system to punish rapists and bring awareness to the vast amount of sexual violence in the province. There is only one competent court in the province, located in Bunia, and only 9% of sexual violence victims decide to get a medical certificate that would enable them to seek legal action against their rapist. In times when hospitals are attacked, which is not uncommon, (Note: Drodro General Hospital had been attacked four times since the start of the war in 2017, including two attacks in a two month period in 2023. Other hospitals like Fataki, Bunia, Bule, Gina, and Mahagi were attacked as well.) many rape victims seeking help flee the hospital and do not return. When hospitals are attacked, hundreds of thousands of civilians are left without medical care for months on end, and many smaller medical centers throughout the province have closed permanently as a result of the war.

== Illicit activities and funding ==
The primary source of funding for armed groups in Ituri Province is gold-mining. Each armed group controls mines and taxes miners on gold output in exchange for protection. The main gold mining areas are Mongbwalu and Banyani-Kilo, although hundreds of smaller, often locally-run and unregulated gold mines exist. Almost all of Ituri's gold is smuggled out of the country. Since colonial times, the main export of Ituri and stimulant of its economy was gold, which the entire economy was based around. The FPRI, in its insurgency between 2006 and 2017, did control some gold mines in Ituri as a source of revenue. Gold was also a dominant source of conflict in the first war.

In 2024, the United Nations estimated that gold mining in Ituri generated at least $140 million a year to armed groups in the province. The vast majority of the gold generated in the province is undeclared, mainly because the government cannot access mines controlled by armed groups. The majority of gold mining sites in the province are under armed group control despite mining cooperatives and foreign companies paying FARDC and PNC for protection. Even in areas with state support, foreign mining companies mine recklessly and threaten the environment, including the UNESCO World Heritage Site Okapi Wildlife Reserve.

=== Taxation and control of gold mines ===
At gold mines, militants from CODECO factions, Zaire, and the FARDC would tax gold miners a portion of their gold in exchange for protection from attacks by other armed groups. Often these protection schemes would be on an ethnic basis; CODECO would protect Lendu miners and Zaire would protect Hema, for example. Mongbwalu was the most lucrative site, producing up to 50 kg of gold weekly. The majority of gold sold in Bunia, from where it reached the rest of the world, came from Mongbwalu. By June 2020, Mongbwalu became the dominant hotspot of gold-related conflicts, with seventeen attacks on miners reported in July 2020 alone. About 5,000 CODECO fighters who were formerly artisanal miners arrived at Mongbwalu between June 2020 and January 2021, adding to an existing population of 15,000 to 20,000 miners at Mongbwalu. The CODECO-URDPC and FDBC dispatched 2,000 more fighters to Mongbwalu in January 2021, occupying an exclusion zone owned by the company Mongbwalu Gold Mines until they were pushed out by FARDC and PNC in mid-February.

In CODECO-ran Mongbwalu mines, miners who did not give up their gold would be attacked by CODECO. The money that CODECO received often went to CODECO-allied businessman Ndele Bachebandey, who paid for CODECO-URDPC militants to act as security at the Kpangba gold mine throughout 2020 and 2021. At other times, gold from Mongbwalu would be sold to traders at Iga-Barriere, Bunia, and Kampala. Yake Byahuranga was named by the United Nations as a goldsmith who exported melted gold from Mongbwalu to be sold in Uganda. Constantin Malo Lombela Ndjelo, Banga Ndjelo, and Exodus Dhena Kondo Adelard were also involved in transporting Mongbwalu gold to Uganda, where it would be sold in Dubai. Uganda's gold exports were up 29% from 2019 due to the illegal gold trade from Ituri.

By 2022, more militant groups became entrenched in the gold mining economy. Both CODECO-URDPC and Zaire said that gold-mining was a priority for those groups; Zaire commander Zawadi Vajeru was a former gold miner himself. Even as the conflicts over gold-mining in Mongbwalu flared up that year, declared and undeclared production skyrocketed. The officially declared gold production for Mongbwalu in 2021 was 406.28 grams, although undeclared production at one of 40 mines in the vicinity produced 120 grams per week. (Note: In USD as of July 2026, 406.28 grams was about $52,532. If weekly production was consistently at 120 grams ($15,507), the undeclared yearly production at that one mine would be $806,364.)

In 2024, the declared production was 1,800 grams of gold, although by the middle of 2024 two Congolese government agencies reported that 17 kilograms of gold had been mined and 24 kilograms had been sold, over 22 times the declared amount.

The FARDC claimed that they were stationed at mines to protect miners and did not conduct attacks, but they also did provide security to unidentified companies in 2019 and 2020. By 2021, FARDC commander Tipu Zero Zero and his men in the 312th Battalion were accused of staging attacks on miners and operating just like CODECO at Mongbwalu. FARDC commander Charles Muhinda Santos, who led the 13011th and 13012th Battalions of the 1301st Regiment was identified as the dominant FARDC mafioso in Mongbwalu, and taxed miners 30-50% of their gold in exchange for protection. Santos denied his involvement in the illicit gold trade.

Zaire did not become proactive in its gold mining attacks until 2022, and one ex-combatant said he was taxed 15% of the gold he mined. If a miner didn't pay, he would be punished. Zaire commander Pharaon Fidele Babala personally controlled Zaire's gold mining operations and mined for gold himself. The militia collaborated with local Hema leaders Wawa and Chief Unyagi Ndikpa, who in exchange received part of the profits. By 2024, Baraka Amos Maki controlled Zaire's gold mining activities, generating $1.6 million a month in gold alone. The CODECO commander at that time was named "50 Cent". Maki's fees on gold were $3,000 a month, and he would forcibly enslave businessmen and miners in Mabanga who couldn't pay up. (Note: This practice was called "salongo".) His top customers were Raphael Mambo Kamaragi, Aime Mbanga, and Robert Ucaya, all major businessmen in Bunia. Maki also laundered his profits in two hotels in Bunia.

CODECO commander Samuel Kadogo controlled all of his group's mining activities including Mongbwalu and Banyani Kilo, while Zaire commander Baraki Amos Maki controlled all mines in Mambisa. Congolese officials, including Floribert Ndjabu and two provincial parliament members Joachim Kambale Ngendu, Jean Batchu Ngbadhe, Serge Lokena Mbukana and Djokaba Lambi Bede paid CODECO $10,000 a month to protect gold mines in Banyani Kilo owned by the parliamentarians. Fees like what the parliamentarians paid were often issued discriminately based on ethnicity; Lendu businessmen paid $17,000 for one-off payments, and non-Lendu businessmen paid $30,000. A man named Tchenji, based in Nzebi, succeeded Exodus Adelard as the main exporter of gold from Mongbwalu and Nzebi.

Amid the Ugandan deployment in 2025, despite saying they intervened to protect the Hema, Ugandan interests were centered around the exploitation of gold in the province. Similar exploitation occurred when Ugandan troops first intervened against ADF in the province in 2021 in Operation Shujaa. Much of the gold smuggled out of Ituri and into Uganda was used to purchase goods from Uganda. The largest trader was Bassa Ndroza; he was the main exporter of gold from Djugu and Mahagi, and the main importer of Ugandan palm oil and rice into Ituri. The sole official comptoir of Bunia, co-owned by Banga Ndjelo and Edmond Kasereka, worked with Ugandan businessmen and gold traders in Butembo to illegally export Iturian gold to Uganda. This gold was transferred via the Aru and Mahagi crossings and the Butembo-Kasindi routes. Gold traders based in Arua would "officialize" the gold from Ituri, significantly inflating the gold exports of Uganda. Uganda reported 62 tons of gold production in 2025, totaling $6.4 billion, a 30% increase since 2024. This increase is directly attributable to gold smuggling from Ituri.

Between 2024 and 2026, semi-mechanized alluvial mining operations in Djugu intensified as gold boomed. The United Nations estimated in 2026 that between March 2024 and March 2026, minimum production in Djugu was four to six tons of gold, worth between $300 and $800 million. Despite at least a dozen tons of gold being reported across the province in 2025 alone, official production was at 559 kg. In some areas, cyanide-leaching methods were used to extract gold, which severely damages the environment and is illegal under Congolese law.

=== Attacks on gold mines by militant groups ===
CODECO, and after 2020 it's splinters, began attacking gold mines in Ituri province at an increasing pace in late 2019. Around this time, Zaire militants were present in these mines but were not conducting attacks on other gold mines. Digene, a mine in Banyani Kilo, was one of the first locations to be consistently attacked, being targeted on February 28 and October 4, 2020 by suspected CODECO militants.

Between 2021 and 2022, the gold mining economy became more violent as Zaire entered the scene and CODECO-URDPC dug into its positions at gold mines. Zaire controlled the mines of Pilipili, Pluto, Lodjo, and Dala, earning hundreds of thousands of dollars in gold annually. CODECO factions URDPC, Bon Temple, and the FDBC entrenched themselves in Mongbwalu, bisecting the town and sparking increasingly-violent attacks on miners affiliated with Zaire, CODECO, and unaffiliated with any groups. By 2023, CODECO was also resorting to kidnapping miners and collecting ransom as well as contributions from Lendu community members to finance themselves. Gold profits would go to weaponry.

In 2025, clashes broke out between militants in CODECO's 4th Brigade led by General Lango. Lango and thirteen militants were killed in this battle. Around this time, CODECO also dislodged Zaire militants from Mongbwalu and Banyani Kilo, and the overwhelming majority of gold mines in this region.

By 2026, FARDC cracked down more intensely on gold mining in the province, particularly in Iga-Barriere, Mabanga, and Nizi, in an effort to curb Zaire and the CRP. Areas that were under Zaire influence were more harshly targeted than areas under CODECO influence.

=== Checkpoints and forced taxation ===
In the earlier years of the conflict, CODECO and Zaire would set up checkpoints along key roads and impose fines for travelers. Zaire and FPIC were enacting checkpoints as early as 2020. If a targeted ethnicity passed through one of these checkpoints, as with the case of two Bira businessmen and a Lendu employee at a Zaire checkpoint in 2020, the travelers would be killed. In 2021, some Zaire roadblocks were meters away from FARDC bases. The FRPI also began imposing checkpoints in 2022 on the road between Bunia and Gety.

Communities that did not pay the armed group in control of them tax money would often be killed or attacked.

== Actors ==
Throughout the nearly ten-year long war, a number of different groups have formed and dissolved fighting the Congolese government, civilians, and within themselves. For many civilian attacks, especially in the early years of the war and the 2018 Djugu violence, identifying perpetrators has been difficult.In the early stages of the war, ragtag Lendu militias were the dominant non-state actor conducting attacks on civilians and the FARDC.

Chiefdoms in Ituri can be delineated by their name; Lendu chiefdoms start with Walendu, and Hema chiefdoms start with Bahema. The Walendu areas are Walendu Pitsi, Walendu Tatsi, and Walendu Djatsi. The Hema areas are Bahema Badjere, Bahema Nord, and Bahema Banywagi. These areas are all located in Djugu territory. Throughout the course of the war, the conflict has expanded into Irumu Territory and Mahagi Territory. Walendu and Bahema chiefdoms are not composed entirely of Hema or Lendu. In areas like Mahagi and Irumu, along with parts of Djugu, communities of Bira, Gegere, and Alur live alongside the Hema and Lendu. The Alur and Gegere have been targeted alongside the Hema, and some Bira have formed the FPIC and ally with the Lendu.

=== Groups ===
At least eight named CODECO factions have taken part in the war - the URPDC, the ALC, the ARDPC, Bon Temple, the FDBC, Catholic, and Islamic, along with Ngudjolo's unified group. Most of these factions have since coalesced into CODECO-URDPC by way of destruction, like Bon Temple, or by alliance. By 2026, CODECO-URDPC was the main CODECO affiliate conducting attacks, and they claimed to have 10,000 to 40,000 members, although this number was given by CODECO-URPDC. The other CODECO groups, at various points in their lifetimes, had a total of around 1,000 fighters. (Note: CODECO-ARDPC had 135 fighters in 2020, and was down to 71 by 2021. CODECO-Bon Temple had between 400 and 800 until its destruction in January 2021; most of these fighters joined the FDBC or CODECO-URPDC. CODECO-ALC had 200 fighters in 2020. It is worth noting that these numbers come from 2020 and 2021, when CODECO was the most splintered, and many of these fighters have likely joined CODECO-URDPC or other groups.) CODECO's first reiteration, under Justin Ngudjolo in 2019, had 2,350 fighters. The amount of Lendu civilians who fought in community militias between 2017 and 2019, or civilians that have joined and since defected from CODECO factions, is unknown.

Other armed groups allied with CODECO, like the Bira-majority FPIC, had about 4,500 fighters in 2022. A majority of these fighters split off into FPIC-Chambre Noire-Sanduku in 2022. No exact numbers have been given for the FPIC's size since the split, nor have there been any sizes given for other smaller groups like Tchini ya Tuna, Gutsi group, and Mai-Mai Sambaza.

The size of Hema militias was unknown throughout the 2018 violence, although Lendu militias had more fighters. In 2025, after allying with the Congo River Alliance and M23, Zaïre-FPAC was estimated to have between 2,500 and 3,000 fighters. The number of fighters MAPI has is unknown, but likely number in the several hundreds. The number of fighters that Thomas Lubanga's CPR or Innocent Kaina's CNLC has is also unknown.

The Congolese government's troop count between 2017 and 2019 is unknown, although they deployed 20,000 fighters to Ituri in 2019 for Operation Zaruba ya Ituri. At least 15,000 soldiers were present in 2021, and even less are present today due to the M23 campaign in the Kivus drawing Congolese forces away from Ituri. MONUSCO had 18,316 peacekeepers in Ituri prior to joining FARDC against the militias in 2020. The UPDF initially joined the war in 2025 with 1,000 soldiers, but had increased their deployment to 6,000 by the end of the year.
