= List of factions in the Ituri war (2017-present) =

This is a list of factions of the Ituri war (2017-present). Throughout the nearly ten-year long war, a number of different groups have formed and dissolved fighting the Congolese government, civilians, and within themselves. For many civilian attacks, especially in the early years of the war and the 2018 Djugu violence, identifying perpetrators has been difficult. In the early stages of the war, ragtag Lendu militias were the dominant non-state actor conducting attacks on civilians and the FARDC.

Chiefdoms in Ituri can be delineated by their name; Lendu chiefdoms start with Walendu, and Hema chiefdoms start with Bahema. The Walendu areas are Walendu Pitsi, Walendu Tatsi, and Walendu Djatsi. The Hema areas are Bahema Badjere, Bahema Nord, and Bahema Banywagi. These areas are all located in Djugu territory. Throughout the course of the war, the conflict has expanded into Irumu Territory and Mahagi Territory. Walendu and Bahema chiefdoms are not composed entirely of Hema or Lendu. In areas like Mahagi and Irumu, along with parts of Djugu, communities of Bira, Gegere, and Alur live alongside the Hema and Lendu. The Alur and Gegere have been targeted alongside the Hema, and some Bira have formed the FPIC and ally with the Lendu.

== Lendu and Hema militias ==
The primary driver of the 2018 violence against the Hema were coordinated community-based militias of Lendu. These militias came from Walendu Pitsi and Walendu Djatsi, and many Lendu were spurred to action by hate speech publicly called for by prominent Lendu local leaders. While CODECO militants during this time may have participated in these attacks, the group did not start claiming attacks against civilians and actively clashing with the Congolese government until August 2018. Hema militias did not mobilize to the same extent as Lendu militias did, and were more often than not on the receiving end of attacks.

A primary leader of Hema mobilization during the Djugu violence was Yves Kahwa Mandro Panga, a former UPC commander. Two other Lendu and Hema elites, Longbe Tchabi Linga and Pilo Kamaragi Mulindro, an ex-FNI militant and chief of Walendu Pitsi and ex-UPC militant and chief of Bahema Nord respectively, were accused of publicly calling for peace but stoking tensions privately. The group of people that sought peace the most were businessmen on both sides, as communal war was hurtful to their business.

Since late 2019, the main Lendu-majority militia has been CODECO (and since 2020, its affiliates). However, as militias formed, traditional impromptu militias like those that conducted the 2018 attacks dissipated. Lendu civilians have often been the target of attacks by CODECO splinters, as have Hema civilians with Zaïre-FPAC and Bira civilians with the FPIC.

== CODECO and splinters ==
=== Unified CODECO ===
CODECO (Note: In French, Coopérative pour le développement du Congo.) emerged in the conflict in August 2018 as an instigator of violence, although had been active in training Lendu youth since June 2017. Its first leaders were Mukwake Mambo and Lokana Mambo, both former Nationalist and Integrationist Front (FNI) members. Much of CODECO's early cadre was ex-FNI. Little to no Patriotic Resistance Front of Ituri (FPRI) militiamen fought alongside CODECO in the early stages of the war. CODECO utilized mystical potions and amulets called dawa to help them in battle. After Mukwake Mambo's death in 2018, Justin Ngudjolo took over control of the group, which had about 2,350 members in June 2019. The Congolese government and other groups in Ituri, including Lendu civil society figures opposed to CODECO, called Ngudjolo's CODECO the "Ngudjolo armed group."

After Ngudjolo's death by Congolese forces in March 2020, and the arrest of two of his lieutenants, CODECO splintered into several different groups. By late 2020, between 10 and 20 Lendu militias were present in the province. There have been attempts to reunify CODECO into one singular group again, but this has come in the form of alliances by CODECO groups that does not include them all. CODECO, when used as a singular term, refers to any or all CODECO groups colloquially.

=== Union of Revolutionaries for the Defense of the Congolese People (URPDC / CODECO-URPDC) ===
The Union of Revolutionaries for the Defense of the Congolese People (Note: In French, Union des révolutionnaires pour la défense du peuple Congolais.) (URPDC) formed in 2018 at the same time as CODECO, but for its first two years rejected any affiliation with CODECO. In 2020, it rejected the moniker "Ngudjolo armed group". The URPDC quickly became one of the largest and most influential Lendu militias after Ngudjolo's death, and became referred to as a CODECO splinter. Charite Nguna Kiza succeeded Ngudjolo as de facto CODECO commander. The group's spokesperson, Basa Zukpa Guershom, (Note: Also spelled Bassa Zukpa Guersom.) has become the de facto spokesperson for all CODECO militias and as of 2025, was one of the most influential people in CODECO-URDPC. He became president of the group in 2026, and announced that the group wanted to become a political party. The defense commander, or defense chief of staff, Desire Londroma, (Note: Also referred to as Desire Londroma Njukpa, or Desire Lokana Lokanza.) has also remained at his post since 2020.

Between 2020 and 2026, URDPC has established several "brigades" under its control that conducts attacks and controls gold-mining, illegal taxation, and other illicit activities. As of 2025, Kiza is the commander of the first brigade, which also serves as CODECO-URPDC's headquarters. The headquarters of the first brigade (and of the group as a whole), as of 2025, is in Dyaro, Dhendo group, in Walendu Pitsi. In 2020, the group's headquarters was in Ndalo and Lodjo, in Walendu Pitsi. The second brigade's commander is Maki Kasongo, who tightly controls CODECO-URPDC's gold mining operations. The third brigade's commander is named Alfred, and Maki is his deputy. (Note: Verbatim from the U.N., "Alfred, with Maki (from Landjo) acting as his deputy".) The fourth brigade's commander is Rehema. His predecessor, Lango, was killed in 2024 in intra-URDPC clashes. The fifth brigade commander is Logo Delo, and his deputy is Agenong'a Maneno. The sixth brigade commander is Songe.

The URDPC in 2023 claimed to have absorbed all other factions and be the dominant faction of CODECO. The group allied with the FPIC and FDBC, and called themselves a new group dubbed G3.

The URPDC follows the same cultish rituals as Ngudjolo's CODECO, and mixes Christianity, animism, and worships Ngudjolo. Not all Lendu or CODECO splinters follow these rituals.

=== Congo Liberation Army (ALC / CODECO-ALC) ===
The origins of CODECO-ALC (Note: In French, Armée de libération du Congo.) is not known. In July 2020, it became the first CODECO faction to sign a unilateral ceasefire with the Congolese government. Its leader was Justin Maki Gesi, also known as Mountain Wolf, until his death in the October 2020 Ituri offensive. In September 2020, the group broke the ceasefire and marched into Bunia with around 200 soldiers, including child soldiers, and demanded the release of their compatriots from prison. In October 2020, Congolese forces seized the ALC headquarters of Ezekere in Irumu Territory, although most of the group's operations took place in Walendu Tatsi. After brief clashes in early November 2020, the group re-committed to a ceasefire.

Like other CODECO factions, the ALC collected taxes through gold mining operations and illegal checkpoints. In 2021, the group might have forged an alliance with the FPIC, FRPI dissidents, and CODECO-Bon Temple. In 2023, ALC had reportedly forged an alliance with CODECO-URDPC, where militants from both groups carried out the Nyamamba and Mbogi massacres.

=== Revolutionary Army for the Defense of the Congolese People (ARDPC / CODECO-ARDPC) ===
The ARDPC (Note: In French, Armée des révolutionnaires pour la défense du peuple Congolais.) originally split off from the URDPC in January 2020, claiming that they disagreed with the URDPC's killing of civilians. The URDPC confirmed the split but said that the ARDPC was conducting the killings. The ARDPC was first led by Olivier Ngabu Ngawi, who was the first to proclaim himself the successor of Justin Ngudjolo in May 2020. The ARDPC in 2020 had a sub-commander named Rr'dja Kpalo Deogratace. The ARDPC was headquartered in Ala, Walendu Pitsi, until they were chased out of Ala by CODECO-URDPC in December 2020. After leaving Ala, the ARDPC was headquartered in Sanduku, just a few meters from a FARDC base.

By 2021, the ARDPC had dwindled from 135 members in 2020 to about 71, with many men leaving due to hunger. Around this time, they only had five AKs, two rocket launchers, and two PKMs. Like other CODECO factions, the ARDPC routinely conducted attacks with bows and arrows and machetes. The group increasingly collaborated with the FARDC, looting civilian villages, and at one point demanded payment from the FARDC in helping "neutralize CODECO". The status of the ARDPC after 2021 is unclear.

=== Bon Temple de Dieu (Bon Temple / CODECO-Bon Temple) ===
The origin of the Bon Temple faction is unknown, although it may have split off from URDPC. It was founded by someone named Tuwo, whose origins vary wildly depending on source but is widely regarded to be a hunter. In 2020, the group operated in southwestern Djugu territory's Banyani Kilo area, and was headquartered in Nyangaray with positions in Ngoto and Ritsi. The group had between 400 and 800 fighters until January 2021. In January 2021, the FDBC attacked Nyangaray and Ngoto, dislodging the Bon Temple faction from those areas and burning another ten villages. The FDBC attacked Bon Temple due to the group's refusal to join the peace process and also Bon Temple's killings of Lendu civilians. A leader of Bon Temple named Butsoro was killed in the clashes; Tuwo himself was killed by the FDBC in May 2021. His successor, "General" Kadogo, joined the URDPC and became the commander for Nyangaray.

During its short lifespan as a militia, Bon Temple was notorious for its sexual violence. In an attack on Bunzenzele in July 2020, Tuwo personally commanded and planned out the destruction of many homes and the rape and kidnapping of women. Many of the victims were Hema, although some were Nyali, Mubira, and Lendu. Several of the victims were children. Almost all of the women interviewed by MONUSCO described the rapes and captivity as torture. Bon Temple also levied illegal taxes on gold mining operations in Banyani Kilo.

=== Defense Forces Against the Balkanization of the Congo (FDBC) ===
In 2020, the FDBC (Note: In French, Forces de défense contre la balkanization du Congo.) was led by Chui Mutambala, with Awilo Nichunga as deputy chief of staff. The spokesperson for the group was Stalone Beby. The FDBC operated in Walendu Djatsi. The FDBC operates closely with CODECO-URDPC, at times even clashing with Hema and Zaïre-FPAC militants alongside URDPC. The main attack claimed by the FDBC was the battle of Nyangaray in 2021 that effectively ended CODECO-Bon Temple. Since mid-2021, the FDBC has had an alliance with CODECO-URDPC, and the two groups work together in imposing taxes on civilians, profiting off illicit gold mining activities in Mongbwalu, and the raping and killing of civilians.

=== Other CODECO factions ===
Two other named CODECO factions are known to exist; CODECO-Catholique, which was reported to have a delegate at the CODECO-URPDC headquarters and operated under URPDC in 2023, and CODECO-Islamique, which included the Koba and Nyangaruhi groupings. CODECO-Islamique was dubbed an informal faction that incorporated Quranic teachings and preachers affiliated with the Allied Democratic Forces. In late 2020, six to ten CODECO splinters were operating.

== CODECO-affiliated factions ==
=== Patriotic and Integrationist Front of the Congo (FPIC / Chini ya Kilima) ===
The FPIC, (Note: In French, Force patriotique et integrationniste du Congo.) also called Chini ya Kilima after the area it was founded, is a predominantly Bira militia founded in 2020 against alleged Hema encroachment onto their land and lack of representation in Ituri and national politics. In 2020, the group was active around southwest Ituri in Marabho and Nyakunde, both gold mining areas. It has also been active in the northwest in Mwanga, Kunda, Walu, and Balazana along RN27. The group initially targeted FARDC, but began killing non-Bira civilians, mainly Hemas after May 2020. It had about 4,500 men by 2022, and most of those lived at its headquarters at Nyankunde.

As early as 2020, the FPIC was collaborating with CODECO-Bon Temple. It later became apparent that FPIC was collaborating with FPRI dissidents, CODECO-ALC, and CODECO-Bon Temple. An alliance between the FPIC, CODECO-UDRPC, and FDBC began in mid-2021 and involved the groups sharing ammunition, resources, and intelligence. In December 2022, FPIC officially formed an alliance with the CODECO-URDPC and FPRI, calling this alliance G3. This alliance was designed to streamline negotiations in the Nairobi peace process, and did not carry out military attacks. Weapons and ammunition came from various sources; a General Kadogo within URDPC, some FARDC soldiers, and gold mining revenue, although the most originated from the Second Congo War.

The failed 2018 presidential candidate for the party United Congolese for Change, Radjabho Tababho Soborabo, was one of the co-founders of the FPIC. By 2021, Songambele Selyabo became the overall leader and chief of staff, and has remained in this position since. In 2022, Kaleb Bule was deputy commander, and Colonel Nzete was in charge of logistics, chief financier and procurer of ammunition. General Billy was an operational commander. General Kakishe commanded Walu, Mwenga, and Kunda while General Dacha commanded Komanda, Marabho, Nyankunde, and all the way up to Bunia.

While the FPIC was a Bira-dominated militia and demanded loyalty from the Bira, the group would assassinate Bira civilians that spoke out or defected from the group. Defectors from the FPIC said that young Bira men between the ages of 20 and 35 were forced to fight in the FPIC, although the group used child soldiers as young as 12 since its inception. By 2021, the FPIC was one of the most active armed groups in Irumu. The late 2020 attack by FPIC on Irumu town displaced the population for months afterward. In September 2021, the FPIC clashed with the Allied Democratic Forces (ADF) near Komanda. The FARDC accused the FPIC and ADF of being in an alliance around this time; FPIC rejected the accusations saying that they instead clashed with the ADF only after FARDC had fled the area. The ADF called the FPIC an "infidel Christian militia". In May 2022, the FPIC carried out an attack on a Chinese mining convoy guarded by the FARDC.

==== Chambre Noire-Sanduku (FPIC-Chambre Noire-Sanduku / FPIC-CNS) ====
There was a leadership dispute in 2023, when Selyabo was forced to step down and Tondabo Erabo, also known as General Herode, was to take over. Armed clashes broke out between pro-Selyabo and pro-Herode groups, and Selyabo's fighters retreated to Mwenga and Sulasula while Herode's fighters retreated to Nyakunde. Herode's fighters constituted the majority of the FPIC, and he renamed his group FPIC Chambre noire-sanduku. Herode said his new group sought the return of FARDC and state authority, and both FARDC and MONUSCO were no longer attacked by FPIC-CNS. Selyabo told Congolese authorities and MONUSCO to disregard FPIC-CNS.

=== Gutsi group ===
The Gutsi group was identified as a CODECO splinter in 2020, and was led by Ndrodza Konaju Germain, and someone named Dhena Bura signed a 2020 ceasefire for the Gutsi group. The United Nations referred to the militia as Gutsi group because it operated in the Gutsi area of Walendu Djatsi, west of Djugu towards Mongbwalu. The group was independent of CODECO-URDPC. The Gutsi group was the only militia to have delineated that the end of hostilities with its peace agreement also meant the end of civilian attacks.

=== Tchini ya Tuna ===
Little is known about when Tchini ya Tuna was founded or who its leaders are. Its first mention as an armed group is in late 2022. It is active in Walese Vonkutu chiefdom, particularly the town of Balingina. In January 2024, both Tchini ya Tuna and Mai-Mai Kabidon agreed to a peace agreement and the return of civilians to 65 villages. In July 2025, it signed the Aru 2 peace agreement. A month later in Balingina, 50 Tchini ya Tuna militiamen laid down their arms. It is considered a Ngiti militia.

Tchini ya Tuna demanded to access the fields of civilians living near it in the towns of Mambedy and Balingina, and often would kill and kidnap civilians that did not adhere to their rules. Between October 23 and November 17, 2022, 23 civilians were killed by Tchini ya Tuna. In January 2026, Tchini ya Tuna militiamen kidnapped and executed eight civilians in Balingina.

=== Mai-Mai Sambaza ===
Sambaza, was originally considered by survivors interviewed by The New Humanitarian as several hundred disaffected CODECO fighters who rejected Ngawi's proclaimed leadership. It had split off from CODECO in November 2019, and colloquially became Mai-Mai Sambaza. Sambaza may have been based in Kpandroma. In February 2021, the group set fire to a health facility in Djugu.

== Hema-dominated militias ==
=== Zaïre-FPAC (Zaïre / ADCVI) ===
Zaïre-FPAC, full name Popular Front for the Self-Defense of the Congo, (Note: In French, Front populaire d'autodefense du Congo) colloquially called Zaïre or Zaïrois and since 2024 the Victims of Ituri Communities' Self-Defense Group (ADCVI), emerged in 2020 as a response to CODECO and its splinters. While Zaïre is a Hema-majority organization, it includes militiamen from Alur, Ndo Okebo, Mambisa, and Nyali communities. These five communities are known as the G5. As early as 2021, former combatants in the Union of Congolese Patriots (UPC) from the Second Congo War were joining and training Zaïre fighters. Since 2024, the group has been part of the Congo River Alliance.

In 2020, the group was based in Dala, Mongbwalu, Iga-Barriere, and Mbijo in Djugu, Berunda in Mahagi, and Shari in Irumu territory in 2020. By 2021, their area of operations expanded to Sota in Ituri and Dhego in Djugu. Their expansion to Sota was spurred by the FPIC attack on Irumu. The group is structured around four factions: Zaïre-K, Zaïre-Malayika, Zaïre-Mazembe, and Zaïre-Djamaique, all of which operate in different areas and kill civilians. By 2023, Zaïre-K controlled Mabanga, Dala, Mbidjo, Pluto, Yedi, Gelé,Lenga, Lodjo, and Kilo. Zaïre-Malayika controlled Iga Barrière, Lopa, Gina, Largu, Bule, Katoto, Nizi, Kilo, Mongwalu, Largu, Tchomia, and central Soleniama. Zaïre-Mazembe controlled Nioka, Berunda, and Kandoyi, while Zaïre-Djamaique controlled Shari/Irumu, Nderembi, Kabarole, RN4, the Kasenyi route, and as far as Boga.

Initially, the organization of Zaïre was opaque along with its leadership. Zawadi Vajeru was considered to be the Zaïrian leader as early as 2020, and remains in that position to this day. Prior to being a militia leader, Zawadi was an artisanal gold miner and controlled the Nyaka mine. His deputy commander was Logo Marine Mugenyi, who succeeded someone named Tchotum between 2020 and 2021. Babala Fidele Castro Ngabu was appointed to command Mongbwalu in 2022, after being arrested in 2021 by FARDC and released under pressure by prominent Hema leaders. Pharaon Babala Ngudjole commanded Zaïre military and gold-mining operations in Lodjo, and Fabrice Maki Jawyambe did the same in Pluto. Baraka Amos Maki was also established to be a major leader within Zaïre by 2024, establishing connections between the group and M23 and also leading a so-called disarmament parade in 2025. After Maki died in a car crash in November 2025, the group was left without a leader and much of the group joined the CRP.

Early on in the group's history, it was a tentative ally of the FARDC, with FARDC soldiers using Zaïrian militants as scouts. In a CODECO attack on a mine owned by a Hema on March 15, 2021, Zaïre and FARDC defended the miners. On the exact same day elsewhere in Djugu, Zaïre clashed with CODECO and the FARDC, and has since attacked FARDC and Congolese police. However, the shaky alliance with the FARDC did continue at times, and Zaïre would conduct operations with the FARDC against CODECO. In Maze, (Note: Maze is the village where the Hema women who identified the Lendu robbers in December 2017 were from. It was the target of many massacres by Lendu militias in 2018.) Zaïre bases were 200 meters away from a FARDC base. allegedly did not conduct many attacks in the early years, and instead was a strictly self-defense organization against FPIC and CODECO attacks. Zaïre began mobilizing and training new recruits in May and June 2024, where they acquired pick-up trucks and drones, increasing operational capacity on Lake Albert.

It first became a more forward and visible group in October 2021, when they began conducting attacks on CODECO. By 2023, the majority of Zaïre and CODECO attacks were on rival Lendu and Hema (and minority) militias. Zaïre militants would seek new fighters and embed themselves in refugee camps, which were the target of frequent attacks by CODECO, with dozens of civilians getting killed. In Djugu, it was mostly Lendu with CODECO versus Hema with Zaïre; north in Mahagi, it was Alur with Zaïre.

Zaïre also utilized roadblocks, taxation, and gold mining to profit and exert control over areas. In 2020, it was noted that while Zaïre elements were present in gold mining regions and some Zaïre fighters were gold miners themselves, the group did not attack gold-mining areas elsewhere and instead "protected their own." This defensive posture was over by 2022, and clashes were omnipresent in Mongbwalu's gold-mining areas between CODECO, FARDC, and Zaïre over territory. By 2021, Zaïre checkpoints were designed to impede the flow of movement of Lendu and Bira civilians, and Lendu and Bira civilians could not pass roads controlled by Zaïre. Often, Lendu and Bira civilians would be executed by these checkpoints simply for their ethnicity. Lendu civilians were eventually hunted down by Pharaon and forcibly displaced. In 2022, Zaïrian militants chanted in the streets of Mongbwalu that Lendu should leave the town. Hema and Alur civilians who spoke out against Zaïre were whipped, tortured, and killed. In 2023, Hema and Alur factions of Zaïre conducted attacks on Lendu civilians, killing at least 32 civilians in several attacks. Weapons were obtained by FARDC and ex-UPC members.

=== Popular Self-Defense Movement of Ituri (MAPI) ===
The MAPI (Note: In French, Mouvement d’autodéfense populaire de l’Ituri.) split from Zaïre on December 22, 2022, claiming to be the official representation of Zaïre and the Hema community. The group expressed its intention to join the Nairobi peace process, which Zaïre refused to join. Some former leaders of Zaïre defected to MAPI, and the group was endorsed by Ituri provincial leaders. However, Hema leaders and allies rejected MAPI, and Zaïrian militants accused MAPI of being a project of Governor Johnny Luboya Nkashama to weaken Zaïre.

In a statement provided to the United Nations, Jean-Pierre Ndjango Liripa was the president of MAPI. Logo Marine was labeled as the vice-president, but did not end up joining the group.

=== M23/Congo River Alliance (M23/AFC) ===
The Congolese government claimed M23 was involved in the Ituri war as early as December 2017. The M23 denied this, and no evidence has been produced of M23 involvement in Ituri militias until 2023. Four M23-linked people were arrested at the Ugandan border in April 2018 inciting M23 networks in Uganda, and the Congolese government accused the M23 of stoking the violence in Djugu. The M23 was again blamed by Ituri governor Jean Bamanisa in 2019 along with the Banyabwisha, but no evidence was produced yet again.

The Rwandan-backed March 23 Movement and its Congolese political-military alliance, the Congo River Alliance, first began outreach to Zaïre and MAPI in 2024. This was spurred by released war criminal and ex-UPC militant Thomas Lubanga Dyilo, who was at the center of negotiations between M23 and Zairian factions. Lubanga mobilized ex-UPC fighters from the first war between 1999 and 2003, and had them train Zaïre recruits at M23/AFC training camps in Tchanzu. Militants were also trained at IDP camps throughout Ituri. There were training camps at Bini, Mambisa Chiefdom led by Zaïre commander Baraka Amos Maki and in Bua, Bahema Banywagi, under Zaïre commander Mandro Saliko. Other locations of traning camps included Mabanga, Katoto, Nzebi, Dhego, and Berunda.

The Congolese government said in June 2024 that Lubanga's bodyguards were the trainers. Other reports allege that Ugandan and Rwandan trainers were at the camps. Training for the militants lasted one month, and mainly focused on combat tactics, camouflage, and usage of weaponry. The Bini and Bua camps were destroyed by FARDC in September 2024, but by this point 3,000 fighters had been trained. In December 2024, 600 Zaïre fighters were undergoing training from M23.

Lubanga around this time also arranged negotiations between Zaïre and MAPI at Lubanga's home in Uganda, with help from the M23/AFC. Negotiations also took place at Hema leader Yves Kahwa Mandro Panga's house near Hoima, Uganda, which was also a connection point for weapons. MAPI and Zaïre agreed to work together in the M23/AFC coalition, although MAPI would remain an independent group. Zaïre commander Logo Marine took part in these negotiations, and traveled back and forth from Ituri and Uganda, Rwanda, and M23-controlled Bunagana. MAPI spokesman Benjamin Bahati also defected from MAPI and joined M23 along with 100 combatants.

AFC leader Corneille Nangaa reached out to CODECO and FPRI leaders in the hopes of establishing reconciliation in Ituri, which the United Nations says was met with "considerable interest." Negotiation between FPRI and M23 were ongoing in December 2024. Kennedy Nari was considered to be a fixer for Ituri groups and M23.

=== Convention for the People's Revolution (CRP) ===
Lubanga launched his own armed group, Convention for the People's Revolution (CPR) on January 10, 2025, with the explicit goal of overthrowing the Congolese government. The organization was created in Kampala, with the political arm being called Convention for the People's Revolution and the military arm being called Forces for the People's Revolution. Logo Marine and Fidele Babala, both of Zaïre, were both instrumental in forming the CRP; Logo Marine was named deputy chief of staff of the CRP. Justin Lobho Zissy, a defected FARDC officer, was named as the defense chief of the group. Lubanga and his allies had been planning to create the CRP as early as September 2024.

The CRP's first attack occurred on February 24, 2025, at Nyamamba, when the CRP killed several FARDC soldiers and abducted an officer. This attack was led by Baraka Nguna, a former Zaïre officer. In another attack, it killed 19 civilians. It publicly announced its existence in March 2025 in Berunda, Djugu territory. Shortly after announcing its intention to not join a national unity government in Kinshasa, Baraka Amos Maki released a statement declaring his loyalty to Kinshasa but did not break from M23/CRP.

Lubanga's M23 and Hema-backing ally Yves Mandro Kahwa Panga said that Lubanga founded the CRP to "glean his share of the pie." The group had generally failed to gain any local or national popular support. (Note: In Nyamamba, the location of the first attack, rumors that CRP was going to take control of the town caused a panic.) It published a letter claiming to speak for all groups and appointed various militant leaders to different posts, including CODECO leaders; many of those named rejected their appointments. By October 2025, the CRP had weakened severely, and the group's vice-president Charles Kakani defected. The CRP also caused rifts between Zaïre leaders. Maki died in a car crash in November 2025.

At the time of Maki's death, the CRP had 300 militants. Following the collapse of Zaire's leadership, many Zaire fighters defected to the CRP and inflated its membership to 1,000 by June 2026. Most of these fighters were Hema, and the group failed to recruit Lendu youth. The CRP recruited from refugee camps in the province and did not have much popular support. The group received arms from illicit trading networks from Uganda, the DRC, Rwanda, and South Sudan, and at times received arms and medical support from the UPDF, with the UPDF going so far as to airlift injured CRP fighters to Uganda. Its current headquarters is Bule, and the group is active along Lake Albert.

In early 2026, the Ugandan government mediated negotiations between the CRP and the Congolese government. Lubanga's primary demand was the removal of Governor Johnny Luboya Nkashama. (Note: According to Lubanga, in early 2025 he received a call from an aide of Felix Tshisekedi. Tshisekedi indirectly asked him why he was "acting this way"; Lubanga said he was discontent with Congolese governance in Ituri and how Luboya was acting. Tshisekedi said Luboya was "not irremovable", but nothing happened to him in the months afterward.) His other demands were the removal of the state of siege, prisoner releases, and an amnesty for CRP militants, similar to CODECO's demands in 2022. The CRP also demanded the withdrawal of the FARDC from the Bule-Fataki and Mabanga-Dhego areas, along with the arrest of pro-government Wazalendo militants who killed civilians.

=== Convention for the National Liberation of the Congo (CNLC) ===
Innocent Kaina, a Congolese Tutsi and M23 supporter who worked with Kahwa and Lubanga in allying Zaire with M23, also launched his own armed group called the Convention for the National Liberation of the Congo (CNLC). The CNLC was launched in April 2025 in Kampala, and the Congolese government did not react to its creation. The CNLC was formed in close proximity, and works with, the CPR.

== Congolese government and allies ==
=== Armed Forces of the Democratic Republic of the Congo and Congolese National Police (FARDC / PNC) ===
In the first days of the war in Ituri between 2017 and 2018, the Congolese government was involved when armed groups attacked them, but was idle when civilians were being massacred by CODECO and Lendu militias. Lendu civilians believed that the FARDC was close to the Hema, a driving factor in some Lendu joining CODECO and community militias. Many civilians, though, viewed the FARDC as parasitic and focused on small-scale extortion of gold mines.

The army's first involvement in the conflict was at the outbreak of it in Uzi, when Lendu civilians stole a gun from a FARDC camp in December 2017. After two months of ethnically driven massacres, the FARDC was next involved when Lendu militias attacked them on February 20 in Tche. The FARDC would be attacked several more times in the first wave of violence until September 2018 - PAX for Peace documents the killing of 32 FARDC and Congolese National Police (PNC) soldiers between December 2017 and August 2018 - but civilians repeatedly said that FARDC would not pursue perpetrators when a village was attacked, leading many Hema and Lendu to not have confidence in them.

In the second spate of CODECO violence led by Mukwake Mambo, FARDC and PNC posts were attacked regularly. This second spate of violence is said to have been caused by FARDC soldiers looting Lendu villages with Hema militiamen. The FARDC killed Mukwake Mambo in September 2018, leading to the rise of Justin Ngudjolo. Two Congolese colonels - Colonel Bovick and Colonel Jaguar - were killed in these September 2018 attacks on FARDC posts, although it is not entirely clear if the two colonels' deaths were caused by CODECO. Sixteen FARDC soldiers were killed and seven were kidnapped between January 2019 and June 10, 2019. In the June 2019 Bunia massacres, CODECO and Lendu militias attacked FARDC posts and soldiers.

Operation Zaruba ya Ituri was launched by FARDC on June 26, 2019, in response to the Bunia massacres. The operation was semi-successful, as it broke up CODECO's base in the Wago forest, but CODECO remained a presence and moved to western Djugu. The operation, however, reignited tensions with Lendu and Hema as Lendu believed the FARDC were colluding with the Hema again. FARDC around this time were indeed using spies from the fledgling Zaïre-FPAC. FARDC collaboration with civilians, particularly Hema civilians, has made these civilians a target of militant groups. This collaboration with Zaire continued into 2021, although it is not clear whether FARDC command supported joint operations with Zaire or if the militia just worked with some FARDC soldiers.

A successor operation, Operation Zaruba ya Ituri II, was launched in early March 2020 after Ngudjolo's death, which killed 309 CODECO militants and 63 Congolese soldiers by May 18. MONUSCO joined FARDC activities in June 2020. In 2020, 172 FARDC soldiers were killed. FARDC soldiers sometimes sold off weapons to CODECO and FPIC militants in 2020 and 2021 for quick cash, despite CODECO attacks increasing on FARDC positions during this time with the weapons sold off. Some FARDC soldiers were arrested for this.

In January 2023, a CODECO-URPDC attack in Njala killed 17 FARDC soldiers and wounded 14 others.

==== State of siege ====
When Felix Tshisekedi declared a state of siege in Ituri and North Kivu in May 2021, the civilian government of Jean Bamanisa was dismissed and Johnny Luboya Nkashama was appointed as military governor of the region. Under the state of siege, Congolese civil society activists were routinely targeted by the state and were not allowed to speak out. Nkashama's failure to respond well to the 2026 Ebola epidemic that started in Mongbwalu led him to be replaced by General Kasongo Batoka Mulumba Gaby, who had previously served as deputy commander of Tshopo,

==== Killing of civilians by FARDC ====
The first reported killing of civilians by FARDC took place in Mbau, Walendu Djatsi, FARDC soldiers began shooting at civilians while attempting to infiltrate a CODECO network. On June 25, 2020, soldiers of the 3308th Regiment of the Second Battalion of the FARDC led by Colonel Patrick summarily executed 13 civilians and raped two in Gudjo-Ngaludza, Djugu. The 3308th Regiment, along with the 3201st Regiment, both in the 2nd Battalion, were involved in looting of civilian homes in the Lendu towns of Njukpa, Linga, Buba, and others in Walendu Pitsi in June 2020. These crimes against Lendu civilians were partially responsible for some Lendu joining CODECO in 2021 and 2022.

Other civilians reported that they were targeted for just being Lendu, and detained and tortured by FARDC and PNC soldiers. Women from Ezekere reported they were raped by FARDC soldiers. Soldiers under the command of Tipu Zero Zero were accused of gang-raping at least ten women between June and December 2021. Other soldiers from the 312th "Voltigeurs" Battalion robbed and then raped two women. Tipu Zero Zero did not deny the rapes: rather, he said his soldiers were "tempted" since there were no women in the camp, and advised the population to be careful. Throughout 2021, soldiers of the 111th Commando Battalion raped several Lendu women, including a 15-year-old girl, and killed one woman after raping her. Lendu and Bira young men were arbitrarily arrested, and forced to pay to be released.

Crimes against civilians by FARDC increased when the state of siege was declared. FARDC members from the 111th Battalion at Libi and 32062nd "Leopard" Battalion at Bamba and Kobu routinely attacked Lendu villages, displacing and sometimes killing residents. Indiscriminate FARDC aerial bombing near Mongbwalu, Nyangaray, and other sites in Walendu Pitsi injured two civilians and destroyed schools and health facilities. In one bombing in July 2021, FARDC soldiers told civilians to shelter at a Catholic school and then bombed the school. In another bombing on January 11, 2022, FARDC helicopters bombed a civilian town but left a UPRDC headquarters untouched.

==== Gold mining and smuggling ====
In 2021, FARDC soldiers from the 312th Battalion "Hindu Unite" under Lt. Col. Joseph Nganzole Olikwa, also known as Tipu Zero Zero, were also gold-mining bandits in Mongbwalu, according to civilians. However, a spokesman for the FARDC denied these claims and said that FARDC soldiers were on the perimeter of the mines to protect miners from armed attacks. Since December 2021, soldiers of the 3308th and 3201st regiments under Col. Charles Muhinda Santos were extorting miners, demanding 30-50% of gold mined. Santos denied the allegations.

This involvement in smuggling and illicit activities, combined with poor performance in rooting out militants, led to the firing of top FARDC commanders early on. The commander of Ituri, General Kabundi, was placed under house arrest by national intelligence for his role in racketeering. The deputy commander, General Chiviri Amuli took over, despite Amuli also being involved in mining. General Rambo Kahengere was dismissed in 2019 after it was discovered his troops sold weapons to CODECO.

By 2024, mining companies continued to pay FARDC and the PNC for protection, although most mines were controlled by Zaire and CODECO.

=== United Nations' Organization Stabilization Mission in the Democratic Republic of the Congo (MONUSCO) ===
MONUSCO first deployed troops against CODECO and Hema militias in 2020, and began carrying out joint MONUSCO-FARDC patrols in areas of Ituri in late 2020 and throughout 2021. The mission recorded its first death on April 5, 2022, during a search operation in the village of Bali, a URPDC stronghold. MONUSCO was able to enact some aspects of the Nairobi peace process and peace agreements stipulated by the Congolese government like Aru II, but overall were unable to fully control the violence.

=== Ugandan People's Defense Forces (UPDF) ===
Ugandan soldiers had been fighting in Ituri against the Allied Democratic Forces alongside the FARDC in Operation Shujaa since 2021, although the area of Ituri where the UPDF was fighting and where CODECO was fighting were different, and the two groups scarcely interacted. The first clash between the UPDF in Ituri against CODECO or affiliates was in February 2022, when UPDF and FARDC fighters shot at FPIC militants rustling cattle.

The UPDF fully entered the war in February and March 2025, without discussing with Congolese forces. Ugandan officials under the command of Felix Busizoori of the 4th Infantry Division deployed over 1,000 troops to Mahagi, Djugu, and Bunia. Ugandan officials claimed that they were there to protect Hema civilians, but routinely protected mines and gas locations along Lake Albert. The FARDC accepted the UPDF's deployment in March, and Tshisekedi worked with Ugandan army commander Muhoozi Kainerugaba to form joint FARDC-UPDF patrols along RN27. By the end of 2026, the Ugandan troop count in Ituri expanded from 3,000 to 6,000.

== Islamic State and affiliates ==
The Islamic State – Central Africa Province (ISCAP), more commonly known by its deadname the Allied Democratic Forces, has been active in Ituri province since 2021. The area of its activity has been predominantly the southern part of Ituri province in Irumu Territory and Mambasa Territory, and the group has not registered a presence in Djugu territory or Mahagi territory. There have been few incidents of clashes between ISCAP and militant groups involved in the Ituri war.

The Congolese and Ugandan governments have accused Ituri groups at various times of colluding with the ADF. The M23 did try and reach out to ISCAP in 2024 to form a non-aggression pact, but ISCAP refused. In March 2025, the UPDF accused CODECO of allying with ISCAP, but provided no evidence. In September 2021, the FPIC clashed with ISCAP near Komanda; the FARDC accused the two of being in an alliance, and the FPIC said that they clashed with ISCAP after FARDC soldiers fled. The ADF said they clashed with an "infidel Christian militia."

== See also ==
- List of armed groups in the Democratic Republic of the Congo
