= 2019 Djugu massacres =

2019 Djugu masssacres
- Part of Ituri war (2017-present)
- Location: Bunia and Djugu Territory, Ituri Province, Democratic Republic of the Congo
- Date: June 10 - 29, 2019
- Target: Hema civilians
- Deaths: 523+
- Injuries: Unknown
- Victims: 360,000+ displaced
- Perpetrators: CODECO and Lendu militias

Between June 10 and 29, 2019, Lendu militiamen and CODECO attacked Hema civilians in and around Bunia in response to the alleged killing of a Lendu trader. At least 523 civilians were killed and over 300,000 displaced.

== Background ==
Renewed conflict between Lendu and Hema militants began in Ituri province in December 2017, and kicked up in early 2018 with massacres by Lendu militiamen against Hema villages in Djugu territory. While Bunia, the provincial capital of Ituri Province, had not seen any fighting since 2017, it was home to thousands of displaced civilians.

== Massacres ==
On June 10, 2019, following increased Lendu attacks on Hema communities, gunmen (Note: International Crisis Group says "suspected Hema actors" while Governance in Conflict says CODECO was behind the killing, with the backing of local Lendu businessmen.) killed four Lendu traders in the village of Bembu-Nzi, including a prominent Lendu trader named Tikpa. The killing was allegedly organized by CODECO, led by a man named Go. Local chiefs in Pimbo supported Tikpa's killing because he had refused to donate to CODECO. Tikpa was against donating to CODECO because since the start of the violence, many Lendu-owned businesses had lost Hema customers and he wanted to keep his customer base.

Immediately after Tikpa's killing, CODECO attacked several villages near Kobu, and retaliatory demonstrations took place. Three people were killed on June 10 in Kparangaza, two in Sayo Mongbwalu, three in D’da, one in Kokoliko, and six in Ddi. The violence included CODECO, FARDC soldiers, and angry armed civilians, and not all villages have found all the bodies. On June 11, five were killed in Waiso and Noko and the village of Sombo was burnt down. One particular attack killed 38 people in Tche on June 11, although some estimates say at least 161 people were killed in Tche alone. That same day, a FARDC convoy was ambushed in Longokpa.

More clashes occurred on June 11 in Rule, Blukwa, Ndjala, Sumbuso, Dhendro, Duvire, Ngolo, Reta and Lirri. At least five health centers were burned down. Some reports estimate 130 people were killed on June 11 alone. On 12 and 13 June, hundreds of cattle were pillaged in Goikpa. On June 13, the villages of Rule, Somba, Duvire, Saokpa and Bunya were all attacked, killing almost 40 people. A day later, a motorcyclist was killed in Dhendro; two more were killed in Iga Barriere on June 15 bringing back the bodies of those massacred between June 10-11. One person was killed in Ndoki by CODECO.

Another motorcyclist was killed by CODECO on June 16, this time in Maze. CODECO attacked FARDC in Ndri on June 18, killing eight civilians in Dema. Five were killed in Nyamamba, seven in Reta, three in Limbi, five in Tsuki, two in Ndoki and two in Ndjachulu all in response to a string of attacks on June 18. Sixteen people were killed in Kafe and Mbogi on June 21, and four more were killed a day later in Sumbusu. Nine soldiers were killed in clashes with CODECO in Kpandroma on June 25.

The majority of these communities were Hema, but not all. The Red Cross reported they had found at least 400 bodies, and at least 360,000 people were displaced in June. Most of the attacks came from the CODECO strongholds in the Wago and Mbau forests. In response to the renewed Lendu offensive, the Congolese army launched Operation Zaruba ya Ituri on June 26 with the goal of clearing CODECO militants from the area. At least 20,000 soldiers took part in the operation.

== Response ==
Félix Tshisekedi visited Bunia and Djugu on June 30 to attempt to ease the violence. In his speech, he vowed to eliminate CODECO, although he did not name the group. He did, however, call the massacres an "attempted genocide".
