= Gaël Assumani =

Congolese boxer (born 1995)

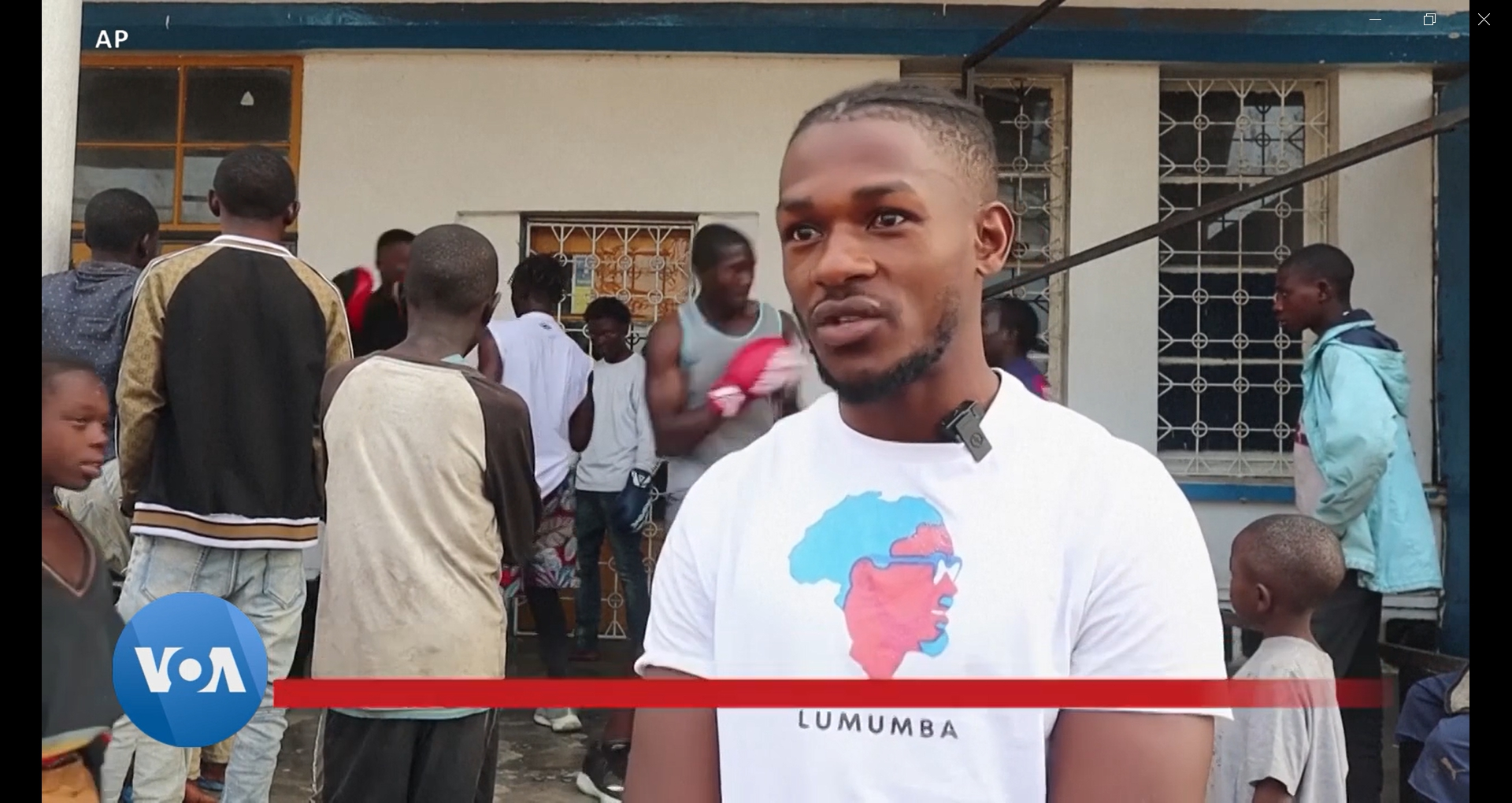

Personal information
- Full name: Gaël Assumani
- Nickname: Nyama Fighter
- Nationality: Democratic Republic of the Congo
- Born: March 29, 1995 (age 31) Nyakunde, Orientale Province, DRC
- Height: 1.76 m (5 ft 9 in)

Sport
- Sport: Boxing
- Weight class: lightweight

Gaël Assumani (born March 29, 1995) is a Congolese boxer who crowned champion of the Democratic Republic of Congo lightweight in 2020 and 2021.

== Biography ==
Gaël Assumani was born on March 29, 1995, in Nyakunde, located southwest of Bunia, in the territory of Irumu. He became the Democratic Republic of Congo lightweight champion on November 28, 2020, after his victory against Abass Habamungu from South Kivu and once again, he won this title in the ring in June 2021 in Goma, after five rounds of perfect equality and sanctioned by huge blows on both sides by K.O, against Sylvain Muhindo.
