= Kpandroma =

Coordinates: 2.063°N 30.897°E

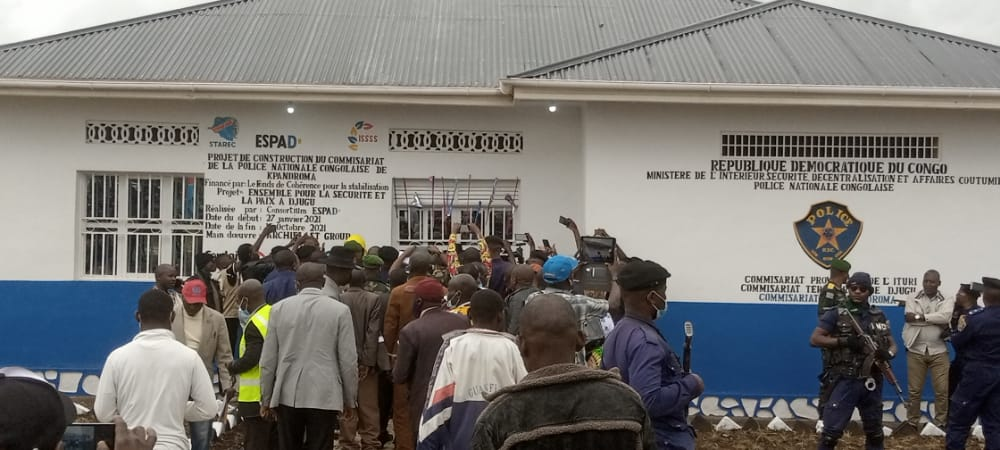
Kpandruma's new Police station in 2021

Kpandroma, also spelled Kpandruma or Kwandruma, is a town in the Ituri Province, Democratic Republic of the Congo. It is located at about 2050 m above sea level, on the Lendu Plateau, 17 km northwest of Lake Albert and 30 km southwest of the frontier with Uganda. Kpandroma is crossed by the RS436 road; it is about 3300 km from Kinshasa by road, 123 from the province's capital Bunia, 70 km from Drodro, and 40 km from Mahagi, the two nearest larger towns in the province.

Kpandroma is about 4 km south of Rethy (Reti), the site of the Rethy Academy, a school for children of missionaries set up by the Africa Inland Mission (AIM).

The Congolese rebel group Nationalist and Integrationist Front (FNI) was founded at Kpandroma in November 2002 by Floribert Njabu, together with two Hema commissioners and an Ngiti commissioner (Pichou Iribi Mbodina).
