= Marabho attack =

2020 battle of the Ituri conflict

- Part of Ituri conflict
Date	May 4, 2020
Location	Marabho, Irumu Territory, Ituri Province, Democratic Republic of the Congo
Result	FARDC victory

Belligerents
FARDC	Kyini ya kilima

Casualties and losses
4 killed 2 injured	8 killed 6 injured

On May 4, 2020, fighters from Kyini ya kilima ambushed Congolese soldiers (FARDC) in Marabho, near Bunia, Ituri Province.

== Background ==
Kyini ya kilima, also known as the Patriotic and Integrationist Front of Congo, is a militia group supported by the Bira people of Ituri. The group was founded around 2019, and claimed to defend Bira interests. There are no known attacks from Kyini ya kilima prior to the ambush in Marabho. However, the group began growing in size in early 2020.

== Ambush ==
Around 5am, Kyini ya kilima fighters entered a FARDC camp in Marabho and shot at the soldiers, sparking clashes. Congolese forces shot back at the fighters, forcing them to flee. The FARDC announced the seizure of several munitions and four AK-47s from the fighters. Two fighters were taken prisoner by the fighters as well. Congolese forces also stated that eight of the fighters were killed and six were injured. Four Congolese soldiers were killed, and two were injured.

== Aftermath ==
Congolese forces stated that the situation was under control and that Marabho was under control of Congolese forces on May 5. They attributed the ambush to Kyini ya kilima, but no group claimed responsibility.
