= Nyamamba and Mbogi massacres =

Discovery of mass graves in the DRC (Democratic Republic of the Congo)

- Part of Ituri conflict
- Location: Nyamamba and Mbogi, Ituri province, Democratic Republic of the Congo
- Date: January 13, 2023
- Deaths: 49 killed: 42 in Nyamamba; 7 in Mbogi
- Perpetrators: CODECO-URPDC and CODECO-ALC
- Motive: Killing of a Lendu schoolteacher

On January 19, 2023, the United Nations investigators discovered the bodies of forty-two civilians in the village of Nyamamba, Ituri Province, Democratic Republic of the Congo, and seven bodies in the village of Mbogi, in the same province. The victims were killed on January 13 by militants from CODECO's ALC and URPDC factions.

== Background ==
CODECO is a loose-knit alliance of Lendu militias in Ituri province, that has been fighting against the Congolese government and Hema militias since the start of the Ituri conflict. In February 2022, the group killed dozens of civilians in a refugee camp in Plaine Savo. Between December 2022 and the start of the Nyamamba attacks, over a hundred civilians had been killed in Ituri.

In late December, CODECO sought revenge for an attack on a Lendu teacher by the Zaire-FPAC militia, a rival to CODECO. Prior to the attack, militants from CODECO's URPDC and ALC factions had occupied Nyamamba peacefully. CODECO militants mobilized in December 2022, preparing for attacks on Hema communities. Five days prior to the Nyamamba and Mbogi massacres, 23 people were killed at Blukwa in CODECO attacks.

== Massacres ==
A survivor of the massacre said that the CODECO militants went door-to-door on January 13, saying they were conducting an "operation" and that their relationship with the population was over from that day forward. Civilians were told to gather near the health center, where they were slaughtered with machetes. Those who fled into the bush were shot at. Several women were kidnapped, tied up, and forced into being sex slaves for months.

Reports emerged of attacks by CODECO on villages near Bunia during the weekend of January 14–15, 2023, prompting MONUSCO to dispatch a patrol to the area. When the peacekeepers arrived at the village of Nyabamba, they discovered the recently buried bodies of forty-two civilians. Seven civilians were buried in the village of Mbogi, located thirty kilometers away. In the Nyabamba graves, twelve women and six children were among the victims. The Mbogi graves consisted of seven men.

== Aftermath ==
Protests erupted across Ituri against MONUSCO following the attacks, as civilians saw the peacekeepers as not protecting them from CODECO. In Goma, demonstrators protested against the East African Command for their inability to defend civilians against CODECO as well. In Bunia, the city protested by holding a "dead city" for three days. CODECO accused Zaire-FPAC of the massacres.

On January 20, CODECO attacked the Plaine Savo camp and killed seven people, including five children. Refugees in the camp then protested at the nearby MONUSCO base.
