= Lala camp massacre =

- Part of Ituri conflict
- Location: Lala refugee camp, near Bule, Ituri Province, Democratic Republic of the Congo
- Date: June 12, 2023
- Deaths: 46
- Injuries: 8
- Perpetrator: CODECO

On June 12, 2023, Lendu militants from CODECO attacked the Lala refugee camp in the district of Bahema Badjere, Ituri Province, Democratic Republic of the Congo, killing at least 46 civilians.

== Background ==
CODECO is a Congolese militant group based in Ituri and predominantly composed of Lendus. The group has attacked Hema communities in conflicts over farming and land rights for decades, although CODECO's insurgency in recent years had disproportionately targeted civilians. In April 2023, the group attacked several villages in Banyani Kilo, killing at least 60 people.

Lala camp is a major refugee camp for civilians fleeing violence in the Ituri conflict, and is located near the village of Bule, which hosts a Congolese Army and MONUSCO base. Between April 15 and May 15, around 70,000 displaced people fled to Lala from violence in the area.

== Massacre ==
The massacre began at 2am, when CODECO militants entered the southern and northeastern sides of the camp and began shooting indiscriminately at the residents. People who ran out of their huts were shot at, and others were hacked to death with knives and machetes. Congolese soldiers were located a minimum of 1.5 kilometers away, and MONUSCO peacekeepers mentioned seeing fire at the camp from their positions. MONUSCO couldn't reach the camp because their vehicles broke down.

At least 46 civilians were killed in the massacre. Of the victims, 23 were children and 13 were women. Eight others were also injured. Congolese and MONUSCO forces did not arrive at Lala until after the massacre, and assisted in picking up bodies of the victims.

== Aftermath ==
Jules Ngongo, a spokesman for the Congolese army, said that the army conducted anti-CODECO operations in the month after the attack. However, many residents refused to return to Lala because of the fear of another attack. Many fled and sleep outside of the village of Bule.
