= Jean Bamanisa Saïdi =

Congolese politician

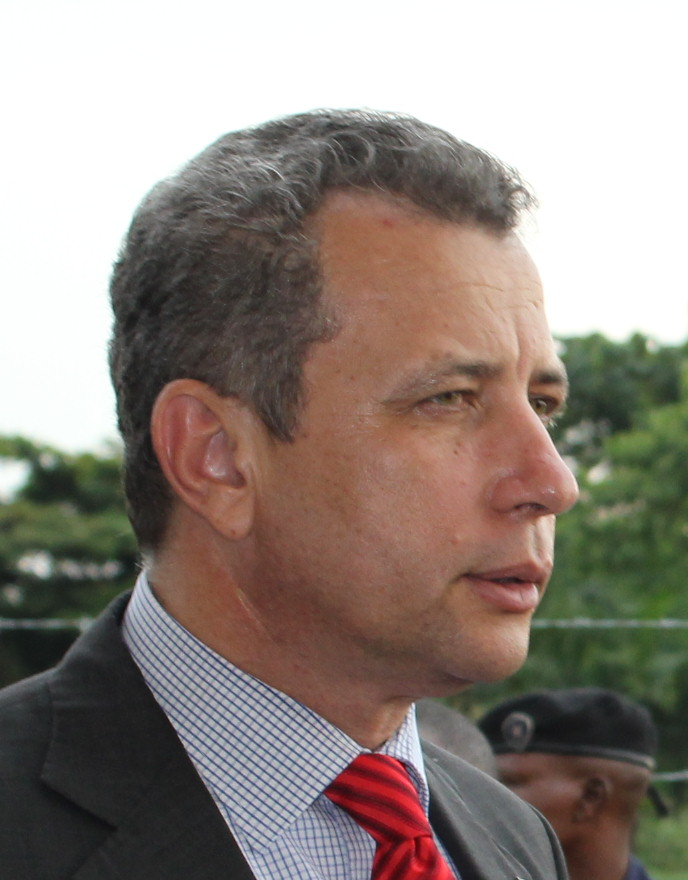
- Saïdi in 2013

Governor of Ituri Province
- In office 21 May 2019 – 6 May 2021
- Preceded by: Pacifique Keta Upar (acting)
- Succeeded by: Johnny Luboya Nkashama

Governor of Orientale Province
- In office February 2013 – October 2015
- Preceded by: Ismaël Arama Ndiama (acting)
- Succeeded by: (province dissolved)

Personal details
- Born: 7 April 1964 (age 62) Kisangani
- Occupation: Businessman, politician
- Website: https://www.jeanbamanisa.com

Jean Bamanisa Saïdi (born 7 April 1964) is a Congolese businessman and politician who was governor of the former Orientale Province from 2013 to 2015 and governor of Ituri Province from 2019 to 2021.

== Early years ==
Jean Bamanisa is the son of Alex Barlovatz, a doctor from Yugoslavia, and Violette Nyakato, who came from the Ituri region. Barlovatz moved to Kisangani in the 1930s, where he had a successful general medical practice. Bamanisa was born in 1964 in Kisangani. He went to university in Kisangani, and then moved to Kinshasa. He established a building maintenance company named BAJE in 1987, and later created a subsidiary named PETRO BAJE that distributes petroleum products. He married Caroline Bemba, sister of the opposition leader Jean-Pierre Bemba.

== Political career ==
In the early 2000s Bamanisa entered politics. He was elected a member of the national assembly for Kisangani in 2006. He was friendly with President Joseph Kabila despite his ties by marriage to the opposition leader. In the 2012 election for governor of Orientale Province he won by 48 votes to 45. In 2013 his Barnet Group concluded a $230m agreement with the South African company PPC Ltd. to build a cement factory in Orientale.

Bamanisa became governor of Ituri Province on 21 May 2019. On 20 November 2019 the provincial deputies voted out Bamanisa Saidi and his government with a motion of no confidence, accusing him of mismanagement of the province and lack of respect to the deputies. On 7 February 2020 he was rehabilitated by the Constitutional Court. On 30 May 2020 he called for international troops to help restore peace. Over 300 people had been killed by fighters of the CODECO (Cooperative for the Development of Congo) militia group in the province in the last three months. MONUSCO, The United Nations Organization Stabilization Mission in the DRC, was no longer intervening, but only acting as observers.

== Sources ==
- "Ituri : Le Gouverneur Jean Bamanisa déchu par les députés provinciaux", jambordc.info, 20 November 2019
- "Congo (Kinshasa) Provinces", Rulers.org
- Matendo, Paul (10 February 2020), "Jean Bamanisa après sa réhabilitation : " Nous ne sommes pas dans une gestion conflictuelle "", Radio Okapi
- Mthembu-Salter, Gregory (20 November 2014), "DRC: Jean Bamanisa Saïdi, Kisangani's loved governor", The Africa Report, Kisangani
- Quenum, Frejus; Sandner, Philipp (30 May 2020), "DR Congo: Ituri governor appeals for help to stop 'ongoing genocide'", Deutsche Welle
