= October 2020 Ituri offensive =

2020 conflict in Democratic Republic of the Congo

- Part of Ituri conflict
Date	October 24–28, 2020
Location	Dele, Ezekere, Walendu Tatsi, and the Blue Mountains, Ituri Province, Democratic Republic of the Congo
Result	Congolese victory: Sporadic CODECO-ALC attacks in November 2020

Belligerents
Democratic Republic of the Congo; MONUSCO	CODECO-ALC

Commanders and leaders
Unknown	Justin Maki Gesi "Mountain Wolf" †

Casualties and losses
7–9 soldiers killed Several soldiers injured	33 killed

On October 24, 2020, militants from CODECO-ALC attacked Congolese and MONUSCO forces in the town of Dele, Ituri Province, Democratic Republic of the Congo. In response, Congolese forces launched an offensive against CODECO-ALC, capturing several towns from the group and killing its leader Mountain Wolf.

== Background ==
In 2020, CODECO began peace talks with the Congolese government and MONUSCO into laying down their arms in Ituri Province. These talks culminated in a ceasefire in August 2020 by CODECO. The first faction of CODECO to sign the peace agreement was CODECO - Alliance for the Liberation of the Congo (CODECO-ALC), headquartered in Walendu Tatsi and Ezekere, near Bunia. CODECO-ALC was led by Justin Maki Gesi, known as Mountain Wolf.

A few months after signing the agreement, CODECO-ALC broke off from the ceasefire agreement, and began preparing for attacks in and around Bunia. The first incursion was by 200 fighters into Bunia, demanding the release of inmates from the prison. CODECO-ALC then began a campaign against the Congolese government and MONUSCO around the city.

== Offensive ==
On October 24, 2020, MONUSCO peacekeepers patrolling the town of Dele, outside of Bunia, caught CODECO-ALC militants burning down civilian houses in the town. A firefight broke out between the two groups, and the peacekeepers managed to dislodge CODECO-ALC from the town, and called for backup. That same day, clashes broke out between CODECO-ALC and Congolese soldiers in the towns of Kijogo and Fichama. Congolese soldiers repelled CODECO-ALC in these attacks, but residents reported that at least two Congolese soldiers were wounded in the attacks.

Congolese forces then went on the offensive against CODECO-ALC in the Blue Mountains over the following days. Heavy fighting occurred in Ezekere, and Congolese soldiers pushed CODECO-ALC out of Djokodjo, Kambutso, and Mbetshi as well. At least thirty-three militants were killed in the offensive, and two to four Congolese troops were killed. On October 26, Congolese soldiers pushed CODECO-ALC out of Walendu Tatsi. In the Congolese offensive, Mountain Wolf was killed.

On November 3, CODECO-ALC launched an attack on Ezekere that killed five Congolese soldiers. However, Congolese forces retained control of the base that was attacked, and continued operations against CODECO in the area.
