= Drodro =

- Refugee camp
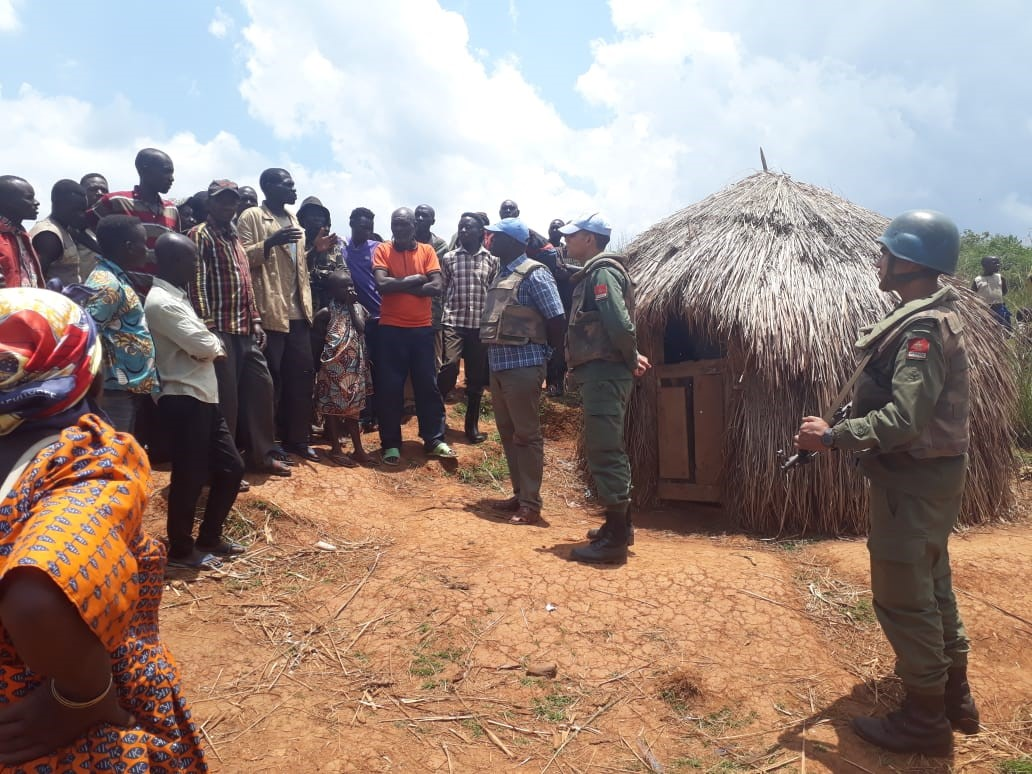
- UN peacekeepers from Morocco on a visit to Drodro.

- Location within Democratic Republic of the Congo
- Coordinates: 1°46′0″N 30°32′0″E
- Country: Democratic Republic of the Congo
- Province: Ituri
- Territory: Djugu territory

Population
  - Total: 25,000
  - Refugee population: 20,000+

Drodro is a refugee camp in Djugu territory, located in the Ituri province of the Democratic Republic of the Congo.

== History ==
=== Second Congo war ===
On July 1, 2003, a few months before the end of the Second Congo War, armed forces were responsible for the mass murder of 966 people in Drodro and the surrounding localities.

=== 2017 ===
In 2017, the ethnic Lendu priest Florent Dhunji died during his visit to Drodro Parish (which is mostly composed of the Hema people), leading to an upsurge of ethnic tensions in the Ituri conflict as Lendus charged Hema abbots with murdering Dhunji.

=== 2018 ===
On March 1, 2018, ethnic conflict broke out again in Drodro, this time over land disputes.

=== 2021 massacre ===
Drodro massacre
- Part of the 2021 Democratic Republic of the Congo attacks
- Location: Drodro
- Date: November 21, 2021
- Deaths: 44
- Perpetrator: CODECO

On November 21, 2021, under the cover of night, the Cooperative for Development of the Congo (CODECO) raided the settlement, leading to the massacre of numerous residents.

During the massacre, the perpetrators inflicted heavy damage against civilians, killing a reported 35 civilians inside the local church and burning down 1,200 shelters.

Congolese Armed Forces spokesman, Jules Ngongo, initially confirmed that at least 12 people had been confirmed dead, but the number of dead was later risen to 44.

== See also ==
- List of massacres in the Democratic Republic of the Congo
