= Plaine Savo massacre =

2022 mass murder in the Democratic Republic of the Congo

- Part of Ituri conflict
- Plaine Savo massacre (Democratic Republic of the Congo)
- Location: 1°45′44″N 30°35′25″E; Plaine Savo, Ituri province, Democratic Republic of the Congo
- Date: 2 February 2022; 02:00 (CAT (UTC+02:00))
- Target: Hema people
- Attack type: Mass murder of internally displaced people
- Weapons: machetes and edged weapons, guns
- Deaths: 60+
- Injuries: ~40
- Perpetrator: CODECO
- Motive: Nomadic conflict, ethnic cleansing

On 2 February 2022, over 60 civilians from the Hema ethnic group were killed in a massacre in Djugu territory, Ituri Province, Democratic Republic of the Congo.

During the early hours, CODECO insurgents armed with machetes and edged weapons attacked Plaine Savo, a camp for internally displaced people in the northeast of the country in which around 4,000 people live. Forces from the Congolese military made contact with the CODECO militia prior to the attack but were bypassed when the assailants changed direction.

"I first heard cries when I was still in bed. Then several minutes of gunshots. I fled and I saw torches and people crying for help and I realised it was the CODECO militiamen who had invaded our site." – Local resident

Four people, including the chief of the Bahema N’adhere community, were hospitalized.

== See also ==
- 2021–2022 Democratic Republic of the Congo attacks
- List of massacres in the Democratic Republic of the Congo
