= Zaïre-FPAC =

Decentralized Hema militant group

- Founder: Zawadi Vajeru
- Founded: 2020
- Active regions: Ituri
- Size: 700

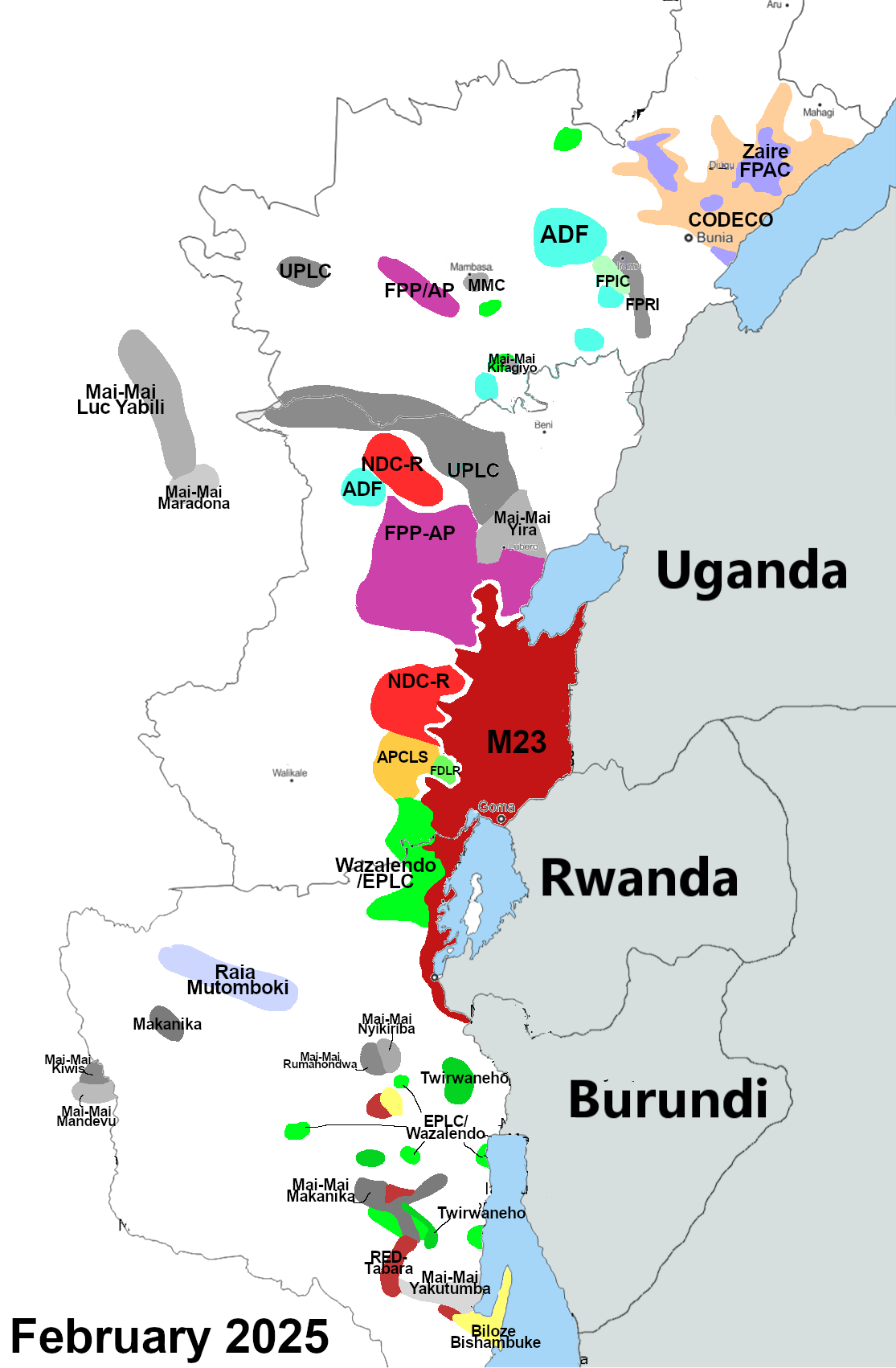
Territorial control in February 2025 in the Kivu Conflict

The Ituri Self-Defense Popular Front (French: Front populaire d’autodéfense en Ituri (FPAC), more commonly known as Zaïre-FPAC, is a decentralized Hema militant group or groups operating in the Democratic Republic of the Congo. They were formed in response to Cooperative for Development of the Congo (CODECO) expansions and the ongoing Ituri conflict. Very little is known about the group, their organizational structure, or members. It is a member of the Congo River Alliance. The group has committed several massacres and atrocities, and was "strongly condemned" by the United Nations in 2023 for their human rights abuses.

== Background ==
Throughout the 1900s and 2000s, there have been a series of long-standing and violent conflict between the Lendu people and the Hema people of the Ituri Province, in the Democratic Republic of the Congo(DRC). The conflict has resulted in many massacres carried out by local militias, most of which occurred during the Second Congo War. In 2019 and 2020, the Lendu militia Cooperative for Development of the Congo (CODECO) took part in a series of disarmament and peace talks, resulting in ceasefire agreements. However, various factions and splinter groups continued to operate after throughout the peace negotiations. Sometime during 2020, the Ituri Self-Defense popular group was created to resist the still-active CODECO forces. They described themselves as the protectors of the Hema people, and primarily operate in Djugu territory.

== Operations ==
Very little is known about the group or groups operating under the name Zaïre-FPAC. They are decentralized and the members operate secretively. According to the Congo Research Group, this secrecy is most likely to protect the members from legal action.It is funded in part by the gold trade.

Zaïre-FPAC has been involved in several clashes with CODECO militants and Armed Forces of the Democratic Republic of the Congo, although it has been known to work with military forces on occasion. According to the Congo Research Group, Zaïre-FPAC has been involved in various atrocities. In May 2022, the group was accused of killing eleven civilians in Ndungbe, Eastern Province, Democratic Republic of the Congo. In December 2023, the United Nations Security Council "strongly condemned" Zaïre-FPAC, alongside other armed groups operating in the DRC for violating international and humanitarian laws, and for perpetrating human rights abuses.

== See also ==
- Ituri conflict

== Bibliography ==
- UN Security Council (2020-12-31). "Midterm report of the Group of Experts on the Democratic Republic of the Congo (S/2020/1283) - Democratic Republic of the Congo". reliefweb.int. United Nations Security Council – via reliefweb.
