= Irumu Territory =

Irumu Territory Wilaya ya Irumu (Swahili)
- Territory
- Territoire d‘Irumu
- Interactive map of Irumu Territory
- Location in DR Congo
- Coordinates: 1.45261°N 29.87526°E
- Country: DR Congo
- Province: Ituri
- Seat: Irumu

Area
  - Total: 8,183 km^{2} (3,159 sq mi)

Population
  - Total: 1,271,413
  - Density: 155.4/km^{2} (402.4/sq mi)
- Time zone: UTC+2 (Central Africa Time)

Irumu is a territory of Ituri province, Democratic Republic of the Congo. It is located in the northeastern part of the country, 1,700 km east of the capital Kinshasa. Its administrative center is the town of Irumu.

The territory nearly encloses the provincial capital Bunia, home of many clashes in recent years between the Hema and Lendu tribes.

The surroundings around Irumu are a mosaic of farmland and natural vegetation. Around Irumu, it is quite densely populated, with 75 inhabitants per square kilometer. Tropical monsoon climate prevails in the area. Annual average temperature in the funnel is 20 °C. The warmest month is February, when the average temperature is 22 °C, and the coldest is June, with 18 °C. Average annual rainfall is 1,041 millimeters. The rainy month is September, with an average of 123 mm rainfall, and the driest is January, with 21 mm rainfall.

Forty-six African Pygmies, mostly women and children, were killed (some beheaded) by ADF fighters in Ambedi village, Irumu Territory on January 15, 2021. Two rebels were arrested.
