= Djugu territory =

District of Ituri Province, DR Congo

Djugu Wilaya ya Djugu (Swahili)
- Territory
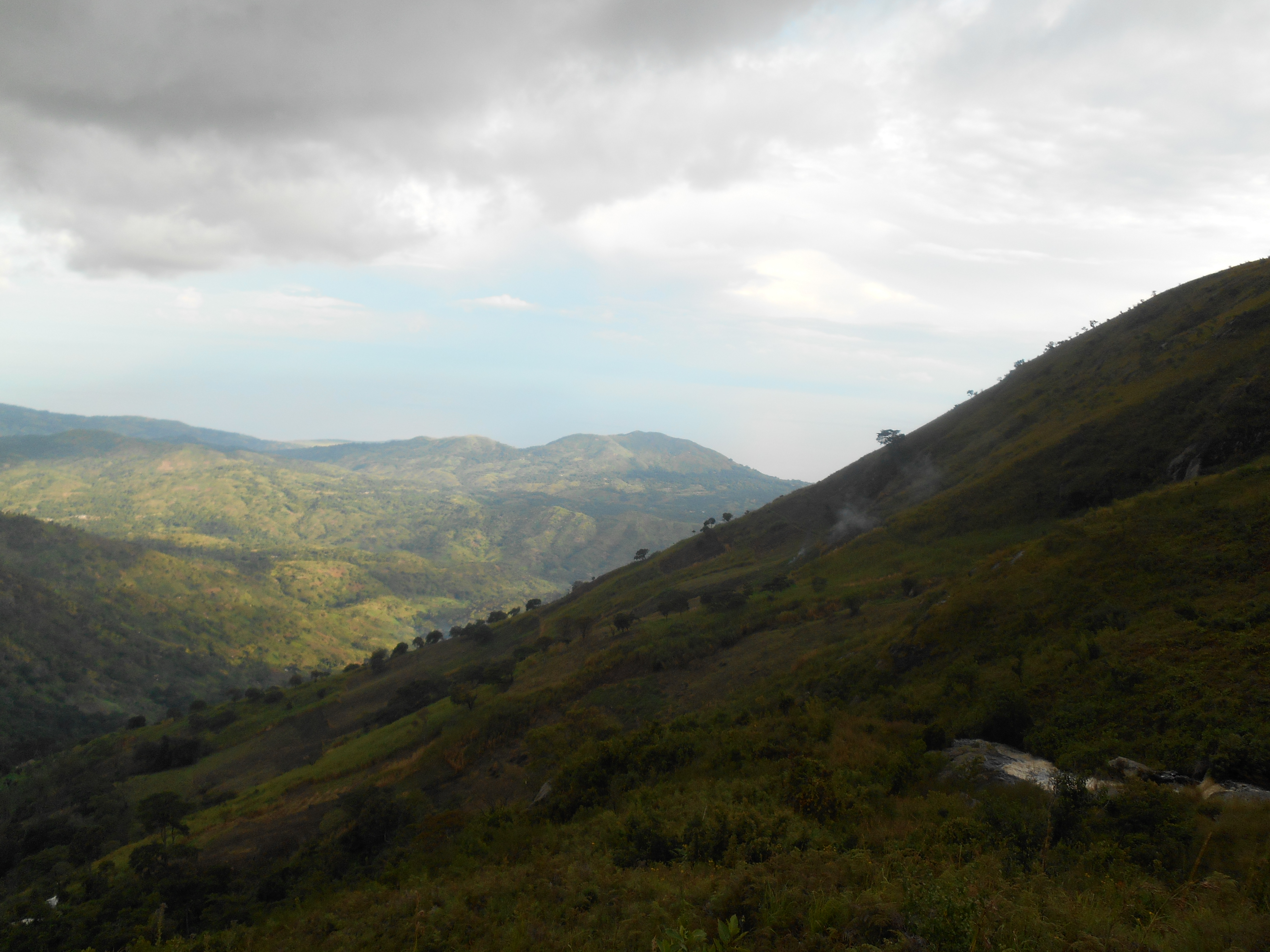
- View of Lake Albert from Djugu territory
- Interactive map of Djugu
- Location in DR Congo
- Coordinates: 1°55′58.8″N 30°28′58.8″E
- Country: DR Congo
- Province: Ituri
- Seat: Djugu

Government
  - Territory administrator: Colonel Ruphin Mapela
- Time zone: UTC+2 (CAT)

Djugu territory (French: Territoire de Djugu) is a district of Ituri, Democratic Republic of the Congo. Its capital is also named Djugu.

== History ==
Armed conflict first appeared in Djugu in December 2017, resulting in the displacement of 20,000 people. Since then 4,000 people have been killed by various armed organizations, including CODECO.

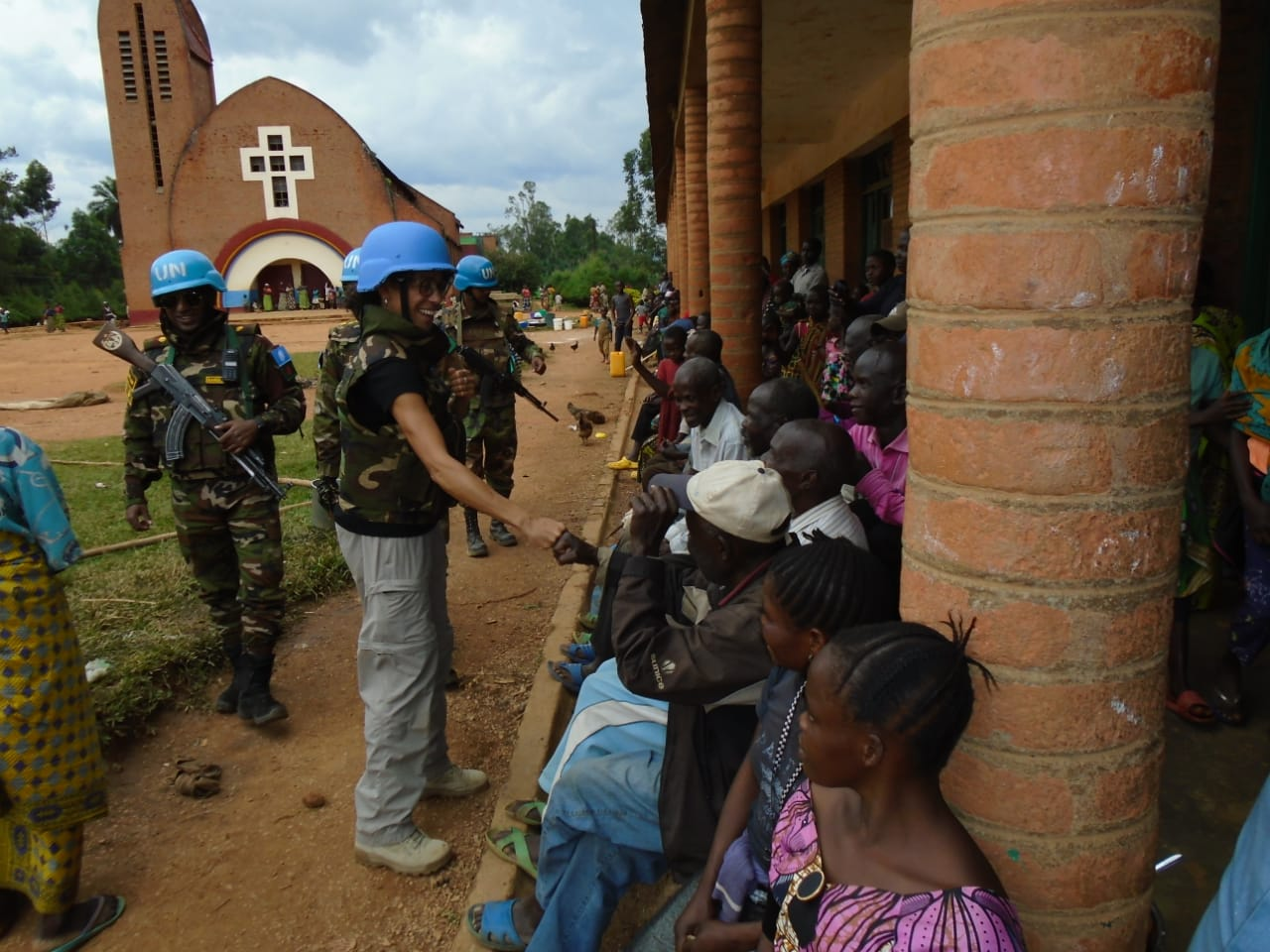
MONUSCO troops in Kobu, 2021.

In 2021, during an ongoing insurgency by Islamist rebels, Djugu fell into a humanitarian crisis. Since November 2021, rebels have attacked several separate IDP sites, including Drodro, a camp for internally displaced people, resulting in heavy casualties. At least 58 civilians were killed since October. On 2 February 2022, a CODECO attack killed over 60 people. A few weeks later, CODECO slew 18 people in the village of Banyali Kilo.

600,000 people living in Djugu territory are IDPs, 85,000 of whom became displaced in 2021.

In March 2023, CODECO abducted and killed 17 people who were driving on a road in Djugu. On February 14th 2024, CODECO killed at least 12 people, and kidnapped another 16 near a gold mine in Djugu. Later in the same week on February 17th, another 15 people were killed on a road near the village of Tali.

== List of localities ==
- Banyali Kilo
- Djugu
- Drodro
- Fataki
- Iga Barrière
- Jina
- Kobu
- Ladejo
- Lopa
- Roe
