= 2001 IAAF World Cross Country Championships – Junior women's race =

Junior women's race at the 2001 IAAF World Cross Country Championships
- Organisers: IAAF
- Edition: 29th
- Date: March 24
- Host city: Ostend, West Flanders, Belgium
- Venue: Hippodrome Wellington
- Events: 1
- Distances: 5.9 km – Junior women
- Participation: 126 athletes from 32 nations

The Junior women's race at the 2001 IAAF World Cross Country Championships was held at the Hippodrome Wellington in Ostend (Oostende), Belgium, on March 24, 2001. Reports on the event were given in The New York Times, in the Herald, and for the IAAF.

Complete results for individuals, for teams, medallists, and the results of British athletes who took part were published.

== Race results ==
=== Junior women's race (5.9 km) ===
==== Individual ====
| Rank | Athlete | Country | Time |
|---|---|---|---|
| 1st place, gold medalist(s) | Viola Kibiwott | Kenya | 22:05 |
| 2nd place, silver medalist(s) | Abebech Nigussie | Ethiopia | 22:05 |
| 3rd place, bronze medalist(s) | Aster Bacha | Ethiopia | 22:05 |
| 4 | Vivian Cheruiyot | Kenya | 22:06 |
| 5 | Tirunesh Dibaba | Ethiopia | 22:08 |
| 6 | Tereza Yohanes | Ethiopia | 22:10 |
| 7 | Fridah Domongole | Kenya | 22:12 |
| 8 | Sally Kipyego | Kenya | 22:22 |
| 9 | Peninah Chepchumba | Kenya | 22:24 |
| 10 | Mestawat Tufa | Ethiopia | 22:24 |
| 11 | Naoko Sakata | Japan | 22:36 |
| 12 | Christine Kalmer | South Africa | 22:45 |
| 13 | Tomomi Tagao | Japan | 22:46 |
| 14 | Melissa Rollison | Australia | 22:52 |
| 15 | Anna Ndege | Tanzania | 22:53 |
| 16 | Alice Timbilil | Kenya | 22:54 |
| 17 | Emi Ikeda | Japan | 23:00 |
| 18 | Mika Matsumoto | Japan | 23:15 |
| 19 | Georgie Clarke | Australia | 23:21 |
| 20 | Simret Sultan | Eritrea | 23:24 |
| 21 | Ruth McDonnell | Australia | 23:25 |
| 22 | Elvan Can | Turkey | 23:30 |
| 23 | Emma Ward | United Kingdom | 23:31 |
| 24 | Lina Usmanova | Russia | 23:34 |
| 25 | Mikayo Udo | Japan | 23:36 |
| 26 | Lauren King | Canada | 23:37 |
| 27 | Diane Nukuri | Burundi | 23:37 |
| 28 | Christel Arnold | South Africa | 23:44 |
| 29 | Samira Afettouche | Algeria | 23:44 |
| 30 | Inga Abitova | Russia | 23:45 |
| 31 | Trish Nolan | Canada | 23:47 |
| 32 | Louise Damen | United Kingdom | 23:48 |
| 33 | Fatiha Bahi | Algeria | 23:52 |
| 34 | Maria Yohana Amosi | Tanzania | 23:53 |
| 35 | Hiromi Koga | Japan | 23:55 |
| 36 | Mieke Geens | Belgium | 23:58 |
| 37 | Lize-Mari Venter | South Africa | 23:59 |
| 38 | Collette Fagan | United Kingdom | 24:02 |
| 39 | Simret Asmerom | Eritrea | 24:09 |
| 40 | Evelien Hofmans | Belgium | 24:10 |
| 41 | Tatyana Petrova | Russia | 24:11 |
| 42 | Alicia Craig | United States | 24:12 |
| 43 | Birgül Özcan | Turkey | 24:15 |
| 44 | Julie Coulaud | France | 24:16 |
| 45 | Jane Makombe | Zimbabwe | 24:16 |
| 46 | Elodie Mené | France | 24:17 |
| 47 | Laura Zeigle | United States | 24:17 |
| 48 | Faye Fullerton | United Kingdom | 24:18 |
| 49 | Eleonora Riga | Italy | 24:21 |
| 50 | Isabel Macías | Spain | 24:21 |
| 51 | Fiona Crombie | New Zealand | 24:22 |
| 52 | Amparo Menéndez | Spain | 24:22 |
| 53 | Joanna Wall | Australia | 24:23 |
| 54 | Linda Hadjar | France | 24:29 |
| 55 | Lakshmaiah Manjula | India | 24:29 |
| 56 | Alba García | Spain | 24:29 |
| 57 | Beatrice Lanza | Italy | 24:30 |
| 58 | Saloua Hassani | Algeria | 24:33 |
| 59 | Lynelle Blignaut | South Africa | 24:33 |
| 60 | Francesca Smiderle | Italy | 24:34 |
| 61 | Victoria Chang | United States | 24:37 |
| 62 | Elizabeth Lilley | United Kingdom | 24:41 |
| 63 | Matirinta Mota | Lesotho | 24:43 |
| 64 | Eden Tesfalem | Eritrea | 24:43 |
| 65 | Alisha Williams | United States | 24:45 |
| 66 | Henrietta Freeman | United Kingdom | 24:45 |
| 67 | Arzu Berk | Turkey | 24:50 |
| 68 | Ljiljana Culibrk | Croatia | 24:50 |
| 69 | Marina Ivanova | Russia | 24:51 |
| 70 | Dulce Félix | Portugal | 24:53 |
| 71 | Lebogang Phalula | South Africa | 24:56 |
| 72 | Alicia González | Spain | 24:58 |
| 73 | Michelle Carson | Canada | 25:00 |
| 74 | Emily Blakeslee | United States | 25:01 |
| 75 | Valeria Marinoni | Italy | 25:01 |
| 76 | Türkan Erişmiş | Turkey | 25:01 |
| 77 | Nadia Rodríguez | Argentina | 25:02 |
| 78 | Seham El Agizy | Egypt | 25:02 |
| 79 | Rosemary Grosso | Italy | 25:04 |
| 80 | Carol Henry | Canada | 25:09 |
| 81 | Meriem Benzerga | Algeria | 25:10 |
| 82 | Megan Metcalfe | Canada | 25:10 |
| 83 | Preda Sreedharan | India | 25:12 |
| 84 | Widad Mendil | Algeria | 25:14 |
| 85 | Nagamani Basa | India | 25:14 |
| 86 | Pilar Mendoza | Spain | 25:16 |
| 87 | Patricia Lobo | Brazil | 25:20 |
| 88 | Lesley Shannon | Ireland | 25:24 |
| 89 | Lies Delameilleure | Belgium | 25:25 |
| 90 | Sónia Fernandes | Portugal | 25:31 |
| 91 | Agnès Portier | France | 25:33 |
| 92 | Karina Pérez | Mexico | 25:36 |
| 93 | Yuliya Alyoshina | Turkmenistan | 25:38 |
| 94 | Natalya Alekseyeva | Belarus | 25:38 |
| 95 | Daphrose Ndayikunda | Burundi | 25:40 |
| 96 | Belén Iñigo | Spain | 25:42 |
| 97 | Anne Gauthier | France | 25:46 |
| 98 | Fionnuala Britton | Ireland | 25:46 |
| 99 | Ann Schreurs | Belgium | 25:50 |
| 100 | Natallia Yakhimovich | Belarus | 25:51 |
| 101 | Michelle de la Vina | United States | 25:56 |
| 102 | Sophie Christiaens | Belgium | 25:59 |
| 103 | Eliane Pereira | Brazil | 25:59 |
| 104 | Karina Córdoba | Argentina | 25:59 |
| 105 | Sara Abou Hassan | Egypt | 26:12 |
| 106 | Dimple Naidu | India | 26:19 |
| 107 | Doaa Adel | Egypt | 26:20 |
| 108 | Michaela Lynn | Ireland | 26:20 |
| 109 | Shaimaa Ibrahim | Egypt | 26:35 |
| 110 | Ava Hutchinson | Ireland | 26:40 |
| 111 | Irene González | Mexico | 26:40 |
| 112 | Stephanie Hirtle | Canada | 26:46 |
| 113 | Zulma Morabes | Argentina | 26:52 |
| 114 | Gizelle de Castro | Brazil | 27:07 |
| 115 | Alena Kutskevich | Belarus | 27:18 |
| 116 | Yuliya Krepina | Uzbekistan | 27:30 |
| 117 | Ana Rosa Fuentes | Mexico | 28:19 |
| 118 | Lemlem Bereket | Eritrea | 28:33 |
| 119 | Gulya Imomova | Uzbekistan | 28:34 |
| 120 | Svetlana Barkalova | Uzbekistan | 28:43 |
| 121 | Jorgelina Litterini | Argentina | 29:01 |
| 122 | Svetlana Mansurova | Uzbekistan | 30:04 |
| 123 | Dinara Nerziyeva | Turkmenistan | 30:51 |
| — | Wahiba Ifftissen | Algeria | DNF |
| — | Natallia Tsyvaka | Belarus | DNF |
| — | Tatiane Sá | Brazil | DNF |
| — | Anastasiya Pustarnakova | Belarus | DNS |
| — | Hawa Hussein | Tanzania | DNS |
| — | Zakia Mrisho | Tanzania | DNS |
| — | Olivia Chikotore | Zimbabwe | DNS |

==== Teams ====
| Rank | Team | Points |
|---|---|---|
| 1st place, gold medalist(s) | Ethiopia: Abebech Nigussie / 2; Aster Bacha / 3; Tirunesh Dibaba / 5; Tereza Yohanes / 6; (Mestawat Tufa) / (10) | 16 |
| 2nd place, silver medalist(s) | Kenya: Viola Kibiwott / 1; Vivian Cheruiyot / 4; Fridah Domongole / 7; Sally Kipyego / 8; (Peninah Chepchumba) / (9); (Alice Timbilil) / (16) | 20 |
| 3rd place, bronze medalist(s) | Japan: Naoko Sakata / 11; Tomomi Tagao / 13; Emi Ikeda / 17; Mika Matsumoto / 18; (Mikayo Udo) / (25); (Hiromi Koga) / (35) | 59 |
| 4 | Australia: Melissa Rollison / 14; Georgie Clarke / 19; Ruth McDonnell / 21; Joanna Wall / 53 | 107 |
| 5 | South Africa: Christine Kalmer / 12; Christel Arnold / 28; Lize-Mari Venter / 37; Lynelle Blignaut / 59; (Lebogang Phalula) / (71) | 136 |
| 6 | United Kingdom: Emma Ward / 23; Louise Damen / 32; Collette Fagan / 38; Faye Fullerton / 48; (Elizabeth Lilley) / (62); (Henrietta Freeman) / (66) | 141 |
| 7 | Russia: Lina Usmanova / 24; Inga Abitova / 30; Tatyana Petrova / 41; Marina Ivanova / 69 | 164 |
| 8 | Algeria: Samira Afettouche / 29; Fatiha Bahi / 33; Saloua Hassani / 58; Meriem Benzerga / 81; (Widad Mendil) / (84); (Wahiba Ifftissen) / (DNF) | 201 |
| 9 | Turkey: Elvan Can / 22; Birgül Özcan / 43; Arzu Berk / 67; Türkan Erişmiş / 76 | 208 |
| 10 | Canada: Lauren King / 26; Trish Nolan / 31; Michelle Carson / 73; Carol Henry / 80; (Megan Metcalfe) / (82); (Stephanie Hirtle) / (112) | 210 |
| 11 | United States: Alicia Craig / 42; Laura Zeigle / 47; Victoria Chang / 61; Alisha Williams / 65; (Emily Blakeslee) / (74); (Michelle de la Vina) / (101) | 215 |
| 12 | Spain: Isabel Macías / 50; Amparo Menéndez / 52; Alba García / 56; Alicia González / 72; (Pilar Mendoza) / (86); (Belén Iñigo) / (96) | 230 |
| 13 | France: Julie Coulaud / 44; Elodie Mené / 46; Linda Hadjar / 54; Agnès Portier / 91; (Anne Gauthier) / (97) | 235 |
| 14 | Italy: Eleonora Riga / 49; Beatrice Lanza / 57; Francesca Smiderle / 60; Valeria Marinoni / 75; (Rosemary Grosso) / (79) | 241 |
| 15 | Eritrea: Simret Sultan / 20; Simret Asmerom / 39; Eden Tesfalem / 64; Lemlem Bereket / 118 | 241 |
| 16 | Belgium: Mieke Geens / 36; Evelien Hofmans / 40; Lies Delameilleure / 89; Ann Schreurs / 99; (Sophie Christiaens) / (102) | 264 |
| 17 | India: Lakshmaiah Manjula / 55; Preda Sreedharan / 83; Nagamani Basa / 85; Dimple Naidu / 106 | 329 |
| 18 | Egypt: Seham El Agizy / 78; Sara Abou Hassan / 105; Doaa Adel / 107; Shaimaa Ibrahim / 109 | 399 |
| 19 | Ireland: Lesley Shannon / 88; Fionnuala Britton / 98; Michaela Lynn / 108; Ava Hutchinson / 110 | 404 |
| 20 | Argentina: Nadia Rodríguez / 77; Karina Córdoba / 104; Zulma Morabes / 113; Jorgelina Litterini / 121 | 415 |
| 21 | Uzbekistan: Yuliya Krepina / 116; Gulya Imomova / 119; Svetlana Barkalova / 120; Svetlana Mansurova / 122 | 477 |
| DNF | Brazil: (Patricia Lobo) / (87); (Eliane Pereira) / (103); (Gizelle de Castro) / (114); (Tatiane Sá) / (DNF) | DNF |
| DNF | Belarus: (Natalya Alekseyeva) / (94); (Natallia Yakhimovich) / (100); (Alena Kutskevich) / (115); (Natallia Tsyvaka) / (DNF) | DNF |

- Note: Athletes in parentheses did not score for the team result

== Participation ==
An unofficial count yields the participation of 126 athletes from 32 countries in the Junior women's race. This is in agreement with the official numbers as published.

- Algeria (6)
- Argentina (4)
- Australia (4)
- Belarus (4)
- Belgium (5)
- Brazil (4)
- Burundi (2)
- Canada (6)
- Croatia (1)
- Egypt (4)
- Eritrea (4)
- Ethiopia (5)
- France (5)
- India (4)
- Ireland (4)
- Italy (5)
- Japan (6)
- Kenya (6)
- Lesotho (1)
- Mexico (3)
- New Zealand (1)
- Portugal (2)
- Russia (4)
- South Africa (5)
- Spain (6)
- Tanzania (2)
- Turkey (4)
- Turkmenistan (2)
- United Kingdom (6)
- United States (6)
- Uzbekistan (4)
- Zimbabwe (1)

== See also ==
- 2001 IAAF World Cross Country Championships – Senior men's race
- 2001 IAAF World Cross Country Championships – Men's short race
- 2001 IAAF World Cross Country Championships – Junior men's race
- 2001 IAAF World Cross Country Championships – Senior women's race
- 2001 IAAF World Cross Country Championships – Women's short race
