= 2007 NCAA Division I Indoor Track and Field Championships =

- Dates: March 9-10, 2007
- Host city: Fayetteville, Arkansas; University of Arkansas
- Venue: Randal Tyson Track Center
- Events: 32

The 2007 NCAA Division I Indoor Track and Field Championships was the 43rd NCAA Men's Division I Indoor Track and Field Championships and the 26th NCAA Women's Division I Indoor Track and Field Championships, held at the Randal Tyson Track Center in Fayetteville, Arkansas near the campus of the host school, the University of Arkansas. In total, thirty-two different men's and women's indoor track and field events were contested from March 9 to March 10, 2007.

== Team scores ==
- Note: Top 10 only
- Scoring: 10 points for a 1st-place finish in an event, 8 points for 2nd, 6 points for 3rd, 5 points for 4th, 4 points for 5th, 3 points for 6th, 2 points for 7th, and 1 point for 8th.
- Full results

=== Men's teams ===
| Rank | University | Points |
|---|---|---|
| 1 | Wisconsin | 40 |
| 2 | Florida State | 35 |
| 3 | Texas | 34 |
| 4 | Stanford | 28 |
| 5 | Auburn | 25 |
| 6 | Michigan | 23 |
| 7 | Arkansas | 22 |
| 7 | Washington | 22 |
| 9 | Northern Iowa | 21.50 |
| 10 | Baylor | 21 |
| 10 | Tennessee | 21 |

=== Women's teams ===
| Rank | University | Points |
|---|---|---|
| 1 | Arizona State | 38 |
| 2 | LSU | 33 |
| 3 | Tennessee | 30 |
| 4 | Georgia | 28 |
| 5 | Auburn | 26 |
| 6 | Stanford | 24 |
| 7 | UCLA | 23 |
| 8 | Texas | 22 |
| 9 | Michigan | 21 |
| 10 | South Carolina | 20 |
| 10 | Texas Tech | 20 |

== Results ==
=== Men's results ===
==== 60 meters ====
| Rank | Name | University | Time | Notes |
|---|---|---|---|---|
| 1st place, gold medalist(s) | Travis Padgett | Clemson | 6.56 | |
| 2nd place, silver medalist(s) | Demi Omole | Wisconsin | 6.57 | |
| 3rd place, bronze medalist(s) | Jacoby Ford | Clemson | 6.60 | |
| 4 | Greg Bolden | Florida State | 6.63 | 6.621 |
| 5 | Ibrahim Kabia Sierra Leone | Minnesota | 6.63 | 6.624 |
| 6 | Rubin Williams | Tennessee | 6.67 | |
| 7 | Arel Gordon | Maine | 6.71 | |
| 8 | Walter Dix | Florida State | 7.09 | |

==== 200 meters ====
| Rank | Name | University | Time | Heat |
|---|---|---|---|---|
| 1st place, gold medalist(s) | Walter Dix | Florida State | 20.32 | 2 |
| 2nd place, silver medalist(s) | Rubin Williams | Tennessee | 20.63 | 2 |
| 3rd place, bronze medalist(s) | Chris Dykes | Texas A&M | 20.67 | 1 |
| 4 | Charles Clark | Florida State | 20.75 | 1 |
| 5 | Reggie Witherspoon | Baylor | 20.77 | 2 |
| 6 | Evander Wells | Tennessee | 20.80 | 1 |
| 7 | Arman Dixon | Sacred Heart | 20.94 | 2 |
| 8 | Trey Harts | Baylor | 21.09 | 1 |

==== 400 meters ====
| Rank | Name | University | Time | Notes |
|---|---|---|---|---|
| 1st place, gold medalist(s) | Ricardo Chambers Jamaica | Florida State | 45.65 | 2 |
| 2nd place, silver medalist(s) | Aaron Buzard | Minnesota | 45.86 | 2 |
| 3rd place, bronze medalist(s) | Quentin Summers | Baylor | 46.07 | 1 |
| 4 | Michael Bingham United Kingdom | Wake Forest | 46.12 | 2 |
| 5 | Gakologelwang Masheto Botswana | Illinois | 46.14 | 1 |
| 6 | Erison Hurtault Dominica | Columbia | 46.48 | 2 |
| 7 | Calvin Smith | Florida | 46.50 | 1 |
| 8 | Andretti Bain Bahamas | Oral Roberts | 46.70 | 1 |

==== 800 meters ====
| Rank | Name | University | Time | Notes |
|---|---|---|---|---|
| 1st place, gold medalist(s) | Ryan Brown | Washington | 1:48.40 | |
| 2nd place, silver medalist(s) | Andrew Ellerton | Michigan | 1:48.55 | |
| 3rd place, bronze medalist(s) | Kyle Smith | Northern Iowa | 1:49.09 | |
| 4 | Austin Abbott | Washington | 1:49.65 | |
| 5 | Jamaal James Trinidad and Tobago | LSU | 1:49.69 | |
| 6 | Paul Harris | Navy | 1:50.02 | |
| 7 | Shaun Smith | Oral Roberts | 1:50.41 | |
| 8 | Thomas Chamney Ireland | Notre Dame | 1:50.74 | |

==== Mile ====
| Rank | Name | University | Time | Notes |
|---|---|---|---|---|
| 1st place, gold medalist(s) | Leonel Manzano | Texas | 3:59.90 | |
| 2nd place, silver medalist(s) | Russell Brown | Stanford | 4:00.84 | |
| 3rd place, bronze medalist(s) | Stephen Pifer | Colorado | 4:00.93 6 | |
| 4 | Garrett Heath | Stanford | 4:00.99 5 | |
| 5 | Pablo Solares Mexico | Rice | 4:01.24 4 | |
| 6 | Scott Overall United Kingdom | Butler | 4:01.25 3 | |
| 7 | Sam Bair | Pittsburgh | 4:01.99 2 | |
| 8 | David Nightingale | Princeton | 4:03.13 1 | |
| 9 | Emmanuel Bor | Alabama | 4:03.51 | |
| 10 | Jake Watson | Notre Dame | 4:03.97 | |

==== 3000 meters ====
| Rank | Name | University | Time | Notes |
|---|---|---|---|---|
| 1st place, gold medalist(s) | Lopez Lomong | Northern Arizona | 7:49.74 | |
| 2nd place, silver medalist(s) | Chris Solinsky | Wisconsin | 7:51.69 | |
| 3rd place, bronze medalist(s) | Josh McDougal | Liberty | 7:55.40 | |
| 4 | Galen Rupp | Oregon | 7:56.79 | |
| 5 | Obed Mutanya Zambia | Arizona | 7:57.21 | |
| 6 | Martin Fagan Ireland | Providence | 7:57.88 | |
| 7 | Colby Wissel | Kansas | 7:58.42 | |
| 8 | Peter Kosgei | Arkansas | 8:03.02 | |
| 9 | Itay Magidi Israel | Clemson | 8:04.92 | |
| 10 | Aaron Aguayo | Arizona State | 8:08.15 | |

==== 5000 meters ====
| Rank | Name | University | Time | Notes |
|---|---|---|---|---|
| 1st place, gold medalist(s) | Chris Solinsky | Wisconsin | 13:38.61 | |
| 2nd place, silver medalist(s) | Peter Kosgei | Arkansas | 13:39.88 | |
| 3rd place, bronze medalist(s) | Galen Rupp | Oregon | 13:40.38 6 | |
| 4 | Samuel Chelanga | FDU | 13:47.39 5 | |
| 5 | Tim Nelson | Wisconsin | 13:48.08 4 | |
| 6 | Kevin Chelimo Kenya | Texas Tech | 13:48.88 3 | |
| 7 | Sean Quigley | La Salle | 13:49.62 2 | |
| 8 | Josh McDougal | Liberty | 13:49.97 1 | |
| 9 | Stephen Samoei | UTEP | 13:51.24 | |
| 10 | Ian Burrell | Georgia | 13:56.26 | |

==== 60 meters hurdles ====
| Rank | Name | University | Time | Notes |
|---|---|---|---|---|
| 1st place, gold medalist(s) | Jeff Porter | Michigan | 7.64 | |
| 2nd place, silver medalist(s) | Alleyne Lett Grenada | LSU | 7.70 | 7.692 |
| 3rd place, bronze medalist(s) | Dominic Berger | Maryland | 7.70 | 7.696 |
| 4 | John Yarbrough | Mississippi | 7.73 | 7.727 |
| 5 | Marlon Odom | Texas Tech | 7.73 | 7.730 |
| 6 | Thomas Hilliard | South Carolina | 7.78 | |
| 7 | Mike Wray | Pittsburgh | 7.92 | |

==== High jump ====
| Rank | Name | University | Height | Notes |
|---|---|---|---|---|
| 1st place, gold medalist(s) | Donald Thomas Bahamas | Auburn | 2.33 m (7 ft 7 1/2 in) | |
| 2nd place, silver medalist(s) | Dusty Jonas | Nebraska | 2.25 m (7 ft 4 1/2 in) | |
| 3rd place, bronze medalist(s) | Scott Sellers | Kansas State | 2.22 m (7 ft 3 1/4 in) | |
| 4 | Andra Manson | Texas | 2.22 m (7 ft 3 1/4 in) | |
| 5 | Ryan Fritz | Penn State | 2.22 m (7 ft 3 1/4 in) | |
| 6 | Ed Wright | California | 2.19 m (7 ft 2 in) | |
| 7 | Will Littleton | Texas-Pan Am | 2.19 m (7 ft 2 in) | |
| 8 | Mickael Hanany France | UTEP | 2.14 m (7 ft 1/4 in) | |
| 8 | Ivan Diggs | Houston | 2.14 m (7 ft 1/4 in) | |
| 10 | Norris Frederick | Washington | 2.14 m (7 ft 1/4 in) | |
| 10 | David Pendergrass | BYU | 2.14 m (7 ft 1/4 in) | |

==== Pole vault ====
| Rank | Name | University | Height | Notes |
|---|---|---|---|---|
| 1st place, gold medalist(s) | Brad Gebauer | McNeese St. | 5.50 m (18 ft 1/2 in) | |
| 2nd place, silver medalist(s) | Rory Quiller | Binghamton | 5.50 m (18 ft 1/2 in) | |
| 3rd place, bronze medalist(s) | Tyson Byers | Washington St. | 5.50 m (18 ft 1/2 in) | |
| 4 | Chip Heuser | Oklahoma | 5.40 m (17 ft 8 1/2 in) | |
| 5 | Michael Hogue | Tennessee | 5.40 m (17 ft 8 1/2 in) | |
| 6 | Mark Johnson | Auburn | 5.40 m (17 ft 8 1/2 in) | |
| 7 | Andre Poljanec | Northern Iowa | 5.30 m (17 ft 4 1/2 in) | |
| 7 | Thorsten Mueller | Virginia Tech | 5.30 m (17 ft 4 1/2 in) | |
| 9 | Jarno Kivioja | Northern Iowa | 5.30 m (17 ft 4 1/2 in) | |
| 10 | Graeme Hoste | Stanford | 5.30 m (17 ft 4 1/2 in) | |

==== Long jump ====
| Rank | Name | University | Distance | Notes |
|---|---|---|---|---|
| 1st place, gold medalist(s) | Tone Belt | Louisville | 7.97 m (26 ft 1 3/4 in) | |
| 2nd place, silver medalist(s) | Trey Hardee | Texas | 7.83 m (25 ft 8 1/4 in) | |
| 3rd place, bronze medalist(s) | Alain Bailey Jamaica | Arkansas | 7.79 m (25 ft 6 1/2 in) | |
| 4 | Scott Mayle | Ohio | 7.78 m (25 ft 6 1/4 in) | |
| 5 | Will Coppage | LSU | 7.78 m (25 ft 6 1/4 in) | |
| 6 | Norris Frederick | Washington | 7.65 m (25 ft 1 in) | |
| 7 | Matt Turner | Arizona St. | 7.63 m (25 ft 1/4 in) | |
| 8 | Mychael Stewart | Arkansas | 7.62 m (25 ft 0 in) | |
| 9 | Mike T. Morrison | Florida | 7.61 m (24 ft 11 1/2 in) | |
| 10 | Kiwann Lawson | Indiana | 7.49 m (24 ft 6 3/4 in) | |

==== Triple jump ====
| Rank | Name | University | Distance | Notes |
|---|---|---|---|---|
| 1st place, gold medalist(s) | Andre Black | Louisville | 16.29 m (53 ft 5 1/4 in) | |
| 2nd place, silver medalist(s) | Muhammad Halim | Cornell | 16.24 m (53 ft 3 1/4 in) | |
| 3rd place, bronze medalist(s) | Nkosinza Balumbu | Arkansas | 16.19 m (53 ft 1 1/4 in) | |
| 4 | Ronald Carter | Long Beach | 15.95 m (52 ft 3 3/4 in) | |
| 5 | Ray Taylor | Cornell | 15.81 m (51 ft 10 1/4 in) | |
| 6 | Kyle Jenkins | Indiana | 15.77 m (51 ft 8 3/4 in) | |
| 7 | Michael Whitehead | Michigan | 15.75 m (51 ft 8 in) | |
| 8 | Ryan McCoy | George Mason | 15.66 m (51 ft 4 1/2 in) | |
| 9 | Zuheir Sharif | Texas A&M | 15.59 m (51 ft 1 3/4 in) | |
| 10 | Jason Bell | Clemson | 15.16 m (49 ft 8 3/4 in) | |

==== Shot put ====
| Rank | Name | University | Distance | Notes |
|---|---|---|---|---|
| 1st place, gold medalist(s) | Noah Bryant | USC | 20.55 m (67 ft 5 in) | |
| 2nd place, silver medalist(s) | Russ Winger | Idaho | 20.52 m (67 ft 3 3/4 in) | |
| 3rd place, bronze medalist(s) | Ryan Whiting | Arizona St. | 20.01 m (65 ft 7 3/4 in) | |
| 4 | Milan Jotanovic | Manhattan | 19.56 m (64 ft 2 in) | |
| 5 | Adam Kuehl | Arizona | 19.40 m (63 ft 7 3/4 in) | |
| 6 | Shawn Best | Arizona | 19.36 m (63 ft 6 in) | |
| 7 | Mitchell Pope | NC State | 19.28 m (63 ft 3 in) | |
| 8 | Wes Stockbarger | Florida | 19.22 m (63 ft 1/2 in) | |
| 9 | Justin Clickett | Virginia Tech | 18.88 m (61 ft 11 1/4 in) | |
| 10 | Dave Nichols | Sac State | 18.74 m (61 ft 5 3/4 in) | |

==== Weight throw ====
| Rank | Name | University | Distance | Notes |
|---|---|---|---|---|
| 1st place, gold medalist(s) | Egor Agafonov | Kansas | 23.60 m (77 ft 5 in) | |
| 2nd place, silver medalist(s) | Cory Martin | Auburn | 23.27 m (76 ft 4 in) | |
| 3rd place, bronze medalist(s) | Nick Owens | North Carolina | 21.71 m (71 ft 2 1/2 in) | |
| 4 | Eric Frasure | East Carolina | 21.58 m (70 ft 9 1/2 in) | |
| 5 | Jake Dunkleberger | Auburn | 21.57 m (70 ft 9 in) | |
| 6 | Matt Wauters | Idaho | 21.27 m (69 ft 9 1/4 in) | |
| 7 | Chris Rohr | Missouri | 21.13 m (69 ft 3 3/4 in) | |
| 8 | Arthur Turland | Louisville | 20.99 m (68 ft 10 1/4 in) | |
| 9 | Tyler Dailey | Missouri | 20.87 m (68 ft 5 1/2 in) | |
| 10 | Terrance Myers | East Carolina | 20.86 m (68 ft 5 1/4 in) | |

=== Women's results ===
==== w60 meters ====
| Rank | Name | University | Time | Notes |
|---|---|---|---|---|
| 1st place, gold medalist(s) | Kerron Stewart Jamaica | Auburn | 7.15 | |
| 2nd place, silver medalist(s) | Courtney Champion | Tennessee | 7.19 | |
| 3rd place, bronze medalist(s) | Kelly Ann Baptiste Trinidad and Tobago | LSU | 7.27 | |
| 4 | Gloria Asumnu | Tulane | 7.30 | |
| 5 | Alexandria Anderson | Texas | 7.32 | |
| 6 | Chauntae Bayne | Texas | 7.33 | |
| 7 | Simone Facey Jamaica | Texas A&M | 7.34 | |
| 8 | Sherry Fletcher Grenada | LSU | 7.36 | |

==== w200 meters ====
| Rank | Name | University | Time | Notes | Heat |
|---|---|---|---|---|---|
| 1st place, gold medalist(s) | Kerron Stewart Jamaica | Auburn | 22.59 | | 2 |
| 2nd place, silver medalist(s) | Kelly Ann Baptiste Trinidad and Tobago | LSU | 22.91 | | 2 |
| 3rd place, bronze medalist(s) | Courtney Champion | Tennessee | 22.92 | | 1 |
| 4 | Shareese Woods | UNC-Charlotte | 22.97 | 22.963 | 1 |
| 5 | Simone Facey Jamaica | Texas A&M | 22.97 | 22.968 | 2 |
| 6 | Ebonie Floyd | Houston | 22.98 | | 1 |
| 7 | Virgil Hodge Saint Kitts and Nevis | TCU | 22.99 | | 1 |

==== w400 meters ====
| Rank | Name | University | Time | Heat |
|---|---|---|---|---|
| 1st place, gold medalist(s) | Natasha Hastings | South Carolina | 50.80 | 2 |
| 2nd place, silver medalist(s) | Kineke Alexander Saint Vincent and the Grenadines | Iowa | 51.48 | 2 |
| 3rd place, bronze medalist(s) | Ashlee Kidd | Georgia Tech | 51.96 | 1 |
| 4 | Ginou Etienne Haiti | Miami | 52.47 | 1 |
| 5 | Jessica Cousins | Arkansas | 52.95 | 1 |
| 6 | Nina Gilbert | LA Tech | 53.21 | 1 |
| 7 | Shana Cox | Penn State | 53.25 | 2 |
| 8 | Jenna Harris | Ohio State | 53.31 | 2 |

==== w800 meters ====
| Rank | Name | University | Time | Notes |
|---|---|---|---|---|
| 1st place, gold medalist(s) | Alysia Johnson | California | 2:03.47 | |
| 2nd place, silver medalist(s) | Rebekah Noble | Oregon | 2:04.70 | |
| 3rd place, bronze medalist(s) | Heather Dorniden | Minnesota | 2:04.87 | |
| 4 | Katie Erdman | Michigan | 2:05.53 | |
| 5 | Morgan Uceny | Cornell | 2:05.95 | |
| 6 | Katya Kostetskaya | Texas St. | 2:06.10 | |
| 7 | Briene Simmons | Penn State | 2:06.12 | |
| 8 | Fatimoh Muhammed | UTEP | 2:06.41 | |

==== wMile ====
| Rank | Name | University | Time | Notes |
|---|---|---|---|---|
| 1st place, gold medalist(s) | Shannon Rowbury | Duke | 4:42.17 | |
| 2nd place, silver medalist(s) | Allie Bohannon | UCLA | 4:43.36 | |
| 3rd place, bronze medalist(s) | Nicole Edwards Canada | Michigan | 4:44.89 | |
| 4 | Barbara Parker United Kingdom | Florida State | 4:45.97 | |
| 5 | Jennie Twitchell | Utah State | 4:47.09 | |
| 6 | Sarah Bowman | Tennessee | 4:47.14 | |
| 7 | Natalie Picchetti | Georgia | 4:48.60 | |
| 8 | Meghan Armstrong | Iowa | 4:49.07 | |
| 9 | Amanda Miller | Washington | 4:49.13 | |
| 10 | Laura Rolf | Valparaiso | 4:49.95 | |

==== w3000 meters ====
| Rank | Name | University | Time | Notes |
|---|---|---|---|---|
| 1st place, gold medalist(s) | Sally Kipyego | Texas Tech | 9:02.05 | |
| 2nd place, silver medalist(s) | Shannon Rowbury | Duke | 9:02.73 | |
| 3rd place, bronze medalist(s) | Arianna Lambie | Stanford | 9:04.81 | |
| 4 | Michelle Sikes | Wake Forest | 9:13.33 | |
| 5 | Brie Felnagle | North Carolina | 9:14.21 | |
| 6 | Amy Hastings | Arizona State | 9:19.31 | |
| 7 | Alex Becker | Tulsa | 9:19.69 | |
| 8 | Frances Koons | Villanova | 9:20.22 | |
| 9 | Erin Webster | Michigan | 9:20.50 | |
| 10 | Liz Wort | Duke | 9:21.77 | |

==== w5000 meters ====
| Rank | Name | University | Time | Notes |
|---|---|---|---|---|
| 1st place, gold medalist(s) | Sally Kipyego | Texas Tech | 15:27.42 | |
| 2nd place, silver medalist(s) | Arianna Lambie | Stanford | 15:37.97 | |
| 3rd place, bronze medalist(s) | Michelle Sikes | Wake Forest | 15:44.97 | |
| 4 | Amy Hastings | Arizona State | 15:52.10 | |
| 5 | Aine Hoban | Providence | 15:53.42 | |
| 6 | Julia Lucas | NC State | 15:58.85 | |
| 7 | Lindsey Anderson | Weber St. | 16:00.77 | |
| 8 | Salome Kosgei | Iona | 16:07.89 | |
| 9 | Madeline McKeever | Duke | 16:10.40 | |
| 10 | Sally Meyerhoff | Duke | 16:14.21 | |

==== w60 meters hurdles ====
| Rank | Name | University | Time | Notes |
|---|---|---|---|---|
| 1st place, gold medalist(s) | Shantia Moss | Georgia Tech | 7.98 | |
| 2nd place, silver medalist(s) | Jessica Ohanaja | LSU | 8.00 | |
| 3rd place, bronze medalist(s) | Ashley Lodree | Washington | 8.01 | |
| 4 | Candice Davis | USC | 8.05 | |
| 5 | Nickiesha Wilson Jamaica | LSU | 8.16 | |
| 6 | Nia Ali | Tennessee | 8.17 | |
| 7 | Celriece Law | Tennessee | 8.25 | |
| 8 | Monique Morgan | Villanova | 8.27 | |

==== wHigh jump ====
| Rank | Name | University | Height | Notes |
|---|---|---|---|---|
| 1st place, gold medalist(s) | Patricia Sylvester Grenada | Georgia | 1.89 m (6 ft 2 1/4 in) | |
| 2nd place, silver medalist(s) | Levern Spencer Saint Lucia | Georgia | 1.89 m (6 ft 2 1/4 in) | |
| 3rd place, bronze medalist(s) | Destinee Hooker | Texas | 1.86 m (6 ft 1 in) | |
| 4 | Sarah Wilfred | Cornell | 1.86 m (6 ft 1 in) | |
| 5 | Gaelle Niare | SMU | 1.83 m (6 ft 0 in) | |
| 6 | Caroline Wolf | Texas A&M | 1.83 m (6 ft 0 in) | |
| 7 | Inika McPherson | California | 1.83 m (6 ft 0 in) | |
| 8 | Kaylene Wagner | Kansas State | 1.83 m (6 ft 0 in) | |
| 9 | Epley Bullock | Nebraska | 1.83 m (6 ft 0 in) | |
| 10 | Natalie Sako | Akron | 1.80 m (5 ft 10 3/4 in) | |

==== wPole vault ====
| Rank | Name | University | Height | Notes |
|---|---|---|---|---|
| 1st place, gold medalist(s) | Elouise Rudy | Montana St. | 4.30 m (14 ft 1 1/4 in) | |
| 2nd place, silver medalist(s) | Natalie Moser | Florida | 4.30 m (14 ft 1 1/4 in) | |
| 3rd place, bronze medalist(s) | Kate Sultanova | Kansas | 4.30 m (14 ft 1 1/4 in) | |
| 4 | Ingrid Kantola | UCLA | 4.20 m (13 ft 9 1/4 in) | |
| 5 | Melinda Owen | Idaho | 4.20 m (13 ft 9 1/4 in) | |
| 6 | Stephanie Irwin | Arkansas | 4.10 m (13 ft 5 1/4 in) | |
| 7 | Mallory Peck | Purdue | 4.10 m (13 ft 5 1/4 in) | |
| 7 | Brysun Stately | Nebraska | 4.10 m (13 ft 5 1/4 in) | |
| 9 | Jodi Unger | Arkansas | 4.10 m (13 ft 5 1/4 in) | |
| 10 | Ashley Laughlin | Texas | 4.10 m (13 ft 5 1/4 in) | |

==== wLong jump ====
| Rank | Name | University | Distance | Notes |
|---|---|---|---|---|
| 1st place, gold medalist(s) | Rhonda Watkins Trinidad and Tobago | UCLA | 6.57 m (21 ft 6 1/2 in) | |
| 2nd place, silver medalist(s) | Brenda Faluade | Miami | 6.48 m (21 ft 3 in) | |
| 3rd place, bronze medalist(s) | Brittney Reese | Mississippi | 6.41 m (21 ft 1/4 in) | |
| 4 | Natasha Harvey | Jacksonville | 6.37 m (20 ft 10 3/4 in) | |
| 5 | Janay DeLoach | Colorado St. | 6.33 m (20 ft 9 in) | |
| 6 | Yvonne Mensah | Illinois | 6.25 m (20 ft 6 in) | |
| 7 | Mindy Neeley | BYU | 6.24 m (20 ft 5 1/2 in) | |
| 8 | Tanika Liburd Saint Kitts and Nevis | Southern Mississippi | 6.16 m (20 ft 2 1/2 in) | |
| 9 | Lauryn Jordan | Oregon | 6.13 m (20 ft 1 1/4 in) | |
| 10 | Yvette Lewis | Hampton | 6.12 m (20 ft 3/4 in) | |

==== wTriple jump ====
| Rank | Name | University | Distance | Notes |
|---|---|---|---|---|
| 1st place, gold medalist(s) | Erica McLain | Stanford | 13.9 m (45 ft 7 in) | |
| 2nd place, silver medalist(s) | Yvette Lewis | Hampton | 13.61 m (44 ft 7 3/4 in) | |
| 3rd place, bronze medalist(s) | Michelle Vaughn | Auburn | 13.21 m (43 ft 4 in) | |
| 4 | Toni Smith | Oklahoma | 13.09 m (42 ft 11 1/4 in) | |
| 5 | Nelly Tchayem France | UTEP | 13.08 m (42 ft 10 3/4 in) | |
| 6 | Cassandra Strickland | California | 13.07 m (42 ft 10 1/2 in) | |
| 7 | Alyce Williams | Florida State | 13.06 m (42 ft 10 in) | |
| 8 | Tomika Ferguson | Virginia | 12.98 m (42 ft 7 in) | |
| 9 | Andrea Linton | LSU | 12.96 m (42 ft 6 in) | |
| 10 | Agata Kosuda | Iowa St. | 12.95 m (42 ft 5 3/4 in) | |

==== wShot put ====
| Rank | Name | University | Distance | Notes |
|---|---|---|---|---|
| 1st place, gold medalist(s) | Sarah Stevens | Arizona State | 18.16 m (59 ft 6 3/4 in) | |
| 2nd place, silver medalist(s) | Michelle Carter | Texas | 18.12 m (59 ft 5 1/4 in) | |
| 3rd place, bronze medalist(s) | Jessica Pressley | Arizona State | 17.03 m (55 ft 10 1/4 in) | |
| 4 | Rachel Jansen | Northern Iowa | 16.97 m (55 ft 8 in) | |
| 5 | Abigail Ruston | Texas St. | 16.61 m (54 ft 5 3/4 in) | |
| 6 | Gail Lee | Memphis | 16.49 m (54 ft 1 in) | |
| 7 | Brittany Pryor | Virginia Tech | 16.35 m (53 ft 7 1/2 in) | |
| 8 | Mariam Kevkhishvili Georgia | Florida | 16.32 m (53 ft 6 1/2 in) | |
| 9 | Ashley Muffet | Kentucky | 16.20 m (53 ft 1 3/4 in) | |
| 10 | Kacey Onwuchekwa | Texas A&M | 15.97 m (52 ft 4 1/2 in) | |

==== wWeight throw ====
| Rank | Name | University | Distance | Notes |
|---|---|---|---|---|
| 1st place, gold medalist(s) | Brittany Riley | Southern Illinois | 25.56 m (83 ft 10 1/4 in) | |
| 2nd place, silver medalist(s) | Jenny Dahlgren Argentina | Georgia | 22.53 m (73 ft 11 in) | |
| 3rd place, bronze medalist(s) | Della Clark | Clemson | 20.85 m (68 ft 4 3/4 in) | |
| 4 | Elisha Hunt | Missouri | 20.79 m (68 ft 2 1/2 in) | |
| 5 | Sarah Stevens | Arizona State | 20.67 m (67 ft 9 3/4 in) | |
| 6 | Loren Groves | Kansas State | 20.59 m (67 ft 6 1/2 in) | |
| 7 | Veronica Jatsek | Ohio State | 20.36 m (66 ft 9 1/2 in) | |
| 8 | Britney Henry | Oregon | 20.29 m (66 ft 6 3/4 in) | |
| 9 | Elizabeth Alabi | Minnesota | 20.18 m (66 ft 2 1/4 in) | |
| 10 | Emily Turland | Louisville | 19.70 m (64 ft 7 1/2 in) | |

== See also ==
- NCAA Men's Division I Indoor Track and Field Championships
- NCAA Women's Division I Indoor Track and Field Championships
