= Sally Kipyego =

Kenyan-born American long- and middle-distance runner

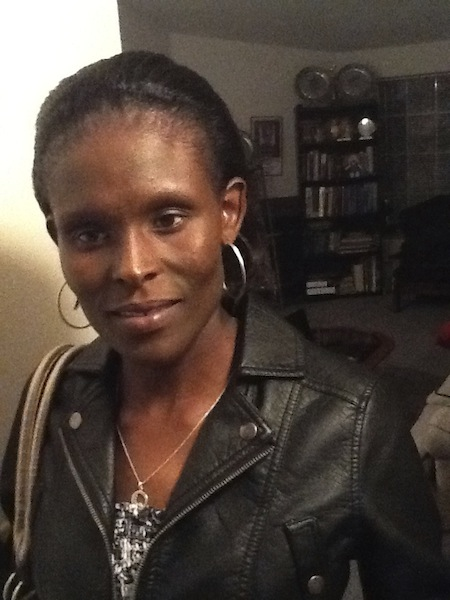

Personal information
- Nationality: Kenyan
- Born: 19 December 1985 (age 40) Kapsowar, Marakwet District, Kenya
- Education: Texas Tech

Sport
- Sport: Track and field
- Position: Runner
Medal record
Representing Kenya
Olympic Games
Silver medal – second place	2012 London	10,000 m
World Championships
Silver medal – second place	2011 Daegu	10,000 m
World Marathon Majors
Silver medal – second place	2016 New York City	Marathon

Sally Jepkosgei Kipyego (born 19 December 1985) is a Kenyan-born American long- and middle-distance runner. She was the silver medalist in the 10,000 metres at the 2011 World Championships in Athletics and the silver medalist in the same race at the 2012 Summer Olympics in London. She has a personal record of 30:38.35 minutes for that event and her 5000 metres best of 14:30.42 minutes makes her the second fastest Kenyan woman for the distance.

She competed as part of the Texas Tech Red Raiders cross country and track and field teams under coach Wes Kittley. She became the first Kenyan woman to win an NCAA cross country individual championship, the first woman to win three consecutive NCAA Division I Cross Country titles, and the first runner to win three consecutive Big 12 Conference cross country titles. She also won three straight NCAA Indoor titles over 5000 m and was a two-time NCAA Outdoor champion. She is tied with Suzy Favor-Hamilton for the most individual championships in NCAA history. Kipyego won more individual NCAA championships in 2 years than any other runner in NCAA history. Academically, Kipyego earned a nursing degree. She runs professionally on the International Association of Athletics Federations' ("IAAF") World Athletics Tour. She is sponsored by Nike, Inc.

== Early life ==
Born in Kapsowar, Marakwet District, Kipyego attended Kaptiony Primary School. The school was demolished and, in January 2013, the newly constructed Shoe4Africa Sally Kipyego School replaced it. Kipyego's running career started in 2000 when she was 14. The following year, she represented Kenya as a junior at the IAAF World Cross Country Championships, finishing eighth. However, a stress fracture kept her off both the 2002 and 2003 teams before entering college in the United States.

== Collegiate career ==
Sally Kipyego is the first Texas Tech Big 12 XC Champ & only female to ever win 3 Big 12 Conference cross country titles (06, 07, 08).

=== 2007 ===
After coming to the United States, Kipyego continued her running career as part of the South Plains College Texans track and cross country team for three semesters before joining the Texas Tech Red Raiders cross country and track and field teams, becoming the first Kenyan woman to win an NCAA cross country individual championship. In December 2006, she was chosen as the top female college cross-country athlete in the United States. This honour made her the recipient of the 2007 Honda Sports Award and gave her an automatic nomination for the Collegiate Woman Athlete of the Year award. Kipyego is also one of only seven women in NCAA history to win four individual track titles during a single season.

In November Kipyego won her second consecutive cross country national championship. In doing so, she set a new course record, beating the previous one by 18 seconds.

=== 2008 ===
As the nation's top collegiate female cross country runner, Kipyego was selected to receive the 2008 Honda Sports Award.

On 14 March 2008, Kipyego won her sixth national title at the 2008 NCAA Division I Indoor Track & Field Championships in the 5000 m, again with a world-leading time. The US Track & Field and Cross Country Coaches Association named Kipyego the USTFCCCA Division I Indoor Track & Field Women's Track Athlete of the Year for 2008. Later, the association also awarded Kipyego the Women's Athlete of the Year honour for the 2008 outdoor season as well.

On 5 May 2008, Kipyego set the NCAA 10,000-meter record in a time of 31:25.45 at the Stanford invitational (Palo Alto, CA), besting the previous record held by Lisa Koll by over 45 seconds. The record stood for almost two years, when it was taken back by Koll on the very same track in 2010.

On 13 June 2008, Kipyego won her seventh national title at the 2008 NCAA Division I Outdoor Track & Field Championships in the 5000 m, with an NCAA meet record time. She followed that performance with a second-place finish in the 1500 m on 14 June 2008. On 1 November 2008, Kipyego won the Big 12 Cross Country Championships with a time of 19:45, more than 50 seconds faster than second-place teammate Lillian Badaru. Her victory helped the Texas Tech women win their first conference championship. Kipyego became the first runner since the creation of the conference to win three consecutive conference titles.

=== 2009 ===
In 2009, Kipyego was awarded her third consecutive Honda Sports Award. She was the first athlete to be honoured three times with the program's cross-country award. Kipyego finished her college career at the 2009 Division I Indoor Track & Field Championships. She earned her ninth individual title by winning the 5000 meter. This tied her with Wisconsin's Suzy Favor-Hamilton for the most NCAA individual championships. It took Kipyego only two and a half years to accomplish what Favor-Hamilton did in four. In her final collegiate race, the mile, three-tenths of a second separated Kipyego from winner Sarah Bowman of the University of Tennessee.

== Professional career ==
=== 2010 ===
Kipyego began her professional career in the 2010 season. She signed up as a member of the Oregon Track Club. That year she came third in the Millrose Games mile and second at the Boston Indoor Games with a personal best of 14:52.67 minutes. She won her first outdoor 5000 m of the season at the Mt. SAC Relays and was in the top four of the event at the New York, Eugene and London legs of the 2010 IAAF Diamond League, before coming fifth in the final at the Memorial Van Damme with a new best of 14:38.64 minutes.

=== 2011 ===
At the start of 2011 she won the 3000 m at the Boston Indoor meet, then set an outdoor 1500 metres best of 4:06.23 minutes at the Oregon Relays in April. She bettered her 10,000 m time at the Payton Jordan Invitational by winning in 30:38.35. She gained selection for the Kenyan team in that event by coming second at the Kenyan trials. On the 2011 IAAF Diamond League she competed over 5000 m: she was fourth at the Prefontaine Classic, but managed second place at the DN Galan and Weltklasse Zürich meetings (improving her best to 14:30.42 minutes at the latter). She established herself internationally at the 2011 World Championships in Athletics, where she was the silver medallist in the 10,000 m, finishing second to her compatriot Vivian Cheruiyot. Kipyego ended her year by competing in American road competitions, taking second at the Fifth Avenue Mile and winning the Manchester Road Race for a second year running.

=== 2012 ===
In April 2012, Kipyego won the 5000 m at the Payton Jordan Invitational with a time of 14:43:11. A 3000 m best of 8:35.89 minutes came at the Prefontaine Classic, where she was second place. She guaranteed Olympic participation by coming third at the Kenyan 10,000 m trial event in Nairobi. She competed in both the 5000 m and the 10000 m, winning the silver medal in the 10000 m and narrowly missing out on a medal in the 5000 m, finishing less than a second behind bronze medalist Tirunesh Dibaba.

In September 2012, MRI and CT-Scans would reveal a broken Calcaneus bone in her left heel; But in April 2013, just as the looming track season became visible on the horizon, Kipyego's Calcaneus bone broke again.

=== 2014 ===
In March 2014, Sally Kipyego won and set the New York City half marathon women's record in 1:08:31. In May 2014, Kipyego won the women's 10,000m in 30:42.26 in the 2014 Payton Jordan Invitational. Kipyego's race is the fastest 10,000 meters in the world as of 10 July 2014. On 18 July, Kipyego ran 14:37.18 at the Diamond League Monaco.

=== 2015 ===
Sally Kipyego won the Millrose Games women's 3000m in 8:41.72, setting a meet record, and finishing 1.47 seconds ahead of compatriot Betsy Saina.

Competing in the 5,000 meters at the Payton Jordan Invitational on 2 May 2015, she ran a IAAF World Championships in Athletics world and Athletics at the 2016 Summer Olympics "A" standard qualifying time of 14:57.44 and was a winner just ahead of compatriot Betsy Saina.

Sally Kipyego placed 5th in 31:44.42 at 2015 World Championships in Athletics – Women's 10,000 metres.

On 1 November, Kipyego ran in her first marathon: the TCS New York City Marathon. The NYC Marathon weather forecast a high of 65 on race day, with a 50 percent chance of rain and 9 mph winds. Kipyego ran with the rest of the elites until mile 23, where she dropped out.

=== 2016 ===
Sally Kipyego ran 14:43.98 at 2016 Prefontaine Classic 5000 meters in Eugene, United States, on 27 May 2016. On 30 June 2016, Kipyego ran 32:37.11 for 10,000 meters at 2016 Athletics Kenya Olympic Trials in Eldoret at 2200 m (7,217 ft 10 in) elevation. Kipyego won a Rock 'n' Roll San Jose Half Marathon in 1:09:53 in San Jose, California. Runner-up Sally Kipyego (2:28:01) at 2016 New York City Marathon behind winner Mary Keitany (2:24:26) and ahead of Molly Huddle who placed third in 2:28:13.

=== 2020 ===
In Atlanta at the U.S. Woman's Olympic Trials Marathon on 29 February 2020, Sally Kipyego took third place in 2:28:52. She earned a spot on the US Olympic Team and won $55,000.

=== 2021 ===
Kipyego was considered a top contender going into the Olympic Marathon run in Sapporo, Japan, on 7 August 2021. She ran with the front runners alongside teammate Molly Seidel and the top Kenyans (Peres Jepchirchir and Brigid Kosgei) through the first half of the race. In the hot and humid conditions, Kipyego's pace was not strong enough to keep with the pack. She moved back and finished 17th in 2:32:53, five-and-a-half minutes back from winner Jepchirchir.

== Competition record ==
Year	Competition	Venue	Position	Event	Notes
2001	World Cross Country Championships	Ostend, Belgium	8th	Junior race	22:22
2011	World Championships	Daegu, South Korea	2nd	10,000 metres	30:50.04
2012	Olympic Games	London, United Kingdom	2nd	10,000 metres	30:26.37
2015	World Championships	Beijing, China	5th	10,000 metres	31:44.42
2021	Olympic Games	Sapporo, Japan	17th	Marathon	2:32:53

=== NCAA titles ===
- NCAA Women's Cross Country Championship: 2006, 2007, 2008
- NCAA Women's Outdoor Track and Field Championship: 10,000 m (2007), 5000 m (2008)
- NCAA Women's Indoor Track and Field Championship: 3000 m (2007), 5000 m (2007, 2008, 2009)
- NCAA Runner up: Outdoor 5000 m (2007), Outdoor 1500 m (2008), Indoor Mile (2009)

== Personal bests ==
- 1500 m – 4:06.23 – Eugene, United States (22 April 2011)
- Mile run (indoor) – 4:27.19 – College Station, United States (28 February 2009)
- 2000 m – 5:35.20 – Eugene, United States (7 June 2009)
- 3000 m – 8:34.18 – Brussels, Belgium (5 September 2014)
- Two miles (indoor) – 9:21.04 – Boston, United States (8 February 2014)
- 5000 m – 14:30.42 – Zurich, Switzerland, (8 September 2011)
- 10,000 m – 30:26.37 – London, United Kingdom (3 August 2012)
- 15k – 49:11 – Osaka, Japan (25 January 2015)
- 20k – 1:06:00 – Osaka, Japan (25 January 2015)
- Half marathon – 1:07:41 – New York City, United States (20 March 2016)
- Marathon – 2:28:01 – New York City, United States (6 November 2016; New York City Marathon)

== Personal life ==
Kipyego went to Moi Kapcherop Girls High School in Kapcherop, Marakwet District, with other girls who became professional runners, such as Pasca Myers. Her elder brothers, Mike Kipyego and Christopher Kipyego, are also runners.

When Kipyego was four years old, her father died, leaving her mother to raise seven children. The family was poor and her mother was often sick. When Kipyego was eleven, her brother's friend suffered an injury in a bicycle accident. Kipyego ran seven miles to the nearest clinic but the doctor was intoxicated and kicked her out. These events gave Kipyego the desire to become a nurse so she could help provide better healthcare in her native country.

Kipyego first enrolled at South Plains College in Levelland, Texas. After transferring to Texas Tech, she applied to the nursing program in February 2007. Kipyego received an acceptance letter and began her first nursing class on 5 July 2007. Kipyego earned her nursing degree May 2009. Texas Tech cross country All-American Kevin Chelimo, now a volunteer assistant coach for Texas Tech Red Raiders, married Sally Kipyego in 2008 summer.

In January 2017, Kipyego became a U.S. citizen.
