= AJet (disambiguation) =

Ajet, AJet, AJET, ajet may refer to:

- Helios Airways, later renamed to "AJet" (αjet), a Cypriot airline
- Australasian Journal of Educational Technology
- Africa Journal of Evangelical Theology
- "Association of Japan Exchange and Teaching" (AJET), support association for the JET Programme
- AJet, low cost subsidiary of Turkish Airlines

== See also ==
- 11 Squadron (Belgium), "AJeTS", the Belgian Advanced Jet Training School
