= Korkitony =

Village in Elgeyo-Marakwet, Kenya

- Village
- Location within Kenya
- Coordinates: 00°50′28″N 35°29′54″E
- Country: Kenya
- County: Elgeyo-Marakwet
- Sub-county: Keiyo North
- Location: Kapchemutwa

Korkitony is a village near Chebiemit village, Elgeyo-Marakwet County, Kenya. It is part of Kapchemutwa location of Kamariny Division of Keiyo District. Its local authority is Keiyo County Council and constituency is Keiyo North.

It is the birthplace of professional runner Brimin Kipruto.
