= Kalamba =

Kalamba Kalamba Nzaui Maiani
- Urban Area
- Location in Kenya
- Coordinates: 1°52′S 37°31′E
- Country: Kenya
- County: Makueni County
- Founded: 1895
- Time zone: UTC+3 (EAT)
- Postcode: 90122
- Climate: Cwb

Kalamba is town found in Makueni Constituency Makueni County in Kenya. The town was started as a mission station of Africa Inland Mission in 1895 by Peter Cameron Scott. In Kalamba, there is final resting place for Peter Scott.

== First AIC Church at Kalamba village ==
As a historical destination, it is now known as the origin of AIC Church in Kenya. In 1895, Mr. Peter Cameron Scott, a Scottish missionary sent from America passed here and ventured further interior to Nzaui where he set up the first Africa inland Mission in Kalamba with his sister Margret and six others. After hardly seven months, he had established three other missions in Ukambani at Sakai, Kilungu and Kangundo. He died in Nzaui- Kalamba on 4 December in 1896, after having established the first mission that gave birth to the Africa Inland Church in Ukambani.

== The AIC Kalamba Mission ==
A very committed Christian, Peter Scott managed to build the first house that measured 30 ft by 14 ft that was completed on 23 December 1895 which the five missionaries occupied. Peter was generally weak but very strong in faith as he had been run over by a hand cart back home at the age of 3 making his general condition of health unpredictable for the better part of his life. Despite his poor health he had within 7 months managed to establish three other mission stations at Sakai, Kilungu and Kangundo including the main station at Kalamba through very challenging situations.

A portrait of Johannes Hoffman and that of his wife Emilie who lived here between (1886–1914) is preserved in the church with a written message in his own words.

== Rock climbing ==
Kalamba has a reputation as a "rock climbers paradise."
