= Marakwet District =

Defunct administrative district in the former Rift Valley Province of Kenya

Coordinates: 0°56′54″N 35°30′31″E

Marakwet District is a defunct administrative district in the former Rift Valley Province of Kenya. Its capital town was Kapsowar. The district had a population of 140, 629 people in the 1999 Census. Local people are predominantly of the Marakwet tribe.

The district was created in 1994 when Elgeyo-Marakwet District was split into Marakwet and Keiyo Districts in 1994. In 2010, the two districts were joined again to form Elgeyo-Marakwet County.

Many famous Kenyan runners come from Marakwet, most notably Moses Kiptanui, Evans Rutto, Reuben Kosgei, Ezekiel Kemboi and Richard Chelimo.

The district has only one local authority, Marakwet County Council. Its population is thus the same as that of the district (140,629). The council and district have no population classified as urban (1999 census).

The Marakwet district headquarters was located at the hilly town of Kapsowar. Other rural centres/towns are Chebiemit, Kapcherop, Cheptongei, Arroor, Chesongoch, Chesoi, Kipsaiya, Sisiya, Kapyego, Tot, Sangach, Kapchebau, Kakimiti, Meuno, Kamogo, Tirap, and Embobut Mosop.

== Administrative divisions ==
| Division | Population* | Headquarters |
|---|---|---|
| Chebiemit | 18,559 | Chebiemit |
| Kapcherop | 39,328 | Kapcherop |
| Kapsowar | 19,647 | Kapsowar |
| Kapyego | 11,452 | Kapyego |
| Tirap | 23,311 | Kapchebau |
| Tot | 17,744 | Tot |
| Tunyo | 10,588 | |
* 1999 census. Source:

== Constituencies ==
The district had two constituencies:

- Marakwet East Constituency
- Marakwet West Constituency
