= Scott Christian University =

University in Kenya

- Former name: Scott Theological College
- Established: 1962
- Vice-Chancellor: Dr. Jonathan Mwania
- Students: 2000 (Approx.)
- Location: Machakos, Kenya; 1°30′S 37°16′E
- Website: www.scott.ac.ke

Scott Christian University (SCU) is a private Christian university in Machakos, Kenya.

== History ==
Scott is the National Theological College of the Africa Inland Church (AIC) in Kenya inaugurated in 1962 Its purpose was and still is to provide training for Church ministries at a more advanced academic level than was available through most of the Bible schools here in Kenya Though affiliated to AIC, it has existed to serve all the evangelical Churches in East and Central Africa and even beyond Until 1982 it was offering Diplomas in Theology However, in 1986, Scott began offering Bachelor of Theology Degree (B Th.) In 1979 Scott was chartered by the Accrediting Council of Theological Education in Africa (ACTEA) and later in 1997, it was chartered by the Government of Kenya now operating under the Commission for Higher Education (CHE). In 2006 the university was re-inspected and granted a certificate as an affirmation of quality assurance This dual accreditation has ensured high quality education which is recognized world wide.It was established by the Africa Inland Mission in 1962 as Scott Theological College (STC), and named after AIM's founder, Peter Cameron Scott.

Scott received its university charter in 1997, adopting its present name in 2012.

== Academics ==
Scott christian university Academic Division is composed of Two schools:

- School of Theology and Social Sciences (STSS)
- School of Education And Business Studies(SEBS)

Scott publishes an academic journal, the Africa Journal of Evangelical Theology. (AJET)

== See also ==
- Africa Journal of Evangelical Theology (AJET)
