= Frances Koons =

American middle-distance runner

Frances Markowitz (Formerly Frances Koons) (born April 2, 1986, Bethlehem, Pennsylvania) is an American middle-distance runner who attended Villanova University and now runs professionally for New Balance. Koons finished 2nd to Sally Kipyego at the 2009 NCAA Indoor Track 5000m race, and 3rd to Angela Bizzarri and Nicole Blood at the 2009 NCAA Outdoor Track 5000m race. Koons ran the 1200m opening leg for the Villanova team that won the 2004 Penn Relays Championship of America distance medley relay. She earned 10 NCAA All-American honors in Cross Country and Track & Field while at Villanova. Koons also earned 5 individual and 2 team Big East titles during her career. Koons graduated from Villanova University in 2009 with a Bachelor of Science degree in Mathematics. In April 2010 at the Penn Relays Koons won the women's Olympic Development event at 5,000 meters and qualified for U.S. Outdoor Track and Field Championships.

In 2007, Koons discovered that she had kidney cancer.
