= Chesoi =

- Location within Kenya
- Coordinates: 1.07°N 35.6°E
- Country: Kenya
- Province: Rift Valley Province

Population (2019)
  - Total: 2,489
- Time zone: UTC+3 (EAT)
- Chesoi center is in between kapsowar and Chesongoch centers..it was recently made the headquarters of the New Marakwet East District.

Chesoi is a small town in Elgeyo Marakwet County in the former Rift Valley Province of Kenya. The town hosts the region's historical monuments such as Chorwó Kimikeu, Chesoi Primary School, Chesoi Health Centre, and Chesoi Catholic Parish.

Chesoi town started in 1950s as a convenience trading centre, owing to its proximity to other regions such as Kapsowar, Chugor, Chesongoch, Tuturung, and Kapyego.

== Early history ==
Chesoi, and its economy, developed from small scale business activities in that area such as the selling of fruits, especially mangoes, from the lower side of Sambirir.

== Recent developments ==
Prior to the enactment and promulgation of the 2010 constitution, Chesoi was a small dust-ghost town with minimal developments. Currently there is adverse development changes ranging from technology and infrastructure. Major development changes that are established in Chesoi include the construction of Chesoi Sub-County Hospital which it would contain a maternity centre which contains approximately 50 beds. Chesoi also has various office such as that of the Assistant county commissioner, KNUT offices, Kenya Forest services, Child Human Rights offices.
