= Brimin Kipruto =

Kenyan middle-distance runner

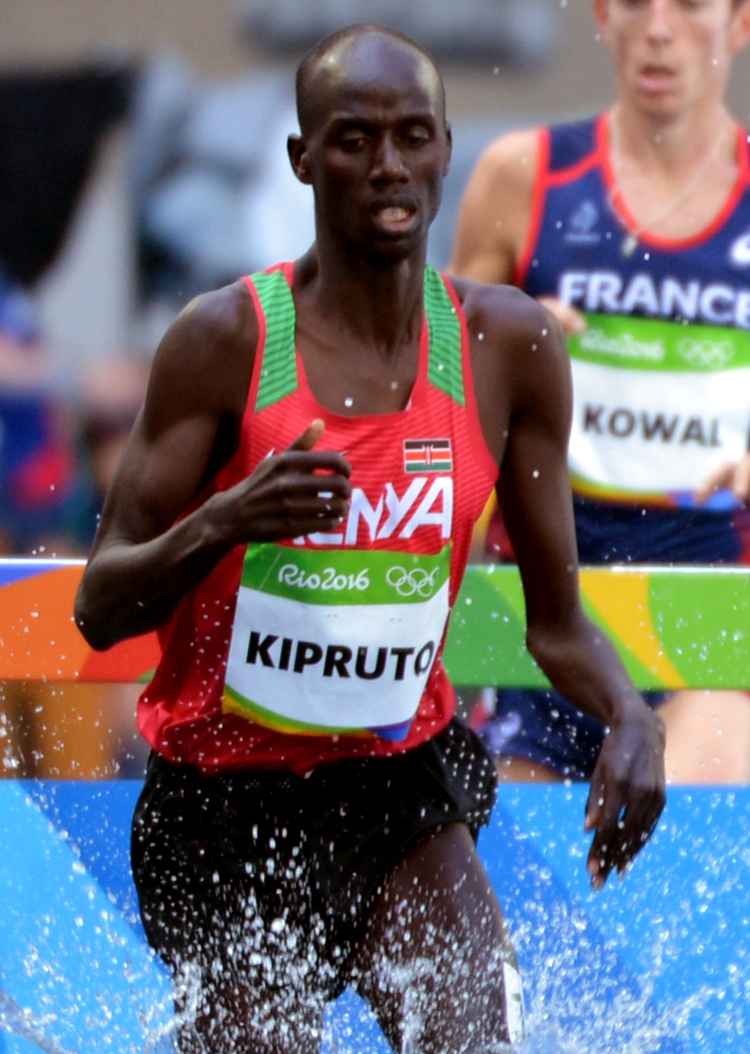
- Kipruto at the Rio 2016 Olympics

Personal information
- Full name: Brimin Kiprop Kipruto
- Born: 31 July 1985 (age 41) Korkitony, Kenya
- Height: 175 cm (5 ft 9 in)
- Weight: 55 kg (121 lb)
Medal record
Men's athletics
Representing Kenya
Olympic Games
Gold medal – first place	2008 Beijing	3000 m st.
Silver medal – second place	2004 Athens	3000 m st.
World Championships
Gold medal – first place	2007 Osaka	3000 m st.
Silver medal – second place	2011 Daegu	3000 m st.
Bronze medal – third place	2005 Helsinki	3000 m st.
Bronze medal – third place	2015 Beijing	3000 m st.
Commonwealth Games
Bronze medal – third place	2010 Delhi	3000 m st.

Brimin Kiprop Kipruto (born 31 July 1985) is a Kenyan professional middle-distance runner who specialises in the 3000 metres steeplechase. He was born in Korkitony, Keiyo District. He holds a personal best of 7:53.64 minutes which is the second fastest time ever run, and the African Record. His personal best is only 0.01 of a second behind the world record of former country mate Saif Saaeed Shaheen, who switched national affiliation to Qatar after growing up as Stephen Cherono in the Keiyo District.

He won a silver medal at the 2004 Summer Olympics at the age of nineteen and improved to win the gold medal at the 2008 Beijing Olympics four years later. A World Championships bronze medallist in 2005, he took his first global title in the steeplechase with a win at the 2007 World Championships in Athletics.

== Career ==
At the 2001 World Youth Championships in Athletics in Debrecen, Hungary he finished second in steeplechase. He graduated from Kipsoen Secondary School in 2003. The same year he competed at the African Junior Championships in Cameroon and took silver again. At the 2004 World Junior Championships in Athletics he competed in the 1500m instead of steeplechase and finished third.

In 2004, having finished 2nd at the Kenyan Olympic trials, the young Kipruto won the silver medal in the 3000 m steeplechase at the 2004 Olympic Games. In the 2005 World Championships in Helsinki he won a bronze medal in the same event. He finished third again at the 2005 IAAF World Athletics Final. In 2006 he finished sixth at the World Athletics Final, repeating his place from 2004.

In 2007, he won the gold medal in the steeplechase at the World Championships, in Osaka. After qualifying to the 2008 Beijing Olympics, Kipruto finally won the gold medal at the same event. At the 2009 World Championships, the defending champion finished seventh.

He took two wins on the 2010 IAAF Diamond League circuit, finishing in first place at the Athletissima and Meeting Areva, but it was Kenyan rival Paul Kipsiele Koech who went on to win the inaugural Diamond League trophy in the steeplechase. He entered the 2010 Commonwealth Games with the fastest mark of the year (8:00.90), but could only manage third place behind Richard Mateelong and Ezekiel Kemboi as part of a Kenyan medal sweep.

He competed in the short race at the Great Edinburgh Cross Country and finished in third place behind Eliud Kipchoge and Asbel Kiprop.

He lives in Korkitony and trains with the Global Sports group in Kaptagat near Eldoret under coaches Patrick Sang and Joseph Chelimo.

== Personal best ==
- 1500 Metres – 3:35.23 (2006)
- 3000 Metres – 7:47.33 (2006)
- 2000 Metres Steeplechase – 5:36.81 (2001)
- 3000 Metres Steeplechase – 7:53.64 (2011)

== Achievements ==
Year	Competition	Venue	Position	Event	Notes
Representing Kenya
2001	World Youth Championships	Debrecen, Hungary	2nd	2000 m steeple	5:36.81
2003	African Junior Championships	Garoua, Cameroon	2nd	3000 m s'chase	8:46.74
2004	World Junior Championships	Grosseto, Italy	3rd	1500m	3:35.96
2004	Olympic Games	Athens, Greece	2nd	3000 m s'chase	8:06.11
2004	World Athletics Final	Monte Carlo, Monaco	6th	3000 m s'chase	8:16.45
2005	World Cross Country Championships	St Etienne, France	37th	Short race (4.196 km)	12:26
2005	World Championships	Helsinki, Finland	3rd	3000 m s'chase	8:15.30
2005	World Athletics Final	Monte Carlo, Monaco	3rd	3000 m s'chase	8:09.20
2006	World Cross Country Championships	Fukuoka, Japan	18th	Short race (4 km)	11:17
2006	World Athletics Final	Stuttgart, Germany	6th	3000 m s'chase	8:20.05
2007	World Championships	Osaka, Japan	1st	3000 m s'chase	8:13.82
2007	World Athletics Final	Stuttgart, Germany	3rd	3000 m s'chase	8:11.05
2008	Olympic Games	Beijing, China	1st	3000 m s'chase	8:10.34
2008	World Athletics Final	Stuttgart, Germany	9th	3000 m s'chase	8:29.11
2009	World Championships	Berlin, Germany	7th	3000 m s'chase	8:12.61
2009	World Athletics Final	Thessaloniki, Greece	6th	3000 m s'chase	8:16.44
2012	Olympic Games	London, Great Britain	5th	3000 m s'chase	8:23.03
2015	World Championships	Beijing, China	3rd	3000 m s'chase	8:12.54
2016	Olympic Games	Rio de Janeiro, Brazil	6th	3000 m s'chase	8:18.79
2017	World Championships	London, United Kingdom	23rd (h)	3000 m s'chase	8:33.33
