= Peter Cameron Scott =

Scottish-American missionary

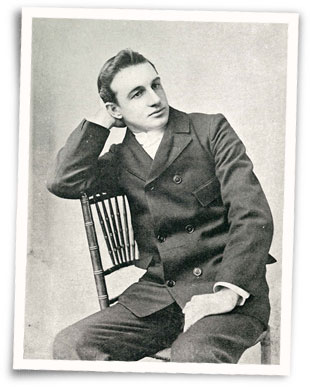
Peter Cameron Scott

Peter Cameron Scott (1867–1896) was a Scottish-American missionary and founder of Africa Inland Mission.

== Biography ==
Scott was born to a Christian family in Glasgow, which later migrated to the United States and settled in Philadelphia. However, at the age of twenty, due to poor health his doctor advised him to change climates and returned to Scotland to recover. It was in Glasgow that he visited the grave of his sister, considered his own death, and dedicated his life to Christian work.

He served two years in the French Congo before returning to Britain in 1892 because of a near-fatal illness. While recuperating, he developed his idea of establishing a network of mission stations that would stretch from the southeast coast of Africa to Lake Chad. While he was unable to interest any churches in the idea (including his own), he captivated several friends in Philadelphia. In 1895 they formed the Philadelphia Missionary Council.

On August 17, 1895, AIM's first mission party set off, consisting of Scott, his sister Margaret, and six others. They arrived off the east African coast in October, and in little more than a year his idea was to establish a network had four stations—at Kalamba, Sakai, Kilungu, and Kangundo, all in Kenya. More workers came from Canada and the United States, and the small group expanded to 15.

In December 1896, Peter Scott died of blackwater fever. The mission almost dissolved in the next year when most of the workers either died or resigned, but Peter Cameron Scott's vision of the network of mission stations extending to the centre of Africa has ultimately been fulfilled with churches established throughout East Africa, and in most other countries of the continent.

He was buried at Nairobi South cemetery.

== Honors ==
Scott Christian University is named in his honor.

== See also ==
- Africa Inland Mission
- Christianity in Africa
