= Chebiemit =

- Location within Kenya
- Coordinates: 0.85°N 35.5°E
- Country: Kenya
- Province: Rift Valley Province

Population (2019)
  - Total: 27,180
  - Density: 197/km^{2} (510/sq mi)
- Time zone: UTC+3 (EAT)

Chebiemit is a settlement in Kenya's Marakwet District. It was part of the former Rift Valley Province.
