= Christine Kalmer =

South African long-distance runner

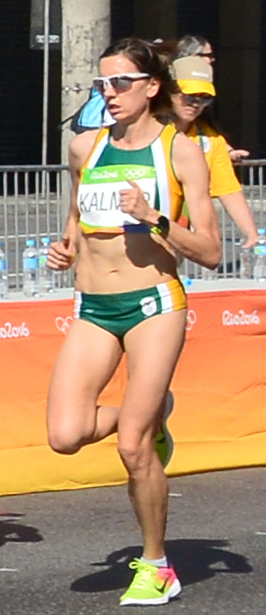
- Christine Kalmer at the 2016 Summer Olympics

Personal information
- Born: 10 February 1986 (age 40) Roodepoort, South Africa
- Height: 172 cm (5 ft 8 in)
- Weight: 55 kg (121 lb)

Sport
- Country: South Africa
- Sport: Track and field
- Event: Marathon

Christine Kalmer (born 10 February 1986) is a South African long-distance runner who specialises in the marathon. She competed in the women's marathon event at the 2016 Summer Olympics. She finished in 96th place with a time of 2:48:24.
