= Linda Hadjar =

French athletics competitor (born 1982)

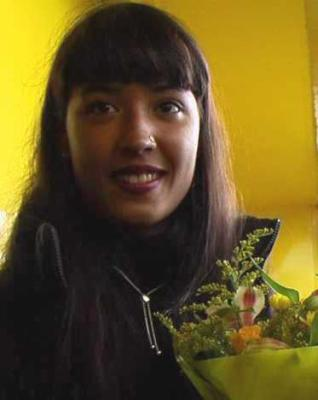

Personal information
- Nationality: France United States
- Born: 4 March 1982 (age 44) Rodez, Aveyron, France
- Height: 1.60 m (5 ft 3 in)
- Weight: 45 kg (99 lb)

Sport
- Sport: Athletics
- Events: Long distance running/3000,5000 meters, Cross-Country
- Club: ASPTT lille/ neuilly Plaisance Sport
- Coached by: Richard Huart

Linda Hadjar birth name "Lynda Hadjar" (born 4 March 1982) is a former French middle and long distance runner, who specialized in 3000/5000 meters and cross-country.

She finished 6th at 5000 meters at the 2003 European Athletics U23 Championships in Bydgoszcz, Poland. Before that Hadjar also won 3 French national championships in cross-country. Hadjar left a big impression winning her first national title with a 30-second lead. She took 39th place at the Cross-Country world championship at her first major international competition in Vilamoura.

Hadjar realized the 3rd best French performance of all time U23 on the 3000 meters.

== Track and field outdoor championships ==
- 1st place at the French championship 800m Dreux FRA (CA)
- 1st place at the French championship 3000 m (JU)
- 6th place at the 2003 European Athletics U23 Championships 5000 m Bydgoszcz POL
- 11th place at the French outdoor Championship 5000 m Narbonne FRA

== Cross-Country championships ==
- 1st at the French Cross-Country Championships (JU) Carhaix-Plouguer FRA
- 1st at the French Cross-Country Championships (JU) Grande Synthe FRA
- 1st at the French Cross-Country Championships (ES) Saint-Quentin-en-Yvelines FRA
- 39th at the IAAF World Junior Cross-Country Championships
- 40th at the SPAR European Junior Cross-Country Championships Thun SUI
- 54th at the IAAF World Junior Cross-Country Championships Ostend BEL
- 22 selections for French teams.
