= Africa Journal of Evangelical Theology =

- Language: English
- Edited by: Andrew G. Wildsmith

Publication details
- Former name(s): East Africa Journal of Evangelical Theology
- History: 1982-present
- Publisher: Scott Christian University (Kenya)
- Frequency: Biannually

Standard abbreviations
- ISO 4: Afr. J. Evang. Theol.

Indexing
- ISSN: 1026-2946
- OCLC no.: 22748210

The Africa Journal of Evangelical Theology is an academic journal published by Scott Christian University in Kenya. It serves as the principal forum for evangelical reflection on African theology.

AJET was first published in 1982 as the East Africa Journal of Evangelical Theology. It adopted its present name in 1990.
