= Kapcherop =

Town in Elgeyo-Marakwet County, Kenya

Coordinates: 1°02′N 35°19′E

Kapcherop is a town and administrative division of Elgeyo-Marakwet County, Kenya. Prior to March 2013, it was located in the Marakwet District, Rift Valley Province.

The administrative division had a population of 39,328 in 1999.

The town is the birthplace of Kenyan runner Ismael Kirui., The late olympian Richard Chelimo, marathoner Sally Kurui, great retired steeplchaser Moses Kiptanui.

Kapcherop Township is the main commercial hub of Elgeyo Marakwet County besides Iten Town.

In addition, several education institutions are situated within the town and they are 1. Kapcherop Vocational Training Institute. 2. Kapcherop Polytechnic. 3. Moi Kapcherop Girls Secondary School. 4. Kapcherop Boys Secondary School. 5. Kapcherop Comprehensive Primary School. 6. St. Patrick's Catholic Church primary school. 7. Mizpah Academy.

Kapcherop Township too houses many churches vis a vis Catholic Church, Africa Inland, Adventist Church, World Gospel Mission and many others.
