= Africa Inland Mission =

Christian mission-sending agency focused on Africa

Africa Inland Mission (AIM)
- Founded: 1895
- Founder: Peter Cameron Scott
- Type: Evangelical missions agency
- Region served: 13+ African nations
- Website: AIM International site, AIM USA Site, AIM Canada Site, AIM Europe Site

Established in 1895, Africa Inland Mission (AIM) is a Christian mission sending agency focused on Africa. Their stated mission is to see "Christ-centered churches established among all African peoples." AIM established the Kapsowar Hospital in 1933. It developed into the Africa Inland Church (AIC), based in Kenya.

== History of AIM ==
AIM's first missionaries set sail on August 17, 1895

Africa Inland Mission had its beginning in the work of Peter Cameron Scott (1867–1896), a Scottish-American missionary who served two years in the Congo before being forced to seek medical care in Britain in 1892 because of a near-fatal illness. While recuperating, he developed his idea of establishing a network of mission stations which would stretch from the southeast coast of Africa to the interior's Lake Chad. He was unable to interest any churches in the idea (including his own), but managed to captivate several friends in Philadelphia. In 1895 they formed the Philadelphia Missionary Council.

=== Beginnings ===
More important than specialized training, AIM found acceptance among tribal people based on Christian commitment and moral standing. The council was headed by Rev. Charles Hurlburt, president of the Pennsylvania Bible Institute, the organisation which provided most of the mission's workers in its very early years.

=== First mission party ===
On August 17, 1895, AIM's first mission party set off. The group consisted of Scott, his sister Margaret, and six others. They arrived off the east African coast in October, and in little over a year they established a network of mission stations which would eventually stretch from the southeast coast of the continent to the interior's Lake Chad.

The mission had four stations — at Nzaui, Sakai (Kenya), Kilungu, and Kangundo, Manyatta, all in Kenya. Additional workers arrived from Canada and the United States and the small group expanded to fifteen.

=== Scott's death ===
In December 1896, Peter Scott died of blackwater fever. The mission almost disbanded the following year when most of the workers either died or resigned. The council began to take more responsibility for the work and appointed Hurlburt director of the mission. He and his family moved to Africa and for the next two decades he provided strong, if not undisputed, leadership for the headquarters, established in 1903 at Kijabe, Kenya.

=== Ministry expansion ===
Theodore Roosevelt and Charles Hurlburt

After Kijabe, AIM expanded to Mataara (1908), Kinyona (1911), and a dispensary (today a hospital) in Kapsowar (1933). Of the Kikuyu who showed interest in the mission and its activities, many were from what would be considered the bottom rungs of society, lacking property and power, including ahoi (landless tenants) and people who were neither mbari nor riika leaders and unlikely to be so in future. The AIM provided such people with an alternative route to power and status, just as others were being closed off, offered a refuge for some from the egregious aspects of domination by colonial chiefs and their colonial masters, and also furnished an opportunity for what some regarded as a more satisfying spiritual life within the Christian faith.

From Kenya, the mission expanded its work to neighboring countries. In 1909, a station was set up in what was then German East Africa and later became Tanzania. In 1912, Theodore Roosevelt pulled some strings, persuading the Belgian government to permit a mission station in colonial Congo. Work began in Uganda in 1918; in French Equatorial Africa (Central African Republic) in 1924; Sudan in 1949; and the islands of the Indian Ocean in 1975. Besides evangelism, workers of the mission ran clinics, hospitals, schools, publishing operations, and radio programs. The Rift Valley Academy was built at Kijabe for missionary children. Scott Theological College in Kenya helped train African church leaders. The churches founded by the mission in each of its fields were eventually organised into branches of the independent Africa Inland Church which continues to work closely with the mission today.

=== AIM's goals ===
Africa Inland Mission's stated mission is see "Christ centered Churches established among all African peoples." Their goal is to introduce Jesus Christ to those who have never heard of him. AIM seeks to help new believers grow strong and healthy in their faith and to see new believers enfolded into a maturing church. The organization aims to invest in the lives of current and future church leaders so they can effectively affect the lives of others who can in turn reach out to the vast population of Africa and beyond. The Mission Handbook gives AIM's goal "to plant maturing churches...through the evangelization of unreached people groups and the effective preparation of church leaders."

== See also ==
- Rift Valley Academy
- China Inland Mission
