= Alba García =

Spanish actress

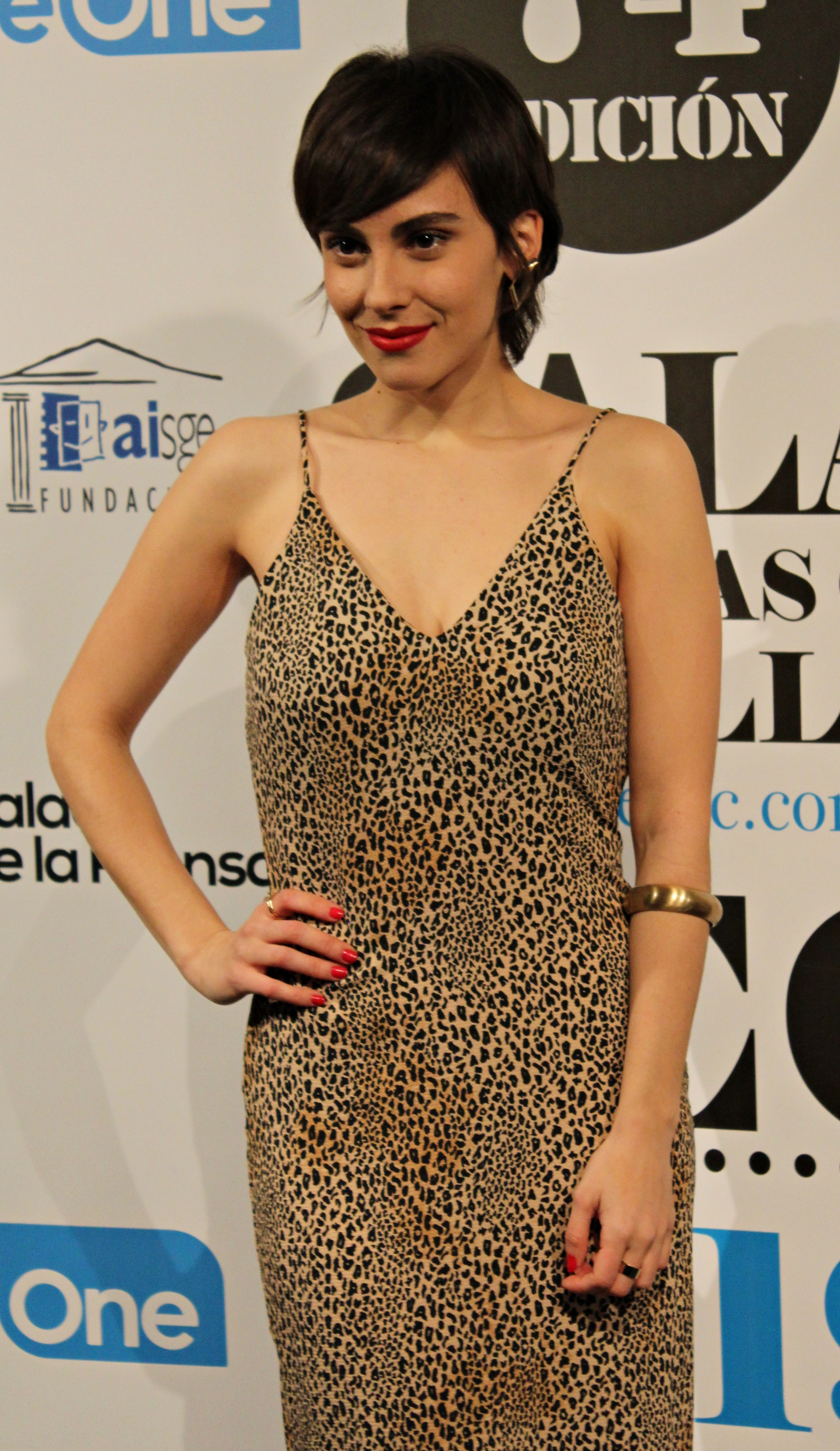
- Born: 12 July 1992 (age 32); Móstoles, Spain
- Occupation: Actress
- Years active: 2010–present

Alba García (born 12 July 1992) is a Spanish actress, best known for her role in 2011 fantasy film Verbo.

== Filmography ==
=== Film ===
Year	Title	Original title	Role	Notes
2011	Verbo	Verbo	Sara	Nominated - Goya Award for Best New Actress
2012	Summertime	Summertime	Presenter	
2013	Faraday	Faraday	Sonia	
2014	A Brief Love Story	Una breve historia de amor	Inés	
2017	Call TV	Call TV		

=== Television ===
Year	Title	Original title	Role	Notes
2010	I'm Not Like You	No soy como tú	Bea	Mini-series
2013	Isabel	Isabel	Morayma	5 episodes
2017	11D. One Winter Morning.	11D. Una mañana de invierno.	Raquel	TV movie
2020	Si vienes, repites	Si vienes, repites		Episode: "La Abducción Argumentada"
