= Beatrice Lanza =

Italian triathlete (born 1982)

Beatrice Lanza (born 22 March 1982) is a triathlete. She was born in Biella, Italy. Lanza competed at the second Olympic triathlon at the 2004 Summer Olympics. She took fifteenth place with a total time of 2:07:59.26.
