= Widad Mendil =

Algerian steeplechase runner

Personal information
- Nationality: Algeria
- Born: 12 May 1983 (age 43)

Sport
- Sport: Athletics
- Event: Steeplechase
- Club: MC Alger

Achievements and titles
- Personal best: 3000 m steeplechase: 9:47.88 (2008)

Widad Mendil (Arabic: وداد منديل; born May 12, 1983) is an Algerian steeplechase runner. Mendil represented Algeria at the 2008 Summer Olympics in Beijing, where she competed for the first ever women's 3000 metres steeplechase. She ran in the first heat against sixteen other athletes, including Russia's Gulnara Galkina-Samitova, who eventually became an Olympic champion in the final. She finished the race in last place by three seconds behind Japan's Minori Hayakari, with a time of 9:52.35. Mendil, however, failed to advance into the final, as she placed thirty-seventh overall, and was ranked below four mandatory slots for the next round.
