= Kevin Chelimo =

Kenyan runner

Personal information
- Nationality: Kenyan
- Born: 14 February 1983 (age 43) Kabarnet, Kenya

Sport
- Sport: Track and field
- Position: Runner
- College team: Texas Tech

Kevin Chelimo (born 14 February 1983) is a Kenyan long- and middle-distance runner.

== Prep and College ==
Chelimo graduated from Tenges high school. Chelimo graduated from Tambach Teachers Training College and Texas Tech in 2006. Kevin finished 17th 2006 NCAA Division I cross country running championships, and 10th in 2007 NCAA Division I 10,000 metres. Chelimo competed in national 3000 metres.

== Coach ==
Texas Tech cross country All-American Kevin Chelimo, a volunteer assistant coach for Texas Tech Red Raiders from 2006 - 2008.

== Personal ==
Kevin Chelimo married Sally Kipyego in 2008 summer.

== Professional ==
=== Since 2008 ===
Training in Eugene, Oregon with Oregon Track Club.

==== 2012 ====
Chelimo ran 2012 Payton Jordan Invitational in 13:14.57.

Chelimo competed in the 10,000 meters at the 2012 Kenyan Olympic Trials.

==== 2015 ====
Kevin's long buildup to NYC Marathon included:

- Half Marathon 1:02:11 New York (USA) 15 March 2015
- New York Road Runners 10 km in May 2015 29:19 6th place

Kevin Chelimo debuted at 1 November 2015 NYC Marathon in 2:15:49 in 10th place.

=== Personal Best ===
Marathon: 2:15:49
Half-Marathon: 1:01:21
10000 m: 27:30.50
5000 m: 13:14.57
