= Lesley Shannon =

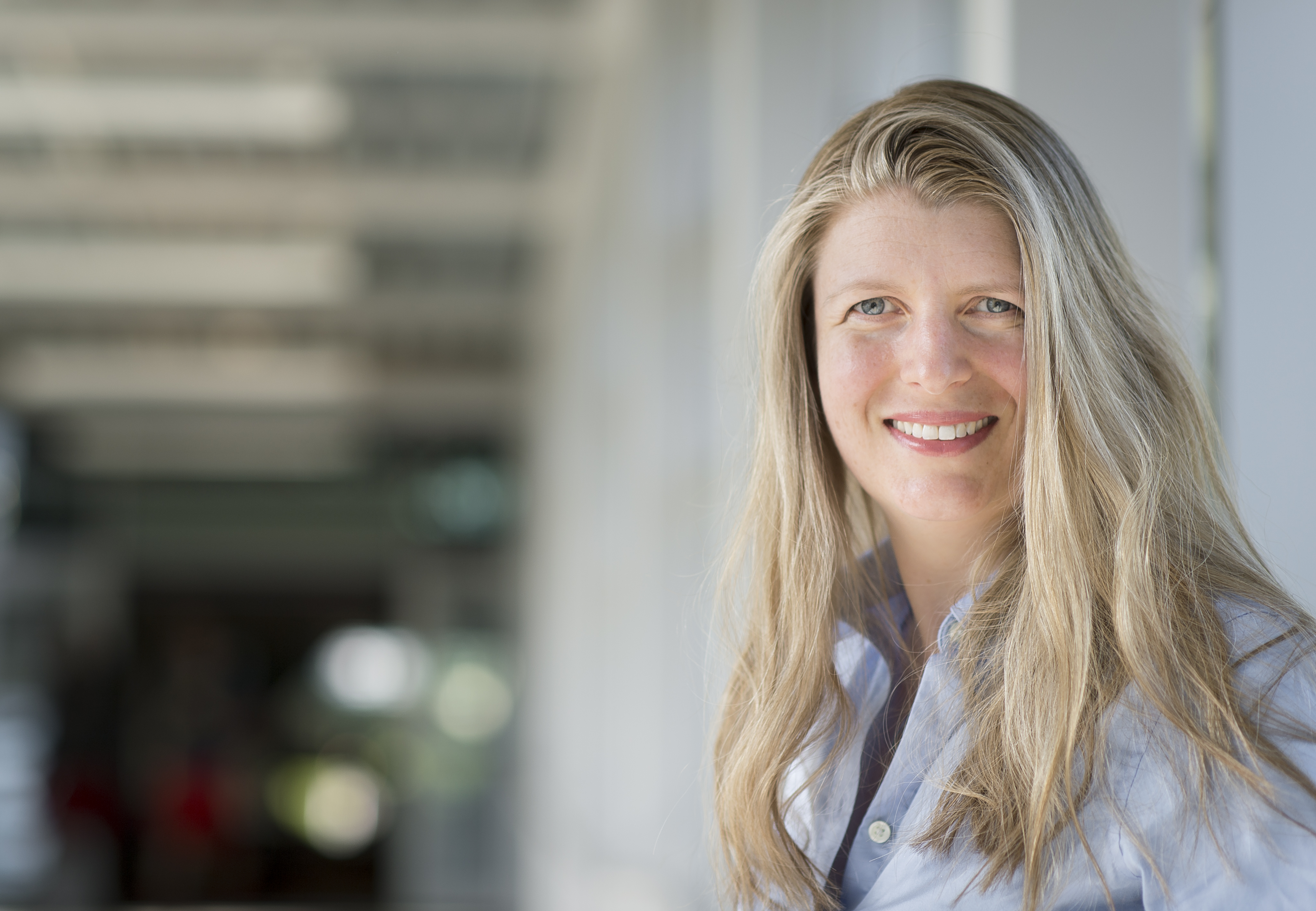
- Occupation: Professor

Academic background
- Education: University of New Brunswick (BS) University of Toronto (MASc, PhD)

Lesley Shannon is a Canadian professor who is chair for the Computer Engineering Option in the School of Engineering Science at Simon Fraser University. She is also the current NSERC Chair for Women in Science and Engineering for BC and Yukon. Shannon's chair operates the Westcoast Women in Engineering, Science and Technology (WWEST) program to promote equity, diversity and inclusion in STEM.

== Education ==
Shannon received her B.Sc., Electrical Engineering with the Computer Option from the University of New Brunswick in 1999 (Canada). She then completed her Masters of Applied Sciences and Ph.D. at the University of Toronto (Canada) in 2001 and 2006, respectively.

== Career ==
Shannon's primary area of interest is Computing System Design, including architectures, design methodologies, and programming models. Her PhD research focused on developing tools, architectures and methodologies that help reduce the design time of embedded systems, particularly those implemented using FPGAs.

Since her arrival at SFU, she expanded her research to include computing architectures for silicon and non-silicon based technologies (including FPGAs, heterogeneous computing, Networks-on-Chip (NoCs), and Multi-Processors Systems-on-Chip (MPSoCs)).

== Awards and publications ==
Shannon was awarded the 2014 APEGBC Teaching Award of Excellence in recognition of her classroom and out-of-class mentoring activities and her contributions in leading a redesign of the school's undergraduate curriculum at SFU.

Her publications include "Odin II - An Open-Source Verilog HDL Synthesis Tool for CAD Research", "FUSE: Front-End User Framework for O/S Abstraction of Hardware Accelerators", and "Using reconfigurability to achieve real-time profiling for hardware/software codesign". Additionally, she has published articles such as "TAIGA: A new RISC-V soft-processor framework enabling high performance CPU architectural features", and "Performance and scalability of Fourier domain optical coherence tomography acceleration using graphics processing units".
