= Kapsowar =

Coordinates: 0°59′N 35°34′E

Kapsowar Town K Town
- Kapsowar Town
- Nickname: K Town
- Interactive map of Kapsowar Town

Government
  - Type: Democratic
- Elevation: 2,300 m (7,500 ft)
- Time zone: GMT +3
- Posta Kenya: 30705

Kapsowar is a town in Elgeyo-Marakwet County, Kenya. Prior to March 2013, it was located in the former Rift Valley Province. In 1994, Kapsowar became the headquarters of the former Marakwet district.it also hosts the only girls national school in the county.Furthermore, Kapsowar is the proposed headquarters for the Elgeyo Marakwet County. Prior to this, the Marakwet and Keiyo people were collectively grouped into the Elgeiyo-Marakwet District. In 2010, the two districts were again merged into Elgeyo-Marakwet County. The Marakwet number approximately 300,000 and are a part of the Kalenjin family of tribes, which collectively are the second-largest ethnic group in Kenya.

The fast growing town is located between the Kerio Valley and the Cherangani Hills. The land surrounding Kapsowar town is fertile and the elevation creates a mild climate with a temperature range of 70-85 °F (21–29 °C). Kapsowar town has a population of 66,684 (2019/census, total population of the Kapsowar town location). AIC Kapsowar Hospital, established by Africa Inland Mission in 1933, is largely responsible for the degree of development presently seen in the town.

== Kapsowar Hospital ==
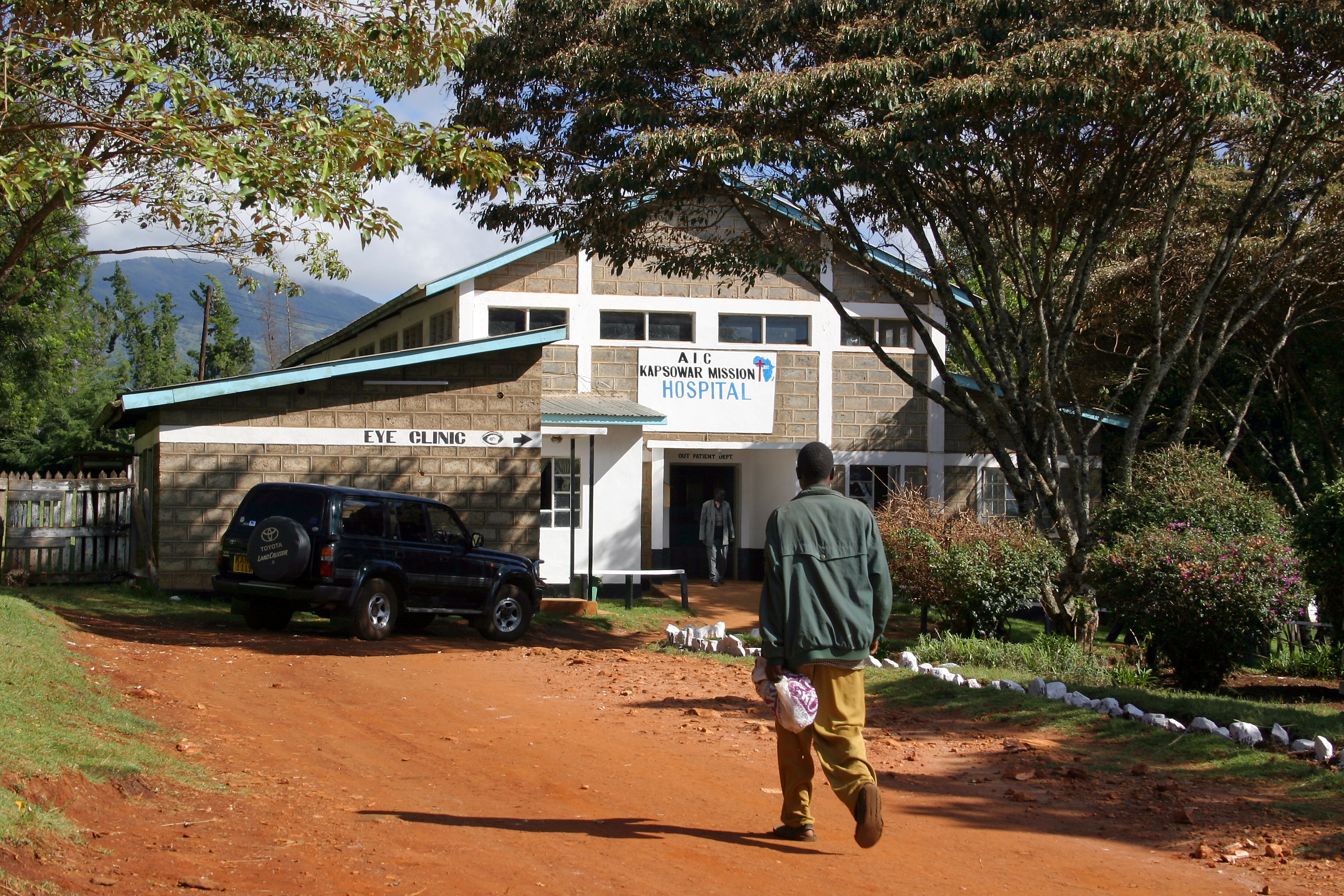
Kapsowar Hospital

Kapsowar Hospital was established by the Africa Inland Mission (AIM) in 1933 and transferred to the supervision of the Africa Inland Church Central Health Council.

The hospital serve the Marakwet people and also offers cleft treatment to patients. It offers four dispensaries that provide essential healthcare. It offers mobile maternal and child health clinics that can travel up to 90 kilometres (56 mi). The hospital offers antiretroviral therapy, curative in-patient services, family planning, HIV counseling and testing as well as immunizations. Among the approximately 4,000 inpatient admissions and 15,000 outpatient visits per year, the most common diagnoses for children constitute pneumonia, malaria, gastrointestinal infections, meningitis, and injuries/fractures. The majority of the diseases are communicable, including HIV/AIDS, lower respiratory tract infections, malaria, diarrheal diseases, neonatal preterm births, measles and tuberculosis.

Common emergency cases include child delivery, traumatic injuries, pelvic bleeding, intestinal obstruction, and peritonitis. Surgical procedures include thyroidectomy, tonsillectomy, vagotomy, pyloroplasty, chronic osteomyelitis amputation, hysterectomy, tubal ligation, C-section and eye surgery.

=== History ===
The Africa Inland Mission (AIM) established Kapsowar hospital with the primary goal of spreading the gospel. The Mission made an agreement with the elders of Talai, Marakwet to purchase the old government offices, 'boma', for the hospital. This represented a step forward in fostering relations between the church and the inhabitants.

On October 19, 1934, the first dispensary opened under the supervision of Reverend Reynolds. In September 1934, Lee Ashton and his physician wife joined the facility. Near the end of the year, the first Marakwet woman came in for childbirth.

Difficulties in finishing the hospital began to arise as the missionaries themselves became patients. In April 1938, Reverend Reynolds and his wife went on leave due to illness. Ashley had to serve as superintendent of the Mission station and Africa Inland Missions Schools as well as offering medical services. Various missionaries came to substitute for their previous partners: Mr. and Mrs. Powley, Reverend and Mrs. Richardson, Dr. and Mrs. W. B. Young, Robert Stanley Lindsay, nurse Banks and Phillip Morris. During the 1939-1945, some missionaries were instructed to render their services. The Local Native Council was advised to take over the dispensary due to irregularities of the missionaries.

By the end of 1949, about seven African women, not from Marakwet, were in nurse training along with five male dressers. The missionaries began training the locals to take over their roles. As Morris noted, "an African Christian who has received training at Kapsowar Hospital can lead charge of the dispensary. He is encouraged to have his wife and family with him and live in the midst of his tribe; he has the opportunity daily of preaching the word and healing the sick. The success of these very isolated areas depends upon the individual African - his spirituality and his ability." Also there was colonialist who lived where the current AIC Church, accompanies by coastal African staff that spoke swahili and lived in the Current kambi Swahili area which is part of Kapterik land. They bonded and inter married Kapterik clan and even spoke the Marakwet language. First traders in Kapsowar town were believed to be from Tanzania. They were first to introduce tea and other foods and drinks among the community members who only depended on Traditional African food.
