= Kishishe massacre =

2022 massacre in the Democratic Republic of the Congo

- Part of the M23 offensive (2022–present)
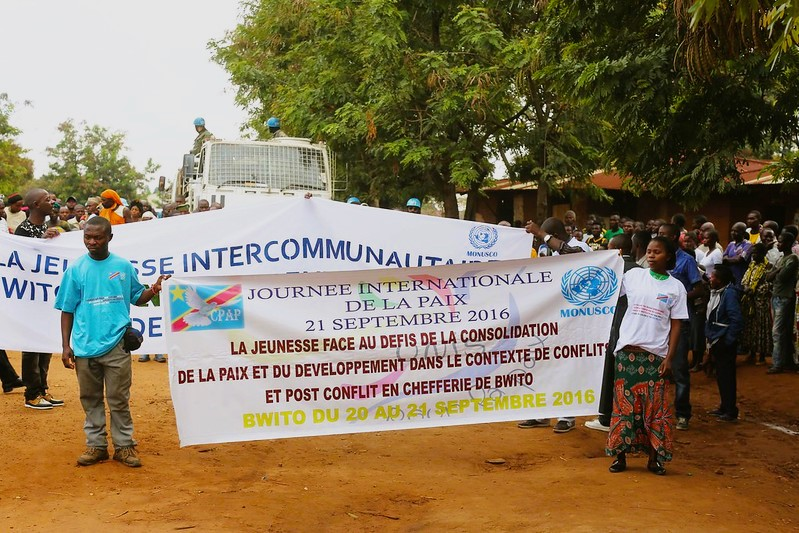
- Civilians marching in Kibirizi village, Mutanda groupement, in the Bwito Chiefdom
- Location: Bwito Chiefdom, Rutshuru Territory, North Kivu, Democratic Republic of the Congo
- Date: 21–30 November 2022
- Deaths: 171 civilians killed (per United Nations); 300+ civilians killed (per Congolese government)
- Perpetrator: March 23 Movement

The Kishishe massacre (French: Massacre de Kishishe) took place on 21–30 November 2022 in the Bwito Chiefdom of Rutshuru Territory, North Kivu, in the eastern Democratic Republic of the Congo. The atrocity was perpetrated by the March 23 Movement (M23), a predominantly Rwandan-backed Tutsi armed group, following clashes with local militias and FARDC. A preliminary investigation by the United Nations reported that at least 171 civilians were summarily executed, while Congolese authorities initially estimated the death toll at around 300. The killings began in the Tongo groupement, where over 64 civilians were executed in the villages of Muhindo, Rusekera, and Bugina, before M23 forces advanced into the Bambo groupement, targeting Kishishe, Kirumba, and Kapopi. In addition to mass executions, the assailants looted medical centers and other facilities.

The massacre led to the mass displacement of civilians, with hundreds of thousands fleeing to nearby locations such as Kanyabayonga, Kibirizi, Kashala, Kirima, Rwindi, Nyanzale, Kashalira, Bambu, and Kitchanga, while some sought refuge in neighboring countries. The attack provoked widespread international condemnation and outrage from Congolese political figures, including Juvénal Munubo Mubi, Martin Fayulu, President Félix Tshisekedi, Patrick Muyaya Katembwe, and Julien Paluku Kahongya.

== Background ==
The M23, a Tutsi-led rebel group defeated in 2013, resumed attacks in North Kivu in November 2021, citing the Congolese government's failure to uphold their security, economic, and political interests. The government had also backtracked on integrating M23 fighters into the national army, facing opposition from locals who viewed them as criminals requiring justice. Political scientist Jason Stearns pointed out that M23's leaders rank among the region's wealthiest landowners and businessmen. M23 also justified its resurgence by claiming to combat the Democratic Forces for the Liberation of Rwanda (FDLR), a Rwandan rebel group operating in eastern DRC since the aftermath of the 1994 Rwandan genocide. However, Stearns argued that there was "little evidence of an imminent threat from the FDLR to Rwanda in the run-up to the re-emergence of the M23 in November 2021".

Amid rising conflict, the Democratic Republic of the Congo's National Assembly passed a resolution on 8 November 2022 prohibiting negotiations aimed at integrating members of armed groups into the national security forces. Simultaneously, the East African Community Regional Force (EACRF) initiated its deployment, with Kenyan troops arriving in Goma on 12 November. However, the force's small size, capped at 900 personnel, and its ambiguous mandate rendered it ineffective as a deterrent against M23, which continued to advance. Fighting between the Armed Forces of the Democratic Republic of the Congo (FARDC) and M23 resumed on 20 October 2022 in Rutshuru Territory. The FARDC offensive quickly collapsed, allowing M23 to seize control of vast areas. By 29 October, the rebels had captured Rutshuru and Kiwanja, gaining control of a section of Route Nationale 2, the primary road linking Goma to Beni and Butembo. This shift increased Goma's reliance on trade with Rwanda. M23 continued its advance in three directions: south toward Goma, north toward Ishasha, and west through Virunga National Park into the Tongo groupement of Bwito Chiefdom, where the Kishishe massacre would later unfold. Despite FARDC's struggles against M23, local militias launched sporadic resistance. On 14 November in Rushovu and 17 November in Kanaba, local groups clashed with M23, inflicting casualties on the rebels. However, these attacks did little to halt M23's expansion, setting the stage for the atrocities that followed.

== Attack ==
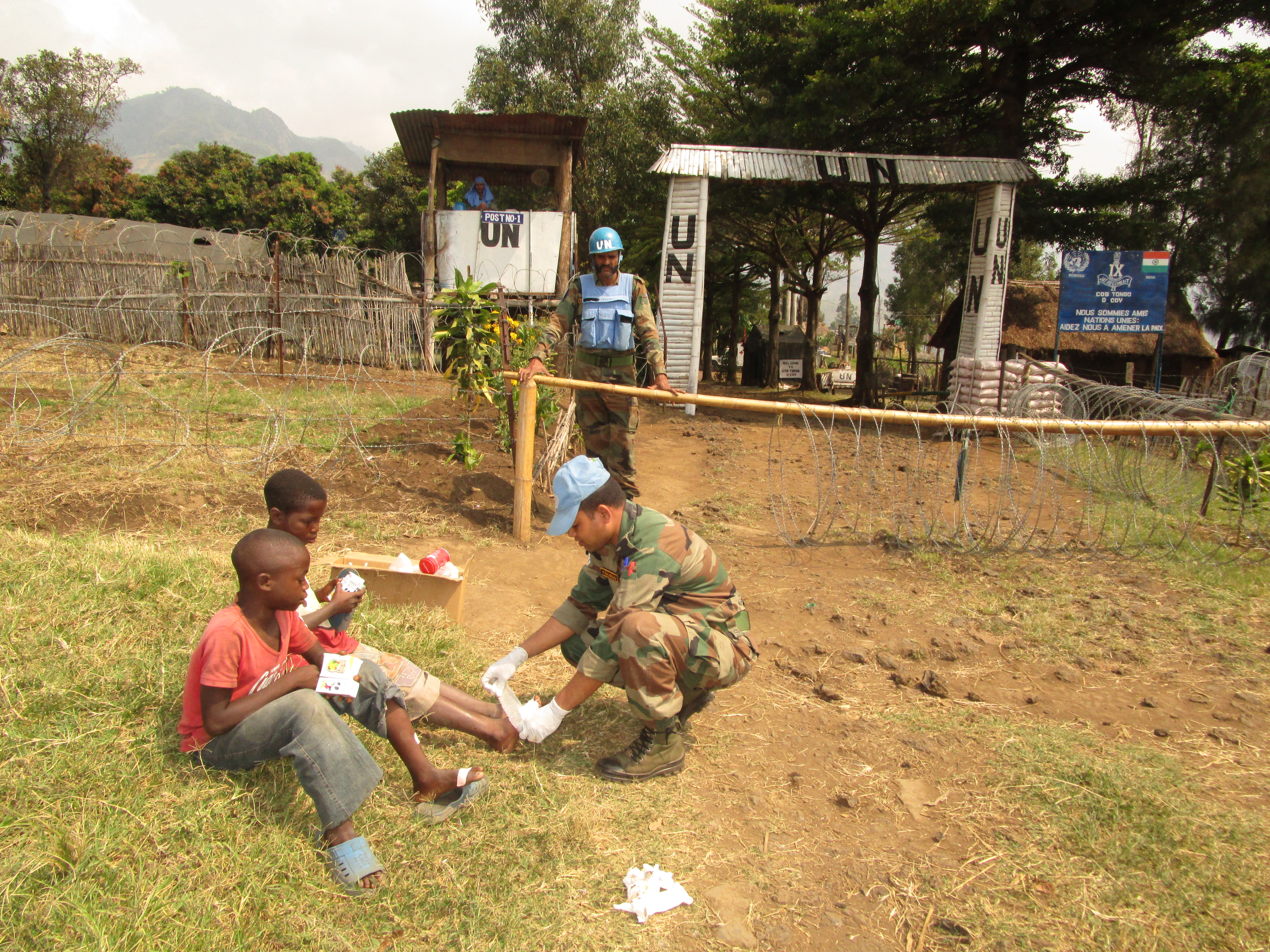
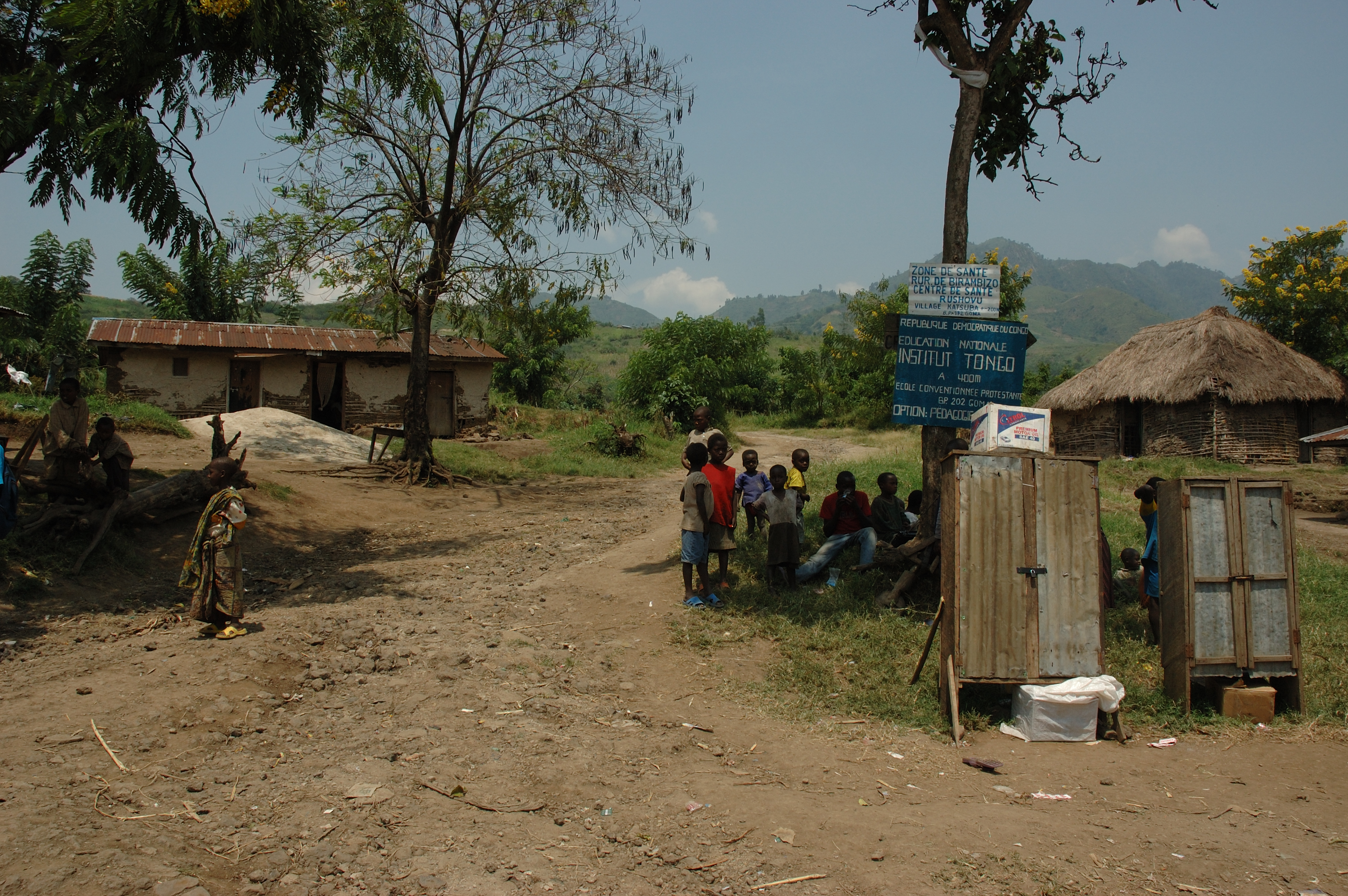
Tongo groupement, Bwito Chiefdom

In response to the killing of their fighters by local self-defense militias on 14 November 2022 in Rushovu and 17 November 2022 in Kanaba, the M23, supported by weapons from the Rwandan Defense Force (RDF), launched a series of attacks in Bwito Chiefdom, Rutshuru Territory. The rebels, reportedly originating from Mabenga and Tongo, both of which had fallen under M23 control by 16 November, carried out targeted assaults on civilian populations.

On 29 November, M23 initiated a manhunt in the Tongo groupement, executing over 64 civilians in the villages of Muhindo, Rusekera, and Bugina. The rebels systematically searched homes and summarily executed all males they encountered. Neither Congolese security forces nor MONUSCO peacekeepers intervened. The insurgents then advanced into the Bambo groupement, where they carried out further killings in Kishishe, Kirumba, and Kapopi, while also looting medical centers. The massacre lasted until 1 December 2022.

According to Radio Okapi, over 122 civilians were killed in Kishishe alone. Among the victims were children and their parents who had sought refuge in the Kishishe Adventist Church (Église Adventiste de Kishishe), where at least 60 people were massacred. David Héritier Kahombo, chief of the Bukombo groupement, reported that M23 engaged in widespread pillaging and sexual violence against women and girls. Amnesty International documented systematic executions of adult males and the rape of at least 66 women and girls, including cases of gang rape. Many survivors received only basic medical assistance, including post-exposure prophylaxis (PEP) for sexually transmitted infections, emergency contraceptives, and painkillers, but lacked adequate medical and mental health support.

On 5 December 2022, during a press briefing, Julien Paluku Kahongya, Minister of Industry and former governor of North Kivu, estimated that the death toll was around 300. The Armed Forces of the Democratic Republic of the Congo (FARDC) initially reported at least 50 civilians killed in Kishishe on 1 December, while the Congolese government revised the figure to "more than 100" the following day. M23 denied these numbers, acknowledging the deaths of only eight civilians, claiming they were killed by "stray bullets" during combat with local militias. A preliminary United Nations investigation determined that at least 131 civilians were executed. However, in its annual report published on 7 February 2023, the United Nations Joint Human Rights Office (UNJHRO) documented the summary execution of at least 171 people in Bambo and Kishishe between 21 and 30 November 2022.

== Reaction ==
The Kishishe massacre provoked widespread condemnation from both the Congolese government and the international community. President Félix Tshisekedi strongly condemned the massacre, describing it as the killing of "more than 100 compatriots in Kishishe", according to government spokesperson Patrick Muyaya Katembwe. Tshisekedi declared three days of national mourning, during which flags were flown at half-mast across the country. He also instructed the Minister of Justice to launch an internal investigation and work toward an international investigation into the incident, which was characterized as a war crime.

Denis Mukwege, a Nobel laureate and gynecologist known for his work with victims of sexual violence, expressed indignation at the massacre, calling for international mobilization against "Rwanda's aggression in the DRC". He urged the international community to impose sanctions against the M23 and RDF and hold the perpetrators accountable through national and international justice mechanisms. Juvénal Munubo Mubi, a Member of Parliament for Walikale, described the attack as "the largest since the creation of the M23". Martin Fayulu, a leading opposition figure, demanded that the United Nations Security Council sanction Rwanda, insisting that "Rwanda must stop its atrocities in the DRC". NGODH, a consortium of human rights organizations in North Kivu, urged the United Nations and the Congolese government to take immediate action by referring the case to the International Criminal Court (ICC).

The massacre also drew strong reactions from the international community. U.S. Secretary of State Antony Blinken urged Rwandan President Paul Kagame to cease all support for M23, citing deep concern over the impact of the fighting on Congolese civilians who had been killed, injured, or displaced. Blinken also called for adherence to the Angola-brokered ceasefire agreement, which was negotiated during a summit in Luanda on 23 November and required M23 to withdraw from captured positions.

The United Nations Organization Stabilization Mission in the Democratic Republic of the Congo (MONUSCO) called for an investigation into the massacre, while the European Union (EU) ambassador to the DRC demanded an immediate cessation of hostilities and respect for International Humanitarian Law (IHL). Several European countries, including France, as well as British Development Minister Andrew Mitchell, condemned the attack and emphasized the need for justice and accountability.

== See also ==
- Beni massacre
- Kipupu Massacre
- Mutarule
- Lemera
- Mulenge
- 2020 Democratic Republic of the Congo attacks
