= Bwito Chiefdom =

Chiefdom in Rutshuru Territory, North Kivu

- Chiefdom
- Chefferie de Bwito
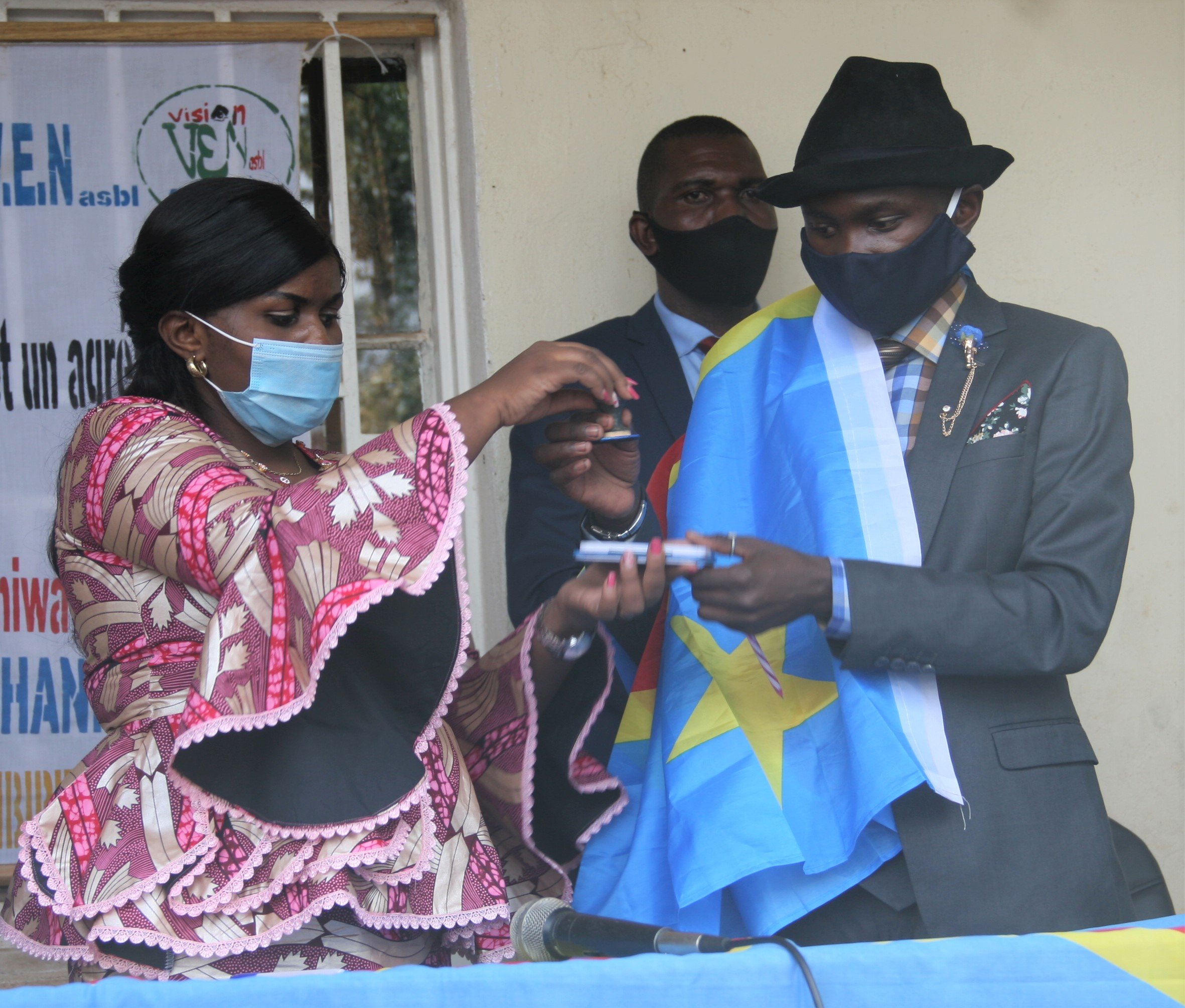
- Installation of Mwami Raphael Nyamulagha Kikandi III, September 2020
- Country: Democratic Republic of the Congo
- Province: North Kivu
- Territory: Rutshuru

Government
  - Mwami: Raphael Nyamulagha Kikandi III
- Time zone: UTC+2 (CAT)
- Official language: French
- National language: Kiswahili

The Bwito Chiefdom (French: Chefferie de Bwito) is a chiefdom located in the Rutshuru Territory of North Kivu Province in the Democratic Republic of the Congo (DRC). It is bordered to the north by Batangi Chiefdom and Kanyabayonga commune in Lubero Territory, Bwisha Chiefdom in the east, and to the north-east by Lake Edward and the Republic of Uganda. To the west, it is bordered by Bashali Chiefdom in Masisi Territory, and to the northwest by Wanyanga Chiefdom in Walikale Territory. To the south, it is bordered by Nyiragongo Territory.

The Bwito Chiefdom is predominantly governed by the Hunde people. The traditional chieftain, referred to as the "Mwami," is highly respected and plays a crucial role in maintaining law and order while conserving the cultural patrimony of the Bahunde. The region also accommodates Nande, Nyanga, and Twa (Pygmies or Bambuti) from adjacent territories, alongside a minor proportion of Hutus and Tutsis, who were resettled in the mid-20th century by Belgian colonial authorities.

== Geography ==
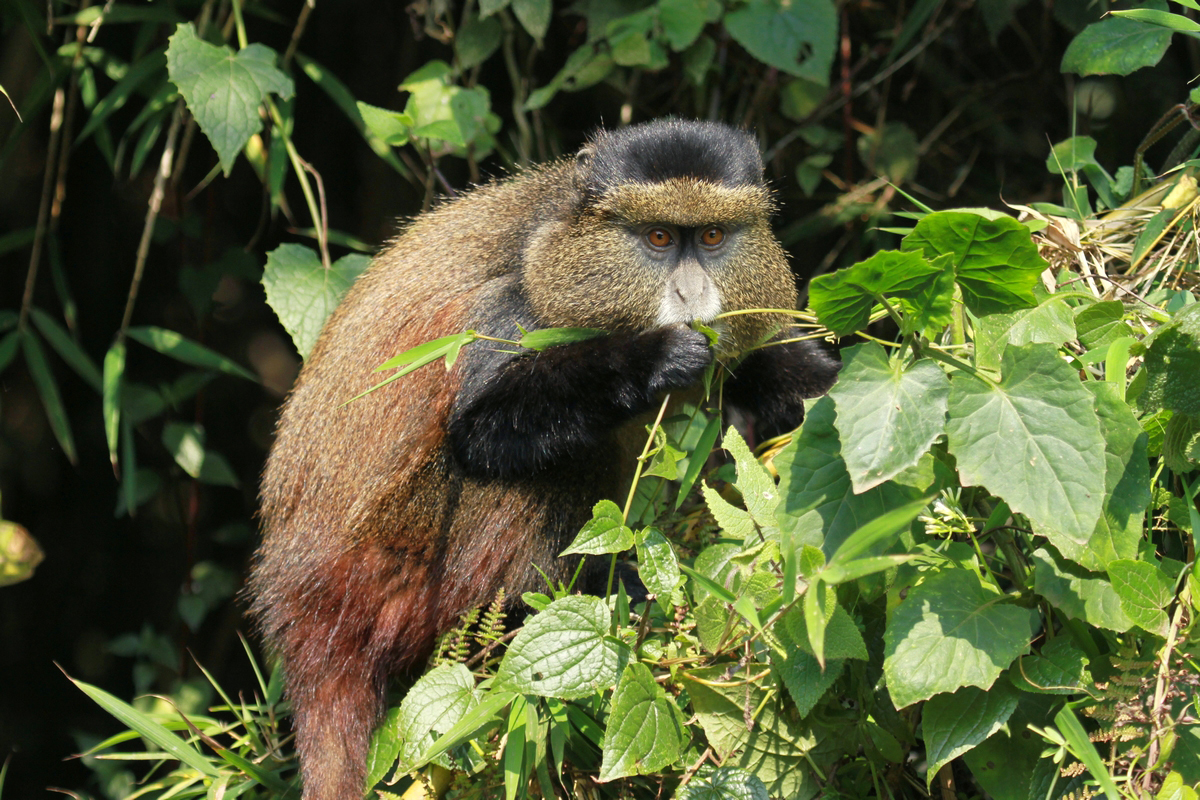
Golden Monkey (Cercopithecus mitis kandti) in Rutshuru Territory

Bwito Chiefdom is situated in the eastern part of the DRC, bordering Rwanda to the northwest and Lake Edward to the northeast. The region is marked by diverse topography, including hills, fertile plains, and dense forests. The northeastern border is defined by the shores of Lake Edward, a significant water body that also serves as an international boundary with the neighboring Uganda. The lake offers opportunities for fishing and trade with nearby communities. The fertile plains and rolling hills provide an ideal ecosystem for agriculture, which is the main economic activity of the locals. The local farmers cultivate a variety of perennial, annual, and industrial crops such as maize, beans, cowpea, cassava, cabbage, potatoes, sweet potatoes, rice, carrots, soybeans, onions, bananas, peanuts, plantains, palm oil, tubers, sorghum, sugarcane, pineapples, and coffee, which contributed to regional food security and livelihoods. The Bwito Chiefdom is also rich in natural resources, including an abundance of flora and fauna in its lush forests that cover a significant portion of the area and provide habitats for various wildlife species.

=== Administrative divisions ===
The Bwito Chiefdom is divided into smaller units called groupings (groupements), overseen by traditional leaders known as 'mwamis.' Each groupement is further subdivided into villages (localités) and is governed by customary chiefs. The groupement leader is appointed by the paramount mwami and is typically a member of the royal family, who also appoints village chiefs to head individual villages.

==== Groupements ====
As of 2018, the Bwito Chiefdom is made up of 7 groupements:

- Bambo
- Bishusha
- Bukombo
- Kanyabayonga
- Mutanda
- Tongo

== History ==
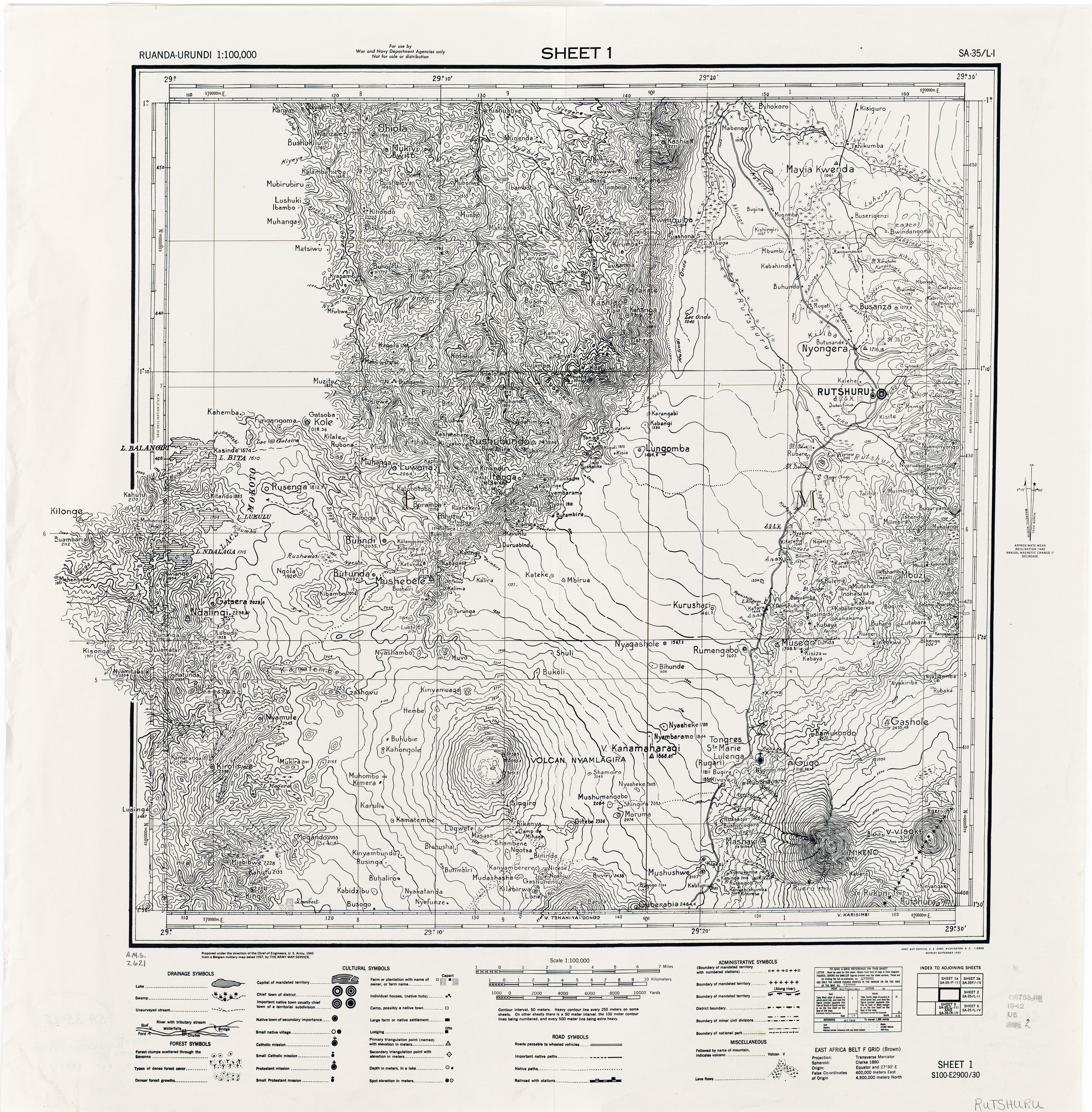
A 1942 map featuring the locations of Rutshuru and surrounding towns/villages

Formerly a part of the Bwisha Chiefdom, known as Binja, the Bwito Chiefdom emerged as a distinct entity following a key administrative reorganization in 1970. On November 18, the Rutshuru Territory was divided, resulting in the establishment of the Bwito Chiefdom as a distinct entity through Ministerial Decree No. 2163. The decree defined the newly formed Chiefdom's territorial boundaries and set up its administrative structure. The local population had mixed reactions to this development. While some were optimistic about the prospect of autonomy and a unique governance structure that catered to their specific needs, others were concerned about the potential impact on inter-community relations, resource distribution, and access to essential services. The successful establishment of the Bwito Chiefdom depended on the response and adaptation of its leadership. Traditional leaders and local authorities needed to recalibrate their roles within the new administrative framework. Cooperation and collaboration between leaders from the erstwhile Bwisha Chiefdom and the nascent Bwito Chiefdom were instrumental in maintaining stability during the transitional phase.

=== Security problems ===
Since the Masisi War of 1993 and the subsequent First and Second Congo Wars, the area has been beleaguered by pervasive security problems for the past three decades, which resulted in widespread violence, displacement of populations, and the proliferation of armed groups.

==== Masisi War (1993–1996) ====
The initial inter-ethnic war in 1993 pitted the Hundes against the Hutus, with young Nande combatants aligning with the Hunde following their violent expulsion of the Hutus from Walikale Territory and Lubero Territory. The conflict escalated as Ingilima fighters, a seasoned group from the region between Walikale and Bafwasende, entered Rutshuru Territory, specifically targeting the Bwito Chiefdom under the aegis of indigenous Hunde leadership. On May 12, 1993, during the tenure of Desire Kamoli Bukavu Shekerabeti, the Ingilima perpetrated a cataclysmic assault on Bwito Chiefdom, massacring numerous Hutus but sparing the Tutsis, who had previously extended considerations to them.

Survivors from Masisi Territory sought refuge in the Bwito Chiefdom, establishing settlements in border localities such as Bindja, Katsiru, Chahemba, Bishusha, and Mubirubiru. In late April, additional survivors from Walikale Territory also sought refuge. Despite proclamations from Bwito Chiefdom authorities that the conflict was primarily a concern of Walikale and Masisi territories, the Ingilima and their confederates launched a major offensive on May 12, 1993, culminating in extensive massacres of Hutus across numerous villages. The Hutus in the southern sector of the chiefdom mounted expeditions armed with machetes, spears, bows, arrows, and bamboo sticks cut into points to liberate their kin ensconced in the northern areas under Ingilima dominion and to impede their southern advance. These expeditions resulted in intense combat and casualties in Nyanzale on May 16, 1993. The situation further deteriorated in 1994 when Governor Moto Mupenda dissolved the Regional Pacification Committee and local committees, while DSP soldiers stationed in Rwindi, Kitchanga, and Pinga exhibited ethnic partiality, engaging in arbitrary detentions, plundering, and rekindling violence. The conflict reignited towards the year's end.

In 1995, Kinshasa's intervention through "Operation Kimya" sought to address the inter-ethnic strife in Bwito Chiefdom and Masisi Territory. Conducted by DSP soldiers and para-commandos from the 31st Division of Camp CETA, who had a prior history of looting in Kinshasa in 1991 and 1993, these troops exploited the chaos to further engage in pillaging and violence. The civil strife intensified in Bwito Chiefdom in April 1996 when the "Mayi-Mayi Kifuafua" assaulted DSP soldiers in Rwindi, causing them to flee and abandoning the civilian populace to the mercy of hostile armed factions, including Mayi-Mayi Kifuafua, pro-Hutu militias, Hunde, and Nande, leading to further massacres, looting, and widespread devastation.

==== First Congo War (1996–1997) ====
During the First Congo War, Bwito Chiefdom became a battleground for the Alliance of Democratic Forces for the Liberation of Congo-Zaire (AFDL) and the Rwandan Patriotic Army (RPA). The involvement of AFDL and RPA led to a series of atrocities that targeted the local population, particularly the Hutu Banyarwanda, in a campaign of terror and extermination. This campaign of terror and extermination escalated following the dismantling of the Katale and Kahindo refugee camps, leading to an influx of Rwandan Hutu refugees into Bwito Chiefdom, where they integrated with the local populace. This intermingling set the stage for a brutal crackdown by AFDL and RPA forces to eliminate perceived threats and solidify their control over Zaire's natural resources within the region.

In late October 1996, mere weeks after the assault on the Katale refugee camp, AFDL/RPA units descended upon the village of Rusovu in the Tongo groupement. At least 88 civilians, predominantly Hutu Banyarwanda, were brutally killed. The soldiers corralled the villagers into approximately 15 houses and executed them with hoes and hammers, targeting their heads. Subsequently, they set the houses ablaze. The violence escalated in November and December 1996, with AFDL/RPA forces perpetrating massacres across villages of Bambu groupement, notably in Musanza, Marangara, Kanyangili, Kagando and Kishishe. In Musanza, Marangara, Kanyangili, Kagando, and Kishishe, at least 200 civilians, mostly Hutus, were slaughtered. In Kagando, the soldiers deceitfully assembled villagers under the pretext of distributing food and salt. Once gathered, the villagers were locked in houses that were then set on fire, killing them en masse. Further atrocities occurred in the village of Duane in the Tongo groupement during the same period. AFDL/RPA elements arrested 85 Hutu civilians during a combing operation. The victims were bound, confined in a house, and subsequently burned alive. Their remains were interred in small mass graves.

On December 31, 1996, in Bukombo groupement, AFDL/RPA soldiers gathered approximately 300 civilians, primarily Hutus, under the guise of holding a meeting. Once gathered, the soldiers opened fire, killing men, women, and children indiscriminately. Before departing, the soldiers looted medical supplies and destroyed the local hospital. The violence continued into 1997. On March 11, elements of the AFDL/RPA massacred dozens of civilians in the village of Mushababwa in the Bambu groupement. As in previous incidents, the soldiers gathered the villagers ostensibly for a meeting, then opened fire indiscriminately, killing many on the spot. Just two days later, on March 13, 1997, the village of Kazuba in Bukombo groupement faced a similar fate. Hundreds of civilians were killed after being assembled by the pastor of the Adventist church at the behest of the soldiers. Many were shot within the church, while others were burned alive in their homes. The indiscriminate killings spared no one, with men, women, and children all falling victim. The spate of killings culminated between April 12 and April 19, 1997, in the village of Kabizo. Over one hundred civilians, mainly Hutus, were assembled under false pretenses by the soldiers. Most victims were bludgeoned to death, and their bodies incinerated, with one source reporting 157 fatalities.

==== Second Congo War (1998–2002) ====
In the Second Congo War, the region once again became embroiled in conflict when Laurent-Désiré Kabila attempted to assert his independence from former allies. This move was allegedly due to ethnic tensions and suspicions that Tutsis were aligned with Rwanda's interests rather than those of the DRC. Laurent-Désiré Kabila viewed the Tutsis as a potential threat to his regime, leading to heightened animosity. In response, the Tutsis, supported by RPA, rapidly mobilized and formed the Congolese Rally for Democracy (RCD) to compel Laurent-Désiré Kabila to step down. On August 2, 1998, at 4 p.m., Commander Sylvain Buki, on behalf of the 10th Brigade of the FAC (Force Aérienne Congolaise), read a press release on the airwaves of the Radio-Télévision Nationale Congolaise (RTNC) station in Goma, announcing the deposition of the President of the Republic. This message was echoed by the 12th Brigade stationed in Bukavu, signaling a significant escalation in hostilities. Subsequently, violence resumed in Bwito Chiefdom, and clashes between government troops and the RCD forces and their allies intensified. The chiefdom experienced numerous massacres, particularly in the Rutshuru-Kanyabayonga axis, which became perilous for travelers, including the area known as Mayi ya Moto. Several people lost their lives, and vehicles were looted. In the villages of Bwito, terror reigned for an extended period as the RDC and RPA forces subjected the locals to looting, burning of houses, and raping women and girls. Entire villages were left in ruins, and their communities were shattered by the brutality of the conflict. Amidst the chaos, centers under the control of RCD soldiers and the RPA saw an opportunity to expand their influence. These centers became refuge points for displaced people fleeing from the destruction of their villages, such as Nyanzale and Kitchanga. Some of the displaced people sought shelter in the Virunga National Park to escape violence. During this period, attacks on vehicles became commonplace, with both sides engaging in looting and resorting to violence against passengers. The rebels killed passengers or used them as carriers for transporting looted goods.

==== National Congress for the Defence of the People ====
Following the end of the Second Congo War in 2003, the region fell into a state of turmoil as remnants of RCD rebels occupied the area. Among them was General Laurent Nkunda, a Tutsi from Mirangi village in Mutanda groupement, who had been a senior officer in the RCD rebel military group since 1998. In December 2006, Nkunda established his armed movement, the Congrès National pour la Défense du Peuple (CNDP), settling in Bwiza, a locality straddling the Rutshuru and Masisi territories. Nkunda's return from the war in Bukavu, where he fought alongside Colonel Jules Mutebutsi, another Tutsi who rebelled against the FARDC (Forces armées de la république démocratique du Congo) in 2004. In Bwiza, Nkunda actively recruited men and raised awareness for his CNDP movement, which he chaired himself. He also led attacks on the FARDC forces based in Bwito Chiefdom and Masisi Territory after the 2006 elections. These attacks resulted in the division of Bwito Chiefdom into two parts. One part remained under the control of the central government, including the groupements of Kanyabayonga, Kihondo, Bambo, and Mutanda. The other part came under the management of the CNDP and included the groupements of Bishusha, Tongo, and Bukombo. In response to the situation, the FARDC launched offensives on both axes to regain control of the groupements under CNDP management. The 9th Integrated Brigade concentrated on the Kalengera-Tongo axis, while the 2nd, 7th, and 15th Integrated Brigades targeted the Nyanzale-Katsiru axis. Nonetheless, these offensives were later suspended, adopting a different approach at the beginning of 2007. During this period of conflict, the chiefdom suffered immensely. According to human rights organizations, many lives were lost, economic structures were destroyed, and villages were reduced to ruins. The crisis forced many people to flee their homes, leading to the establishment of displaced camps in various locations, including Katsiru, Kasoko, Kihondo, Bambo, Singa, Nyanzale, Luve, Mutwangano, and nearby areas.

In 2019, the former interim chief of Bwito Chiefdom, Désiré Bukavu Shekerabeti, was killed near Kikuku.

==== Kisheshe massacre ====
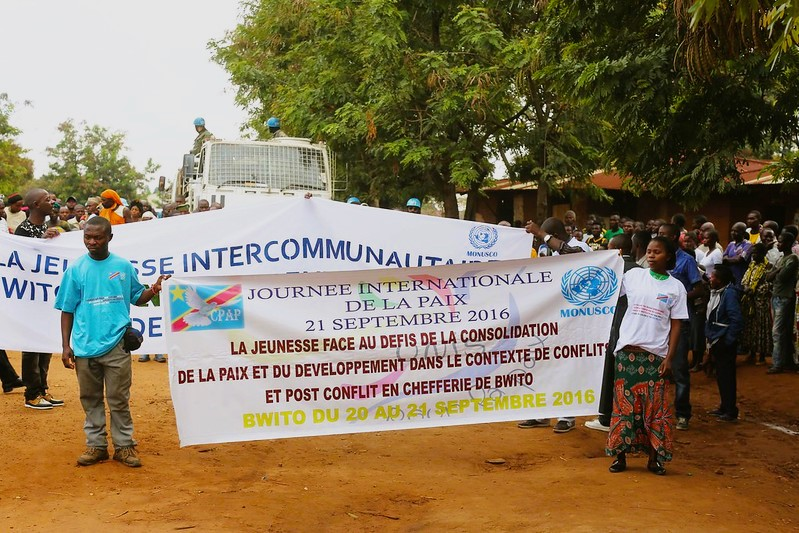
Civilians marching in Kibirizi village, Mutanda groupement, in the Bwito Chiefdom, September 2016

During the Kishishe massacre, which occurred between 21–30 November 2022, the March 23 Movement attacked the chiefdom, resulting in the deaths of hundreds of civilians in Bambo, Tongo, and Bishusha groupements. The United Nations conducted a preliminary investigation that confirmed 171 deaths, while Kinshasa authorities reported an alarming death toll of approximately 300. According to human rights organizations and local sources, the massacre began in the Tongo groupement, where the insurgents executed more than 64 people in the villages of Muhindo, Rusekera, and Bugina. The armed rebels then moved into the Bambo groupement, carrying out a second wave of attacks, targeting the villages of Kishishe, Kirumba, and Kapopi, where innocent civilians were caught in the crossfire. Deaths were also reported in Bishusha groupement. The rebels indiscriminately killed men, women, and children, and they also pillaged medical centers in the area, depriving the community of essential care and comfort. The very institutions that provided care and comfort to the community fell victim to the brutal aggression.

==== Ongoing violence ====
During 2023 and early 2024, widespread fighting erupted in Bwito Chiefdom between the Rwandan-backed Tutsi insurgent group M23 and FARDC, supported by local Wazalendo militias. From January 3 to January 4, 2024, intense clashes between M23 insurgents and FARDC contingents occurred in the Bukombo groupement and the Mufunyi/Shanga groupements of the neighboring Bahunde Chiefdom in Masisi Territory. Radio Okapi reported at least five deaths and five individuals kidnapped by the M23. Civil society and local notables discovered three cadavers in Mashiga village of the Bukombo groupement on January 3, with an additional five people reported missing in Muko village on the same day. Meanwhile, two deaths were reported in Bitonga, Mufunyi/Shanga groupements in Masisi Territory, including that of a local notable named Bagabo Moise. Since October 2023, over 400 educational institutions in Rutshuru Territory have remained closed due to almost constant insecurity, affecting villages in Bukombo, Bishusha, Tongo, and Bambo groupements.

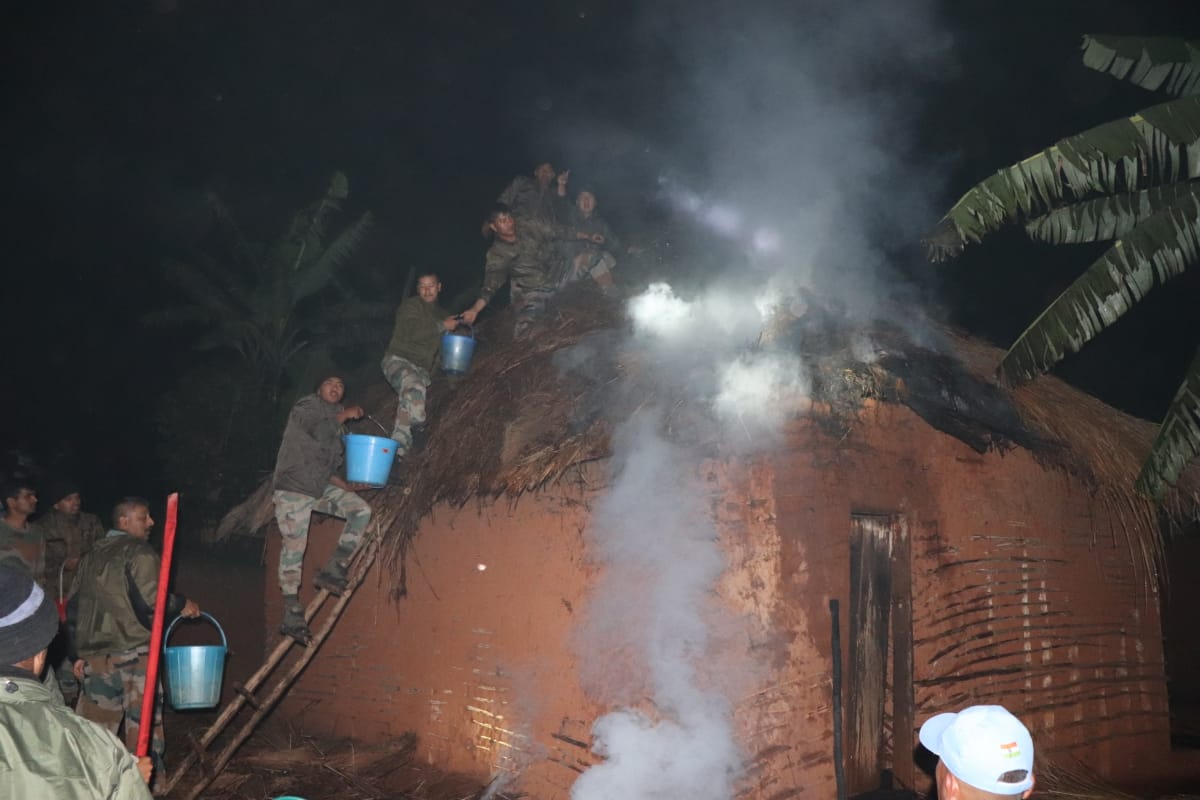
MONUSCO peacekeepers from India intervened to put out a fire in Biondi neighborhood in Kanyabayonga, 2021

On January 26, the M23 indiscriminately bombarded FARDC and local militia positions in Kanyangoye, Masisi Territory, resulting in 19 civilian casualties. The injured received prompt medical attention at Mwesso General Hospital (Hôpital Général de Mwesso). On January 27, numerous humanitarian workers evacuated Mwesso and its vicinity. The same day, M23 rebels executed coordinated offensives in Bushuwe, Kabati, and the Kilolirwe axis, obstructing multiple vehicles at Nturo in Kilolirwe. Heavy artillery explosions were reported in Bashali Chiefdom, and Kyahemba within Bwito Chiefdom. FARDC and M23 also clashed in Karuba, Mushaki in Bahunde Chiefdom, and Butale and Kibachiro (monastery) in Bashali Chiefdom. On January 31, reports emerged of M23 rebels recruiting teachers in four groupements of Bwito Chiefdom.

On March 4, 2024, Radio Okapi reported the resurgence of violent clashes between M23 rebels and the Congolese army, along with local militias, in Bwito Chiefdom, particularly around Nyanzale and along the Mabenga axis. At approximately 5 a.m. on Monday, the detonation of both heavy and light weaponry was heard in Matete village, situated between Kishishe and Kirima on the Mabenga axis, as well as in Kisoko, Mubirubiru, and Lwahanga villages near Nyanzale. Around 7:30 a.m., two bombs struck the village of Kihondo near the MONUSCO peacekeeper base in Nyanzale, inflicting multiple injuries. This assault incited widespread panic and triggered a mass exodus, with hundreds of families fleeing Nyanzale and neighboring villages such as Bwalanda, Kashalira, and Kirima in the Mutanda groupement, heading northward towards Kanyabayonga via Kibirizi. By March 6, M23 had seized control of Kibirizi, Kikuku—the capital of Bwito Chiefdom, Bwalanda, and the pyrochlore mining town of Somikivu. This takeover precipitated another wave of displacement, with thousands, predominantly women and children (including expectant mothers), trekking through Virunga National Park to reach Kanyabayonga. Radio Okapi reported that many of the displaced endured severe weather exposure, resulting in fatalities. Kanyabayonga itself lacks a potable water supply network, and local health facilities receiving sick and displaced individuals, including pregnant women, faced operational challenges due to a shortage of medical supplies.

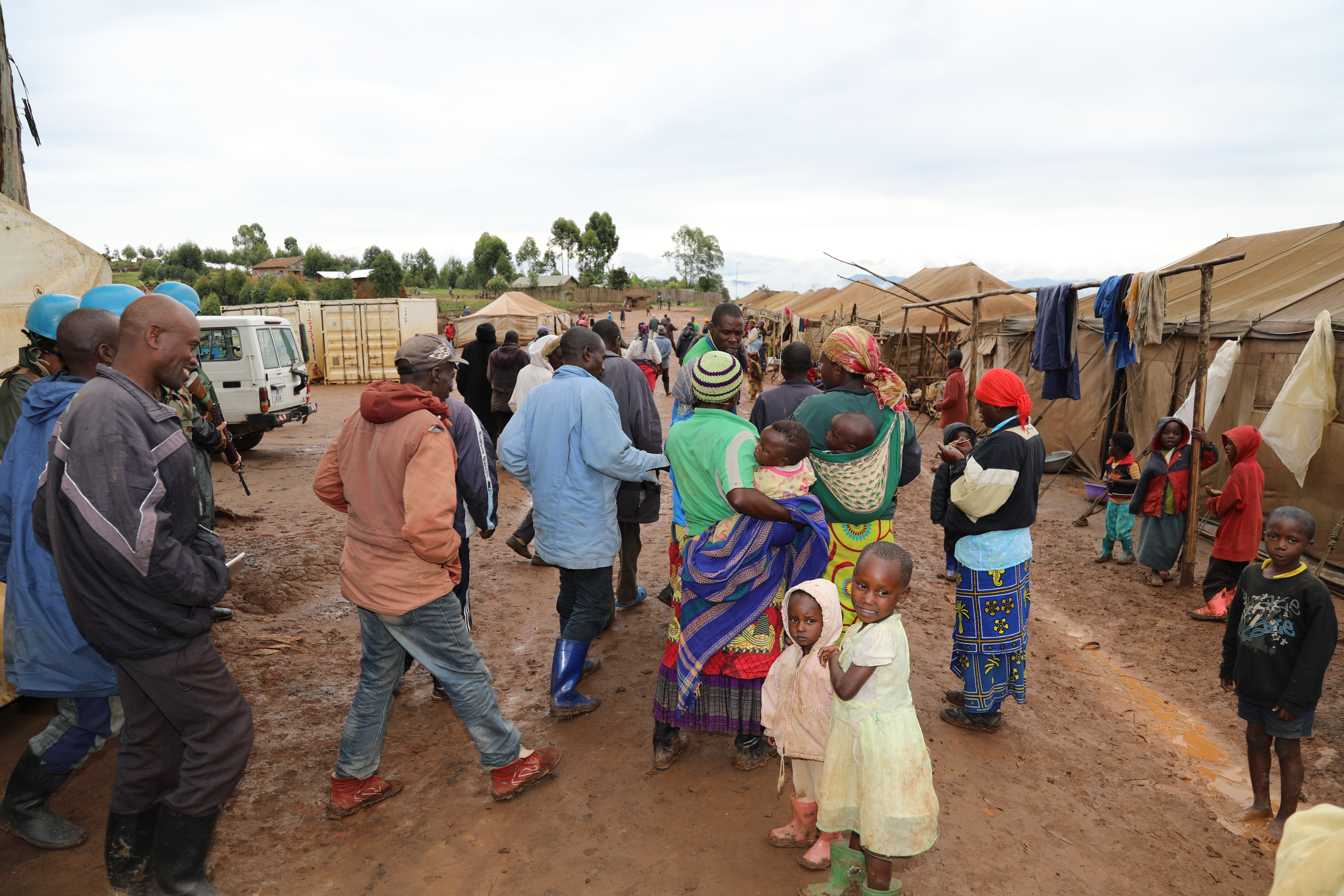
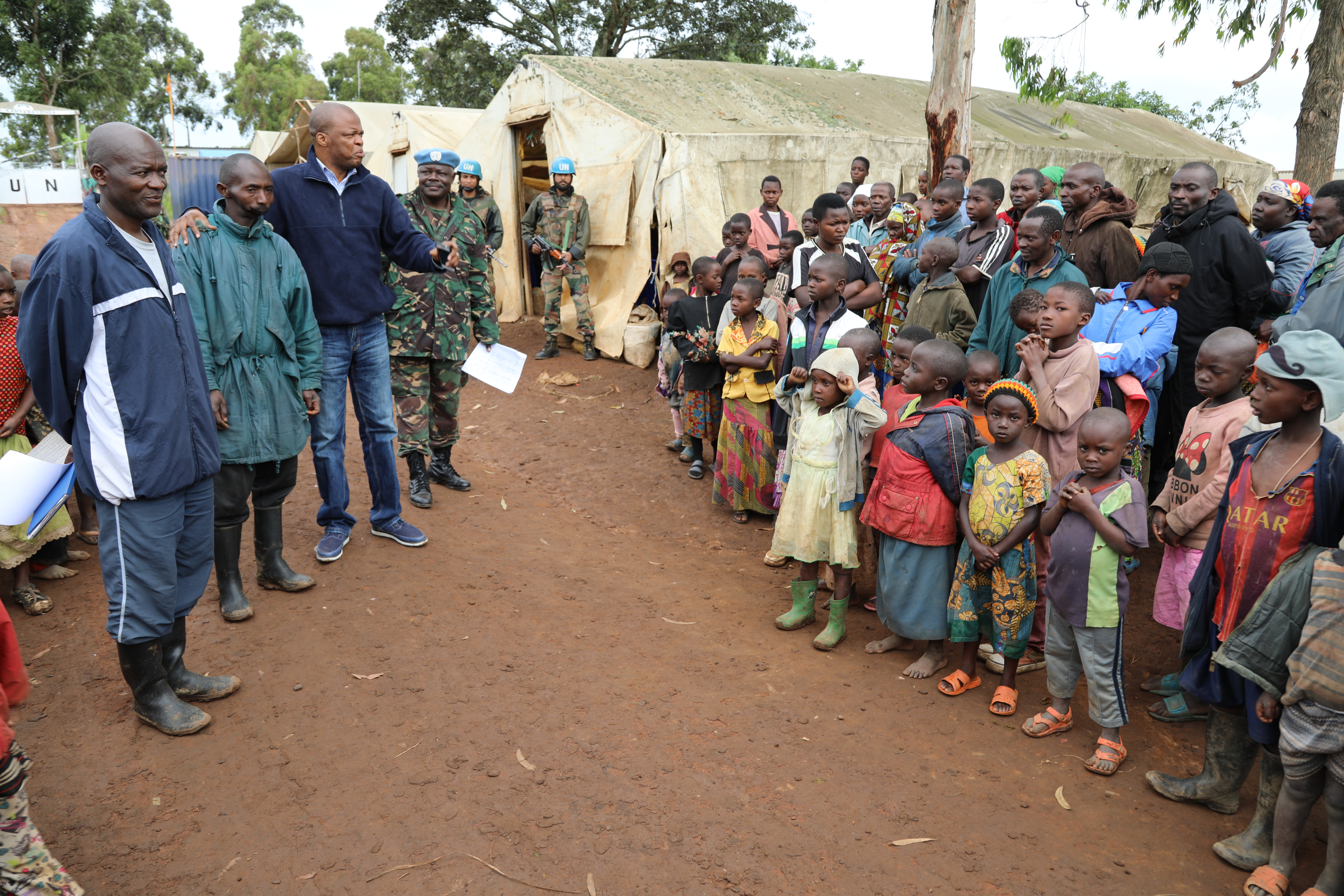
Displaced households in Kanyabayonga

On Friday, March 8, the M23 captured Kashuga and Misinga, approximately 10 km from Mwesso in Masisi Territory. Supported by the Rwandan military, the M23 advanced towards Kalembe, bordering Walikale Territory. They subsequently targeted the Mabenga-Katanda axis and the Kanyabayonga axis. Several sources indicated that the northern advance of the rebels exerted pressure on the towns of Rwindi and Vitshumbi on Lake Edward. With financial support from the European Union, the regional NGO Umoja in Action delivered hygiene kits to at least 3,000 displaced teenage girls in Kanyabayonga. On March 9, the M23 rebels occupied the Rwindi axis. Some sources reported that the elements of M23 were withdrawn but believed to be camping in the surrounding area. Isaac Kibira, a notable from Bwito Chiefdom, stated that neither the FARDC nor the M23 rebels controlled Rwindi at that moment. The same day, another wave of 16,000 displaced households arrived in Kanyabayonga with 2,012 in Mirangi, 3,472 in Birundule, 502 in Iyobora, 4,913 in Lusogha-Bubishi, and 1,042 in Lusogha-Buheri. According to Colonel Alain Kiwewa, Lubero Territory Administrator, some displaced people stayed with host families, churches, and others in schools. Students from primary schools in Vuvogho, Rwindi, Amani, Maendeleo, and the Furaha Institute shared classrooms with displaced people. By March 25, Radio Okapi reported that the number of displaced people in Kanyabayonga had increased to 76,274. Ten displaced people were reported dead in Kanyabayonga due to hunger and lack of medical care. Two other deaths were reported by civil society. The International Committee of the Red Cross, in collaboration with the Red Cross of the Democratic Republic of the Congo, indicated, in a press release made public on March 28, that it had assisted more than 44,000 people displaced by the conflict who had settled in camps around the city of Goma.

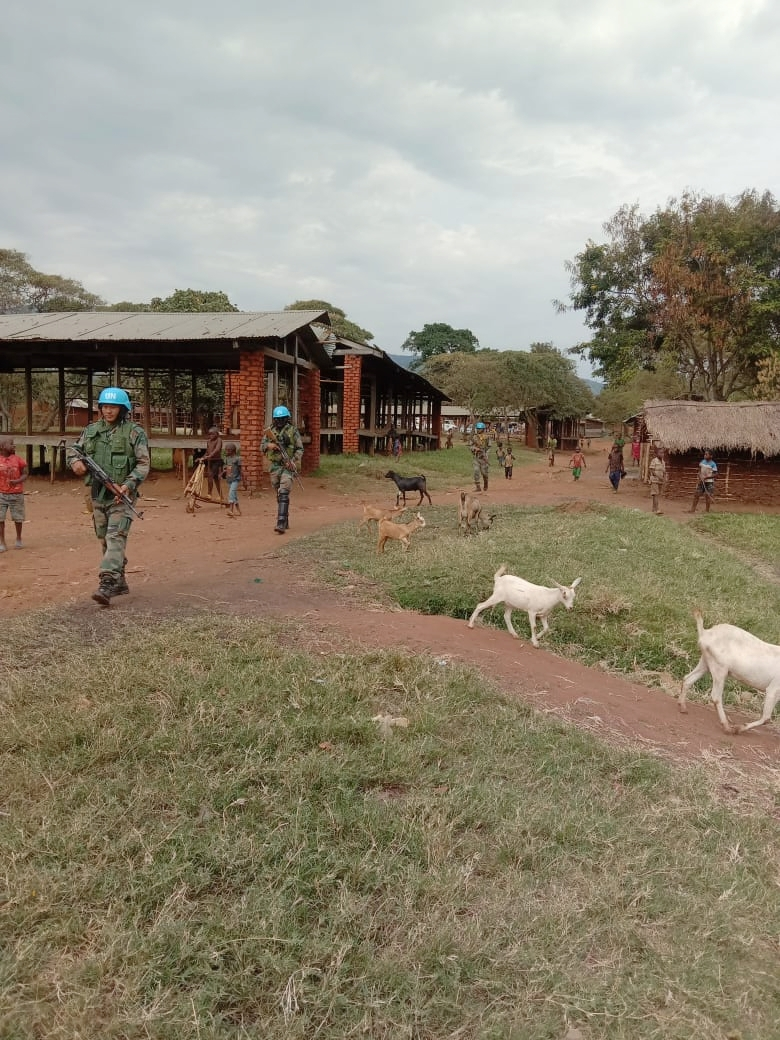
MONUSCO peacekeepers from India carrying out a force projection by launching an area-domination patrol in the region

On Tuesday morning, April 2, detonations of heavy weapons from clashes between the FARDC and the M23 rebels were heard on the Sake-Mushaki axes, in the Masisi Territory, and Rwindi-Kanyabayonga in the north of the Rutshuru Territory. Wazalendo supported the army during these clashes. Earlier on April 1, Wazalendo made an advance on the ground, recapturing the hills of Bwambaliro, Vunano, and Mianzi-Kimoka following the fighting against the M23 on the Sake-Kirotshe and Sake-Kitshanga axes. On April 3, local sources reported that the M23 rebels reoccupied the hills of Bwambaliro, Vunano, and Mianzi-Kimoka overlooking Sake on Tuesday evening after being dislodged briefly in the morning by Wazalendo. The following day, between 8 a.m. and 11 a.m. local time, M23 launched four bombs towards Sake, which landed in various locations, including a military camp in Kasengezi near Mugunga, and two near FARDC and SAMIDRC bases in Mubambiro, resulting in the death of a young girl and injuries to four other civilians. The fourth bomb was dropped in the Mayutsa district, south of Sake, without causing casualties. Subsequent fighting between M23 and FARDC, with its Wazalendo allies, diminished in intensity by late morning, particularly around Kibirizi and Rwindi in northern Rutshuru Territory, and Sake. FARDC reported that an M23 attempt to break through to Kanyabayonga was repelled with the assistance of Wazalendo.

On April 5, local sources indicated that an exchange of fire between M23 rebels and Wazalendo occurred between 7 a.m. and 8 a.m. on the Kibirizi-Birundule-Kanyabayonga axis, while the Sake axis remained calm. By April 22, Richard Kalume, a representative of displaced persons in Kanyabayonga, announced that the number of deceased displaced persons had risen to 18. The following day, Kalume implored the government to restore peace in rebel-occupied areas to enable displaced persons to return to their original environments, noting that children were resorting to begging and young girls to prostitution for survival. The non-governmental organization Groupe de Volontaires pour la Promotion de la Paix (GVPP) subsequently warned that thousands of displaced persons from Rutshuru were struggling to access potable water in Lubero localities, with more than 18 deaths due to water-borne diseases recorded in Kanyabayonga.

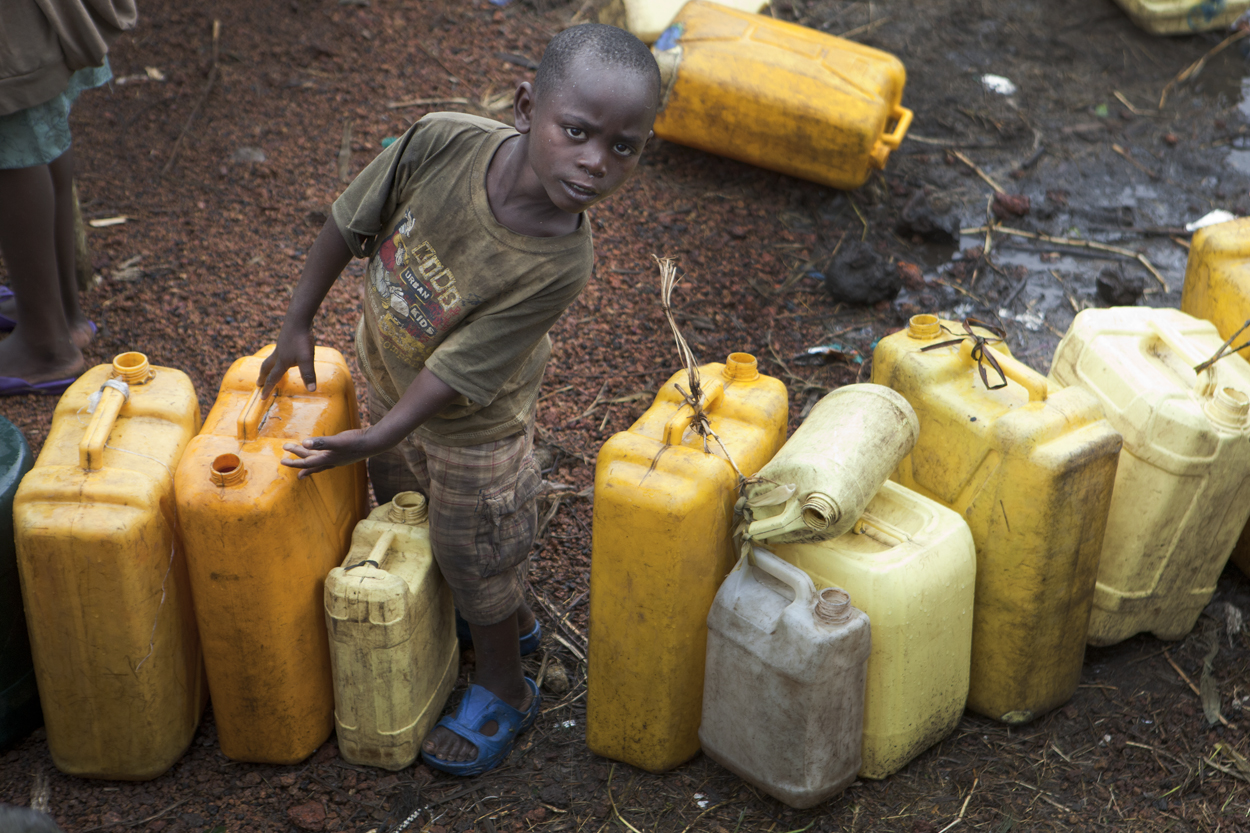
IDP camp of Kanyaruchinya in the outskirts of Goma where thousands of residents of the Rutshuru Territory gathered after fleeing combats between FARDC and M23 rebels

On May 14, at 5 a.m., clashes between FARDC and M23 rebels were reported around Kikuku. FARDC bombings targeted several M23 positions near Kikuku, with reports of heavy M23 artillery. These battles precipitated another wave of displacement, with hundreds of households fleeing Kikuku and surrounding areas towards Kanyabayonga, Lusuli, and Mutanda. On May 18, FARDC and Wazalendo conducted large-scale operations to dislodge M23 from North Kivu. FARDC gained control of the hills overlooking Kashuga, Misinga, and Ibuga localities. However, sources in Matanda and Kanyabayonga confirmed that Kibirizi-Rwindi and Vitshumbi remained under M23 occupation despite multiple attempts by the army to reclaim these areas. On May 26, FARDC, supported by Wazalendo, and the M23, with support from the Rwanda Defence Force, were reported to be fighting in the peripheral areas of Kanyabayonga. The FARDC was also shelling M23 positions in Rwindi, within the Virunga National Park, as well as in Kibirizi village in the Mutanda groupement. The M23 rebels retaliated against the FARDC's artillery as it attempted to recover the Rwindi base. Other sources from the Kibirizi area reported a mass exodus of the population towards Kabanda and other nearby villages, notably Kiahala, Bihundule, and Mirangi. Hostilities resumed with high intensity around 5 a.m. local time on May 27 in the villages of Kitereko, Lusuli, and Kanongo. Consequently, nearly all villages located between Kikuku and Kyaghala were evacuated by their inhabitants, while FARDC continued to shell Mutanda and its surroundings to forestall the M23 rebels' advance towards Kanyabayonga. There were also reports of FARDC and M23 rebels clashing in Masisi Territory, particularly around the strategic hill of Ndumba, which overlooks the village of Shasha, where FARDC intended to completely dislodge the M23 rebels from Shasha and Bitonga. The following day, fighting continued on the Burundule-Mirangi axis, between Kikuku and Kanyabayonga. According to Radio Okapi, detonations of heavy and light weapons were reported since 9 a.m., when FARDC launched several bombings to impede the M23 rebels' advance towards Kanyabayonga.

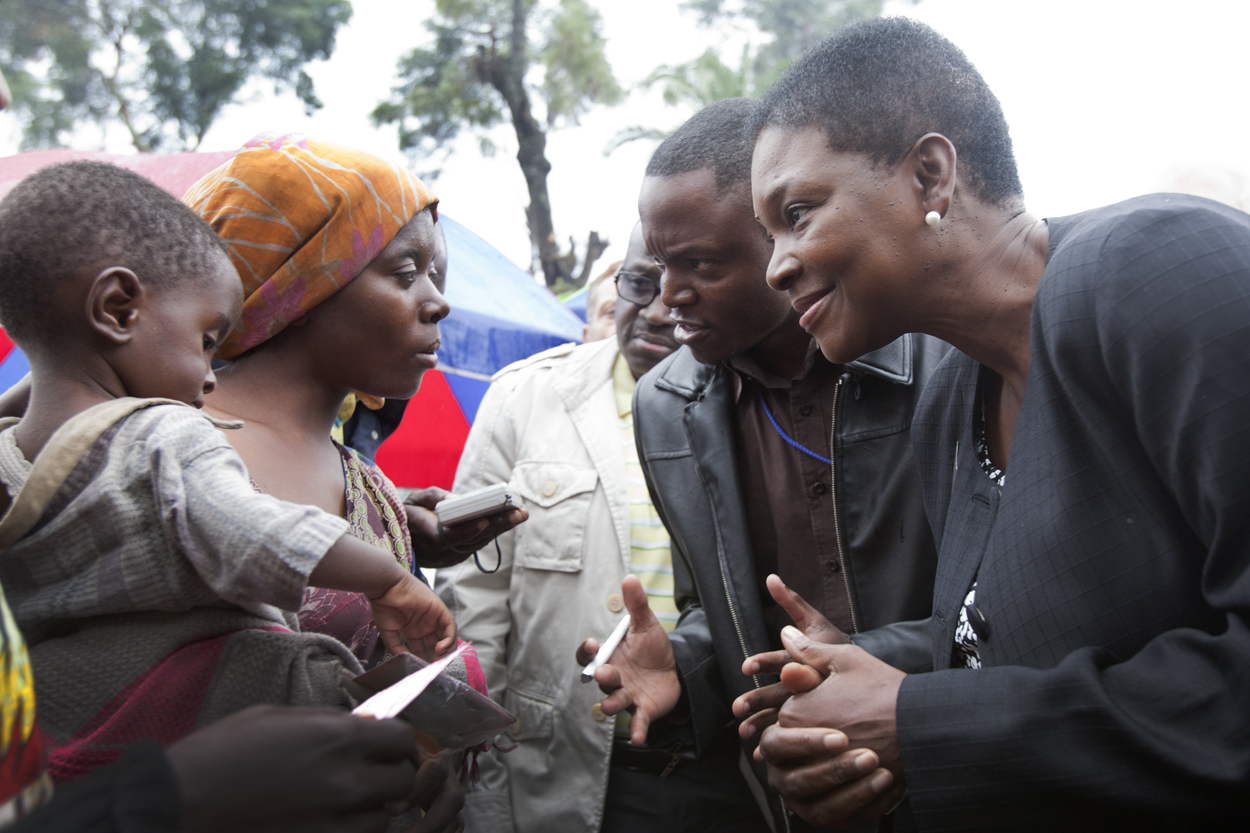
USG for Humanitarian Affairs, Valerie Amos visits IDP camp of Kanyaruchinya

On May 30, the FARDC, supported by the Southern African Development Community (SADC) force, targeted M23 positions in Sake. Lieutenant-Colonel Guillaume Ndjike, spokesperson for the FARDC in North Kivu Province, affirmed that FARDC had halted the rebel movement in Sake. According to security sources, the FARDC and SAMIDRC attacked several M23 positions, resulting in significant casualties on the M23 side, thereby ensuring Sake and its surroundings remained under FARDC control. Later that day, M23 rebels occupied the village of Bulundi, approximately ten kilometers from Kanyabayonga. On May 31, the M23 dropped several bombs in Sake, killing four civilians en route to the fields in Lutobogo near Sake. Kanyabayonga was swiftly vacated by almost its entire population. On June 1, an operational coordination meeting between MONUSCO and FARDC occurred in the morning. Later that day, MONUSCO deployed peacekeeping forces in Kanyabayonga to protect civilians and support the FARDC against advancing M23. With this support, the FARDC maintained control over Kanyabayonga and responded to M23 assaults. However, security sources reported that the M23, reinforced with troops, simultaneously opened two fronts on two axes leading to Kanyabayonga: Rwindi-Kanyabayonga and Birundule-Kanyabayonga. The belligerents utilized heavy and light artillery during these clashes, with detonations audible as far as Kirumba, over 40 kilometers from the combat zone. On June 2, two M23 units located in Bulindi and Mayisafi were bombarded. The rebels' attempt to advance towards Kanyabayonga was thwarted by FARDC, supported by the MONUSCO Intervention Brigade. FARDC and peacekeepers conducted patrols around and within the area.

On June 4, military sources in North Kivu assured that Kanyabayonga was surrounded and protected by FARDC and MONUSCO Intervention Brigade who patrolled inside and outside. However, fighting persisted between FARDC and M23, supported by the Rwandan government, in the Kabasha, Kinyamuyaza, and Buchi bwa Nyama hills, 10 km southeast of Kanyabayonga, opening the way to Butembo and Beni. FARDC and M23 clashed with heavy artillery fire, targeting different positions. Despite being counterattacked, M23 advanced to Kilambo, 6 km from Kanyabayonga. Later that June, FARDC Northern Front command, covering the area from Kanyabayonga to Goma, instructed all local armed groups called Wazalendo, active in the Beni-Butembo and Lubero, to identify themselves to the nearest army units. The army accused some Wazalendo groups of "working for the enemy" in the fighting zone between FARDC and M23 around Kanyabayonga. Colonel Mack Hazukay of Operation Sokola 1 of Great North targeted the Front des Patriotes Pour la Paix/Armée du Peuple (FPP/AP) of Kabido and the Union des Patriotes Pour la Libération du Congo (UPLC) of Kambale Mayani. Colonel Hazukay warned that after 48 hours, non-compliant groups would be considered enemies of FARDC.

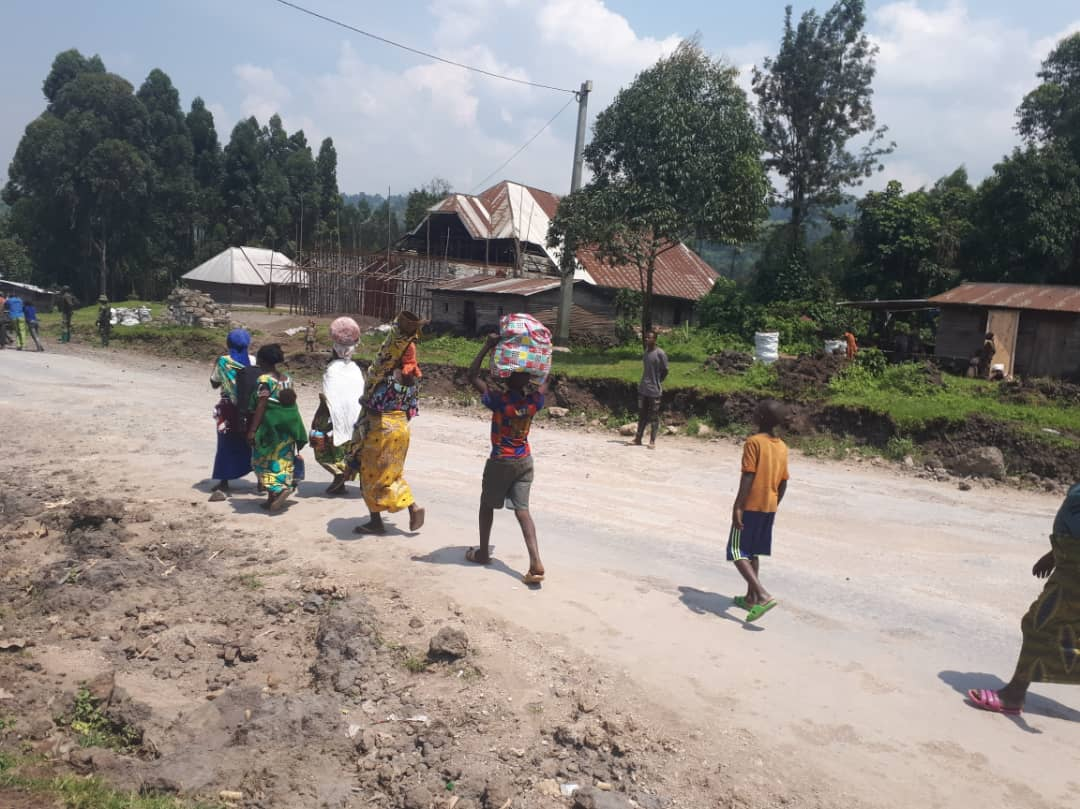
Residents from multiple households head towards Rugari Centre, fleeing their villages in the Kisigari region due to clashes between FARDC and M23 forces.

By June 7, local sources reported that FARDC launched an offensive to regain control of Mirangi, Kihala, and Lusuli, which had been under rebel control for several days. These villages, opening the way to Kikuku, Nyanzale, Mutanda, and Kishishe in Rutshuru Territory, are roughly 30 km from Kanyabayonga. Military sources indicated these localities constituted a "rear base" for M23 operations towards Kanyabayonga. The FARDC sought control over Mirangi, Kihala, and Lusuli to cut off rebel support around Kanyabayonga. Later that day, violent clashes erupted on the Kikuku-Kanyabayonga axis in the northern Bwito Chiefdom, pitting FARDC and its Wazalendo allies against M23. These clashes, lasting until late evening, resulted in FARDC reconquest of several villages, moving the fighting away from Kanyabayonga. Intense battles occurred in Mirangi, Lusuli, and Kyaghala, enabling FARDC to dislodge M23 and restore control. Despite these gains, M23 maintained control over Lusogha and Bulindi, between the reclaimed villages and Kanyabayonga. Clashes were also reported in Kikuku, and along the Kabasha-coat of arms axis in Virunga National Park towards Rwindi. These hostilities caused civilian displacement and approximately ten civilian deaths in Kyaghala. On June 8, Daniel Kamwanga, president of Kanyabayonga civil society, noted a gradual return of the population over the past two days, involving at least 50% of the regional population. Kamwanga urged the army to maintain pressure on M23 to facilitate continued population return. Nonetheless, reports indicated the return of M23 in several Bwito Chiefdom villages, notably on the Kikuku axis. Radio Okapi reported that a coalition of three local armed groups briefly regained control of Mirangi, Lusuli, and Kyahala after a clash with M23, although the rebels returned the next day with reinforcements. M23 continued to control most of Bwito Chiefdom from Bulindi, 10 kilometers southwest of Kanyabayonga. However, FARDC and its allies controlled the area extending from Kilambo-Bitongi to Kanyabayonga. On June 10, two mortar shells landed in Kanyabayonga, indicating that FARDC continued to contain the rebels beyond Bulindi. In the afternoon, two girls aged 12 and 13 others were injured by at least ten bombs launched by M23 rebels in Kanyabayonga, with local sources reporting that at least two shells fell in Mughola.

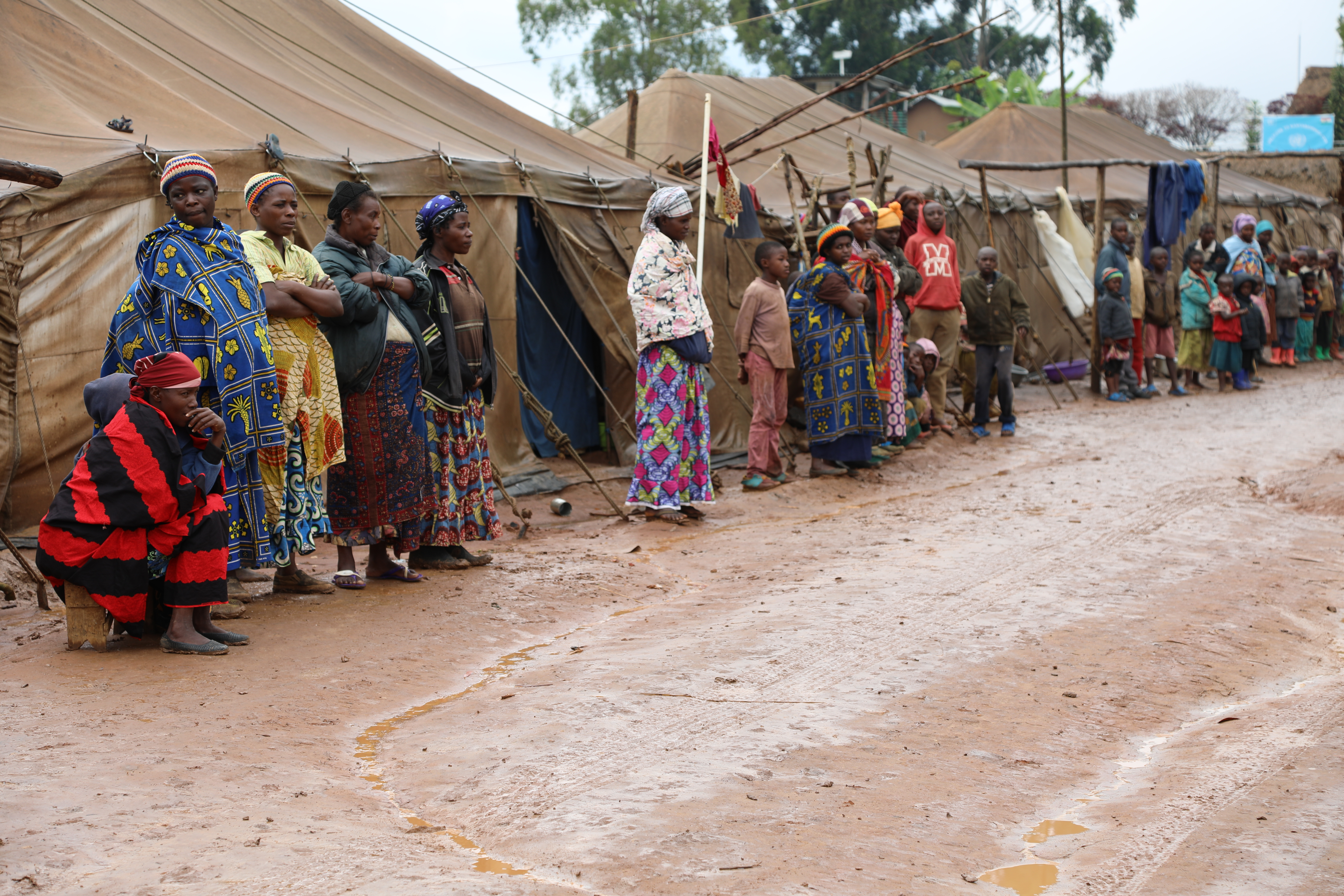
Displaced families seeking refuge in Kanyabayonga

On the night of June 11, the Kishishe police commander was fatally shot in Kanyatsi amid skirmishes between the FARDC and M23. Five civilians were injured following bombs dropped from the combat zone. On the morning of June 13, the FARDC and Wazalendo launched an assault against M23 insurgents near Bulindi, approximately ten kilometers from Kanyabayonga, with the objective of dislodging these rebels who had occupied the village for ten days. Some civil society representatives expressed concern about the protracted nature of the fighting along this axis, prompting massive population displacement towards the south of Lubero and towards Ikobo in the Walikale Territory. Later that day, the M23, with backing from the Rwanda Defence Force, attempted to reoccupy Butalongola, close to Kanyabayonga, but were repelled by FARDC and Wazalendo forces. During these confrontations, six mortar bombs from the combat zone impacted the vicinity of Kanyabayonga, injuring a twelve-year-old girl.
