= Kitchanga =

Capital and urban center in Bashali Chiefdom, North Kivu

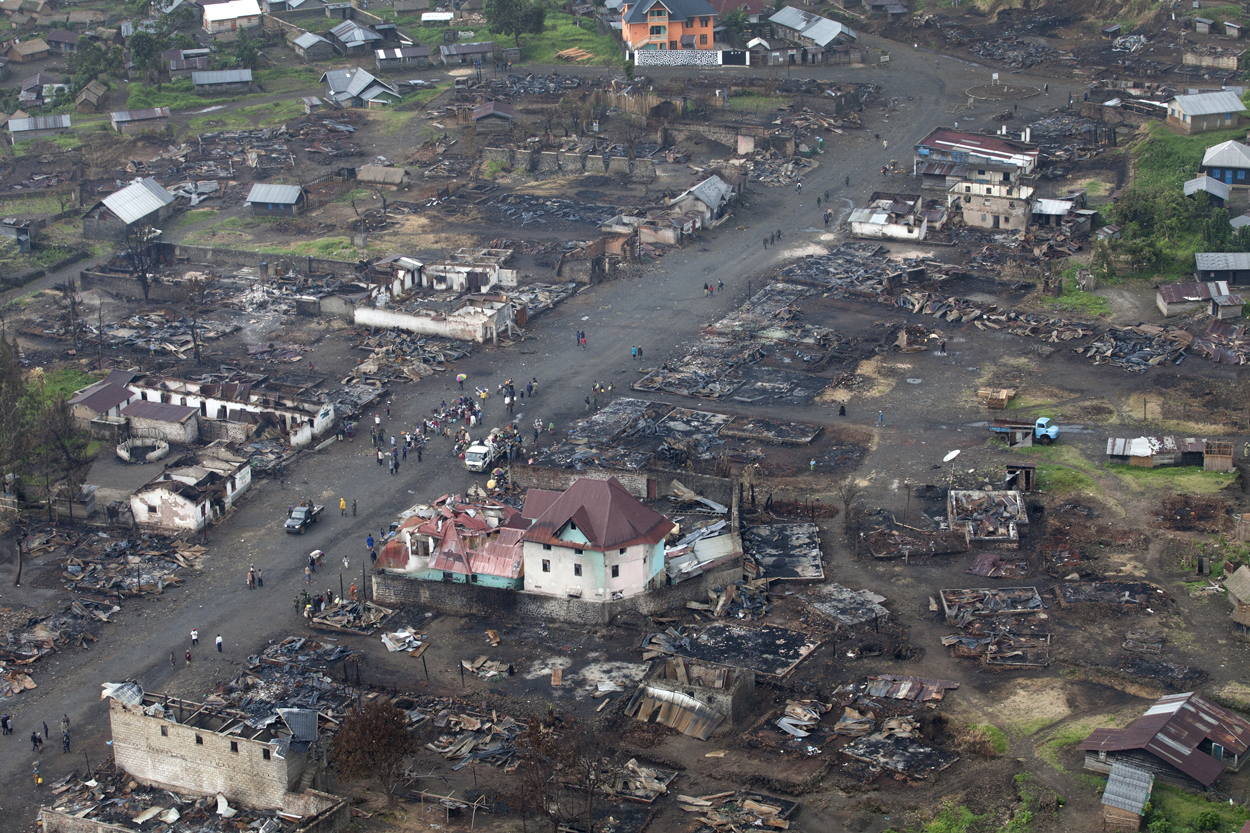
- Kitchanga town center destroyed after heavy fighting between the APCLS militia and the FARDC, March 2013

- Location within Democratic Republic of the Congo
- Coordinates: 01°15′8″S 29°3′32″E
- Country: DR Congo
- Province: North Kivu
- Territory: Masisi and Rutshuru
- Chiefdom: Bashali

Population (2015)
  - Total: 18,927 for the Masisi Territory and 25,157 Rutshuru Territory
- Time zone: UTC+2 (CAT)
- Official language: French
- National language: Swahili
- Climate: Aw

Kitchanga, also known as Kitshanga, is a town and a camp for Congolese Internally Displaced People (IDPs) strategically positioned between Masisi and Rutshuru territories of the North Kivu Province, with a vantage point overlooking Lake Kivu in the eastern region of the Democratic Republic of the Congo (DRC). Administratively, the Masisi part of Kitchanga functions as a larger urban center and the capital of the Bashali Chiefdom, while the other part is situated in the Bwito Chiefdom of the Rutshuru Territory. Geographically, Kitchanga is located approximately 90 km northwest of Goma and 10 kilometers north of Burungu, in close proximity to the villages of Kizimba and Budey. As of 2015, the population of Kitchanga was estimated at 18,927 for the Masisi Territory part and 25,157 for the Rutshuru Territory, excluding the populace within the displaced sites of Kahe and Mungote adjacent to Kitchanga in the Masisi Territory.

During the 1990s, Kitchanga experienced a rapid demographic surge. The region's infrastructure evolved with the construction of wooden, brick, and multi-storey houses, coupled with the development of roads, utilities, and a diversified local economy comprising various commercial enterprises, positioning Kitchanga as one of eastern DRC's burgeoning cities and boomtowns. The predominant economic activity is subsistence agriculture, with local agrarians producing crops such as maize, beans, potatoes, and assorted vegetables. Animal husbandry also constitutes a pivotal component of the local economy. It provides a source of income along with dairy products, meat, and ancillary by-products for local consumption and commerce. Kitchanga also hosts various service-oriented businesses, including healthcare facilities, educational institutions, and hospitality establishments.

Since the First Congo War, Kitchanga has been affected by the protracted conflict that has engulfed the region, becoming a site of violence and mass displacement. On 20 November 2012, the M23 rebel military group seized control over significant portions of North Kivu Province, eventually capturing the provincial capital of Goma. The M23's reign was characterized by widespread human rights abuses, including the conscription of child soldiers, sexual violence against women and girls, and the forced displacement of civilians. Consequently, Kitchanga has become a shelter for those fleeing violence while concurrently functioning as a contested town, a rebel stronghold, and combat zone.

== History ==
=== Traditional Inhabitants and Belgian colonial migration policies ===
Kitchanga was traditionally inhabited by the Hunde people. During the era of Belgian colonial rule, the Hunde community was organized into their newly-established self-governing entity known as the "Hunde Chiefdom," presided over by a traditional chief who enforced colonial law and order. This establishment of localized governance fostered a semblance of self-governance while ensuring the stringent implementation of colonial mandates.

In the 1930s, Belgian colonial administration planned and organized a migratory movement of labor from neighboring Rwanda towards eastern part of then Belgian Congo. The territory of Ruanda-Urundi, having been annexed as a protectorate under Belgian colonial rule, housed a dense populace, whereas the Belgian Congo, also under Belgian jurisdiction, encompassed regions marked by notably sparse population densities. The Belgian colonists favored the proclivity for the influx of these Banyarwanda transplanted laborers and migrants seeking sanctuary in the eastern precincts of the Belgian Congo as the local populations had vacated due to the forced labor imposed by white farmers. The Banyarwanda, primarily settled in strategic locations such as Masisi Territory in present-day North Kivu Province, Itombwe in present-day South Kivu Province, and the Vyura Mountains above Moba in Katanga Province, were seen as a solution to the labor shortages.

=== Atypical chiefdoms, the Kanyarwanda War, and ethnic conflicts ===
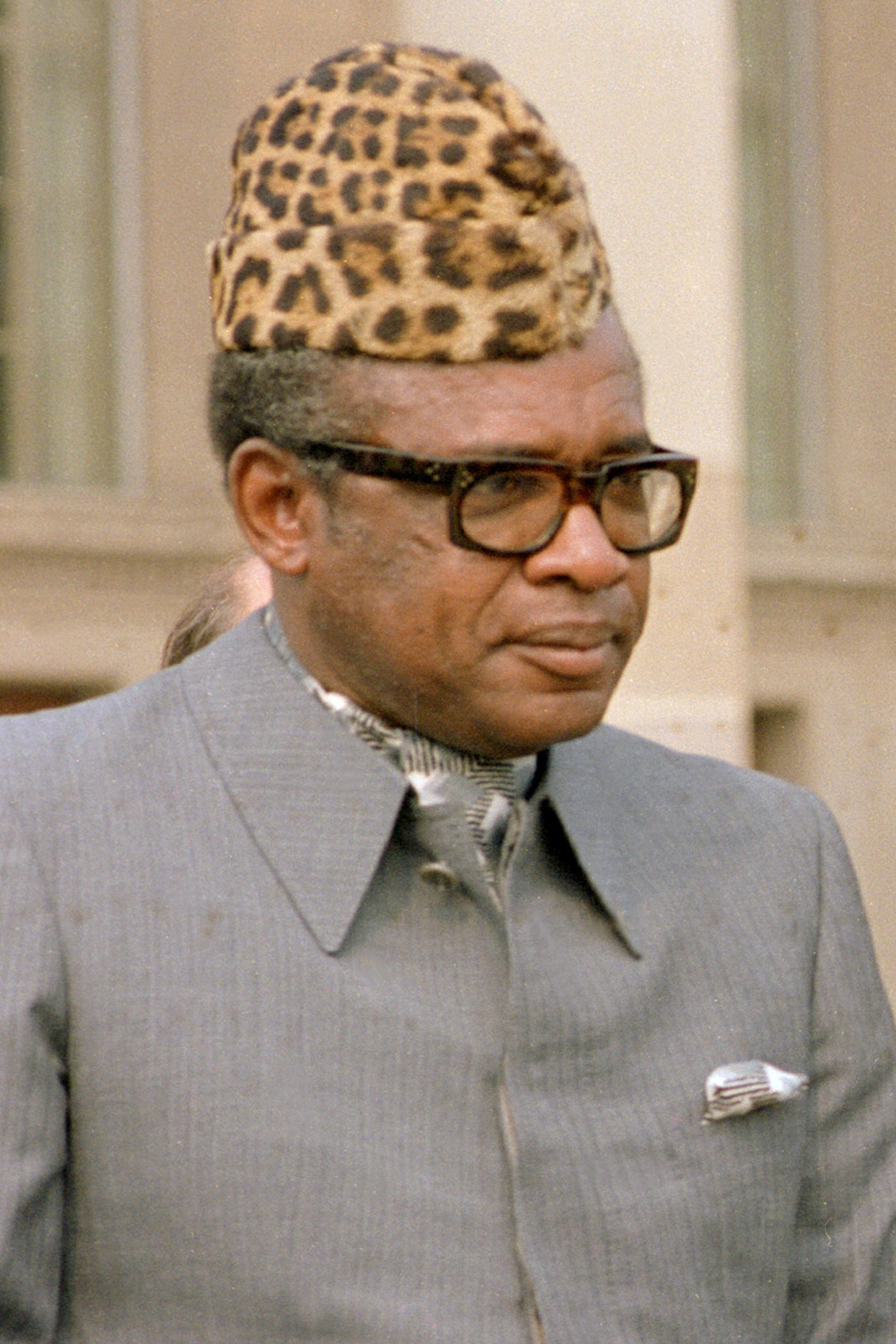
Mobutu Sese Seko sporting a typical abacost in 1983

To accommodate the Banyarwanda immigrants, the Belgian colonizers instituted "atypical chefferies [chiefdoms]" for Banyarwanda, including the establishment of the Bwisha Chiefdom and Gishari Chiefdom. These territories, covering an expanse of 34,910 hectares (350 km2), were procured by colonial authorities through duress in 1939 from the Bahunde chieftains, with the intent of providing habitation for Banyarwanda immigrants. In 1938, Mr. Leenaerts, a Belgian administrator transplanted from Ruanda-Urundi, made his way to the region with the charge of overseeing the welfare of the immigrants he had previously supervised in Rwanda. After his visit, he was eventually succeeded by Chief Bideri from Rwanda, who, in turn, was replaced in 1941 by another Rwandan chief named Buchanayandi. The establishment of these chieftaincies and the appointment of Rwandan immigrants as traditional chiefs incited ethnic conflicts between the Banyarwanda immigrants and the Hundes, with the latter asserting their ancestral claims to the land. In 1957, the Hundes regained control of Gishari, merging it into the Bahunde Chiefdom. Administrative reorganizations culminated in December 1977 with the formation of the modern Bashali Chiefdom. The abolition of this chiefdom left the Banyarwanda of Masisi Territory devoid of customary authority, significantly impacting their political representation and contributing to the ongoing struggle for political inclusion of Rwandophone speakers in Masisi Territory.

Following Congo's independence, local tensions flared into conflict between 1963 and 1965 during the local elections, resulting in the Kanyarwanda War. At this time, Kitchanga was primarily inhabited by laborers on the plantations and was a small village serving travelers between Goma and larger centers like Pinga, Mweso, and Birambizo. Despite its modest size, Kitchanga had significant commercial importance due to its strategic location at the junction of several transport routes. The early 1990s saw a resurgence of ethnic conflict in Masisi. Populations identifying as "indigenous," such as Hunde, Nyanga, and Tembo, collided with those they referred to as non-indigenous Rwandophones, predominantly Hutu. Local ethnic militias were formed, and the violent clashes, exacerbated by the weakening of Mobutu Sese Seko's regime, resulted in approximately 10,000 deaths and the displacement of at least 250,000 people. Many Hunde, including Mwami Sylvestre Bashali, fled to Kitchanga, leading to a significant influx of displaced Hunde people into the town.

==== The aftermath of the Rwandan genocide and the First and Second Congo Wars ====
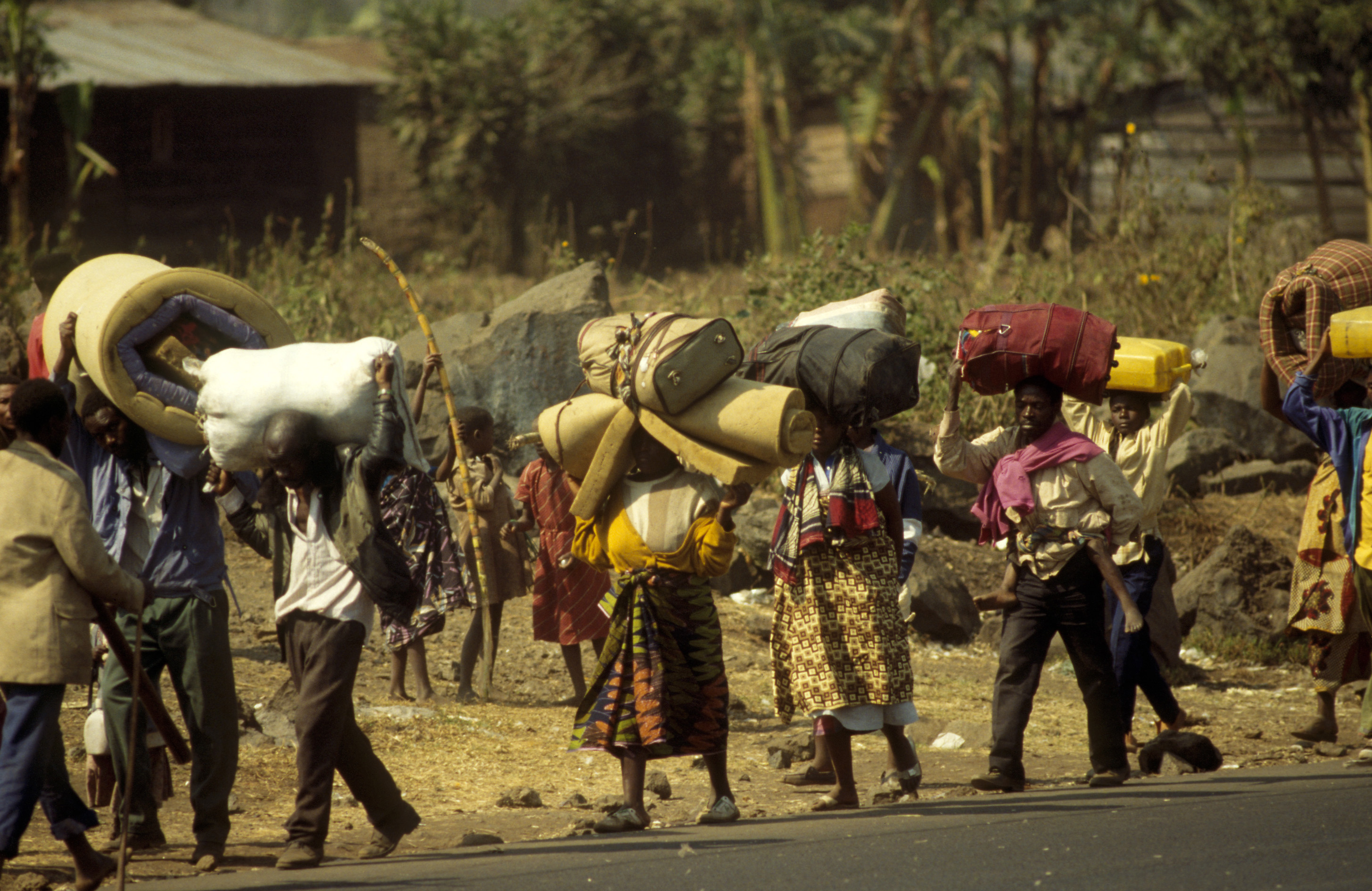
A stream of Rwandan refugees, carrying all their possessions, walks into Goma following the eruption of the Rwandan Civil War

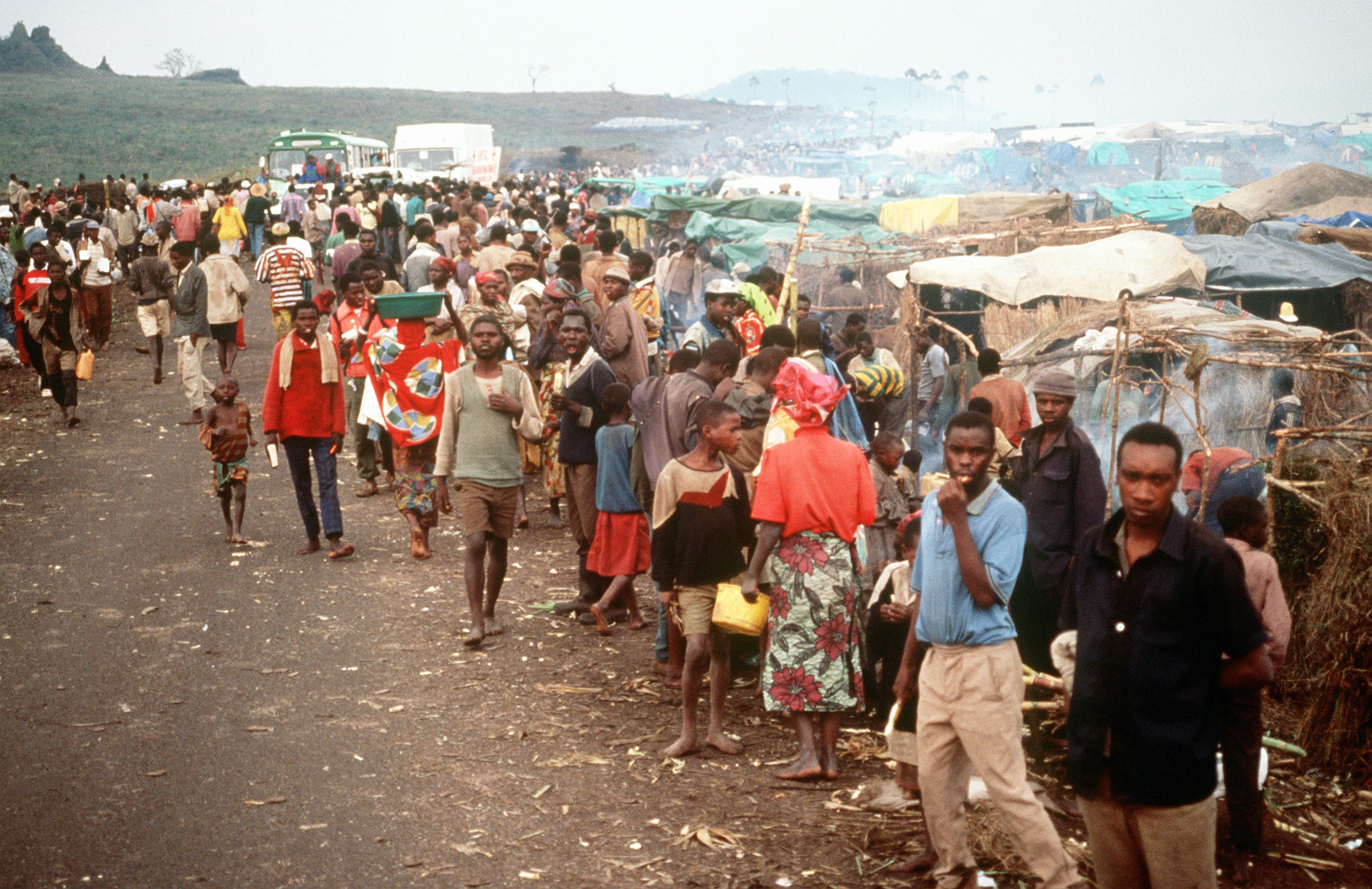
Refugee camp near Goma, Zaire, 1994, providing shelter to those fleeing the Rwandan Civil War.

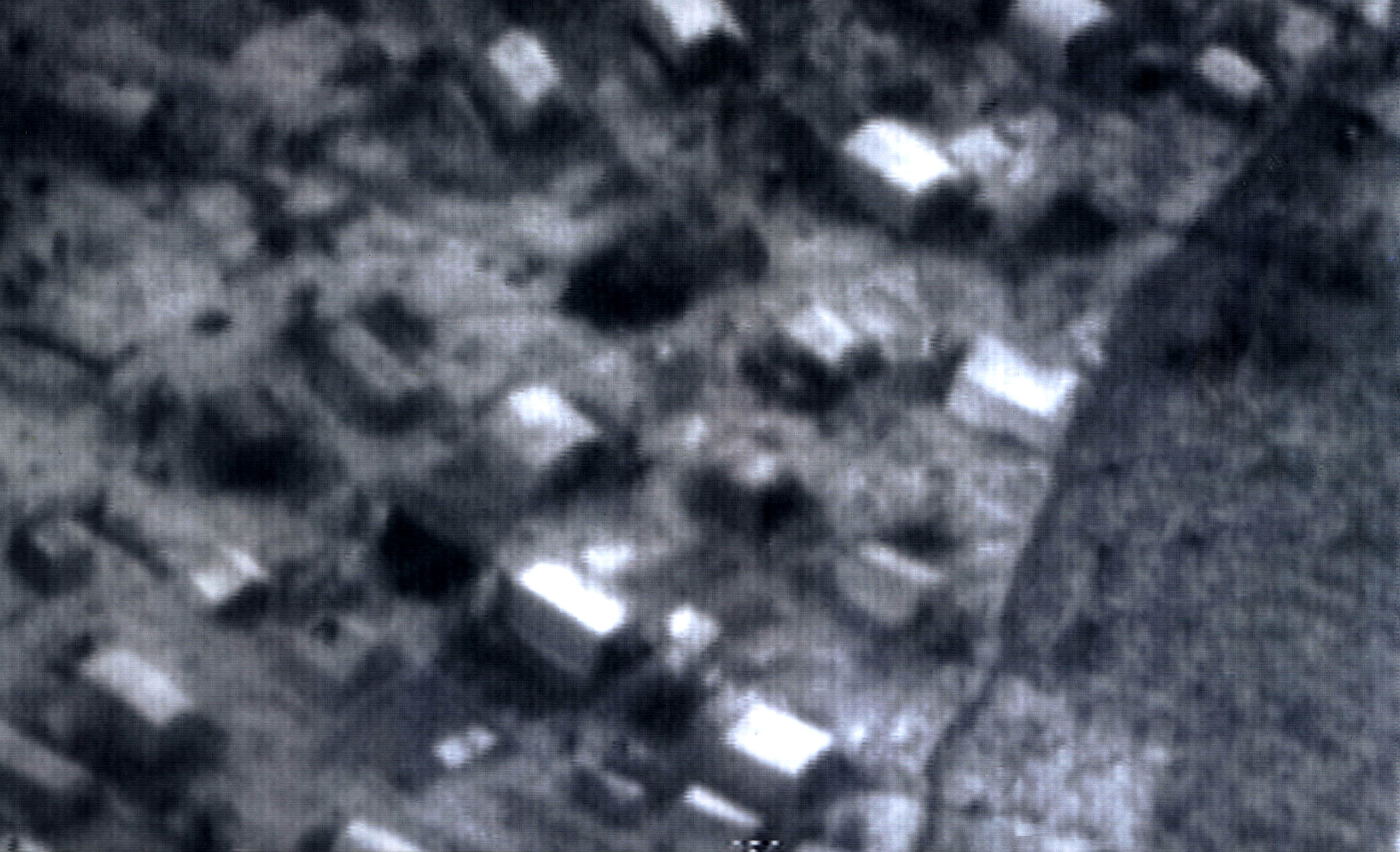
Sake, Zaire refugees in 1996

The 1994 Rwandan genocide and the subsequent influx of Hutu refugees into eastern Zaire further disrupted the region's political landscape. Around 850,000 refugees, including elements of the Forces Armées Rwandaises (FAR) and the Interahamwe, responsible for the genocide, settled in North Kivu.

By the late 1990s, the refugee crisis and local conflicts intensified, culminating in the First Congo War. The Alliance of Democratic Forces for the Liberation of Congo (AFDL), led by Laurent-Désiré Kabila and supported by Rwanda, overthrew Mobutu in 1997. In North Kivu, the rebellion, often perceived as dominated by Tutsi, gave rise to militias that identified as anti-Tutsi forces. The Second Congo War began in 1998, after Laurent-Désiré Kabila attempted to expel his Rwandan allies, leading to the control of eastern Congo by the rebel movement Congolese Rally for Democracy (RCD), which was supported by Rwanda and Uganda. During the RCD era, Kitchanga remained a refuge. The RCD restructured "customary" authority, replacing local leaders with those aligned with the RCD. For instance, the Mwami of Bashali-Mokoto was replaced by Kapenda Muhima, a notable local Hunde aligned with the RCD.

This period saw political and military elites, mainly Rwandophones Congolese, acquiring vast land concessions through semi-legal and often violent means. Kitchanga became an important site for Congolese Tutsi "returnees" from Rwanda and, as such, gained strategic importance in the RCD's "repatriation policy." Most of these "returnees" established themselves around 2002 in Kahe. This elite participation transformed Kitchanga into a major urban center. Kitchanga increasingly became a "place of refuge," attracting displaced people from various ethnic backgrounds.

== Ongoing security problems (2002–present) ==
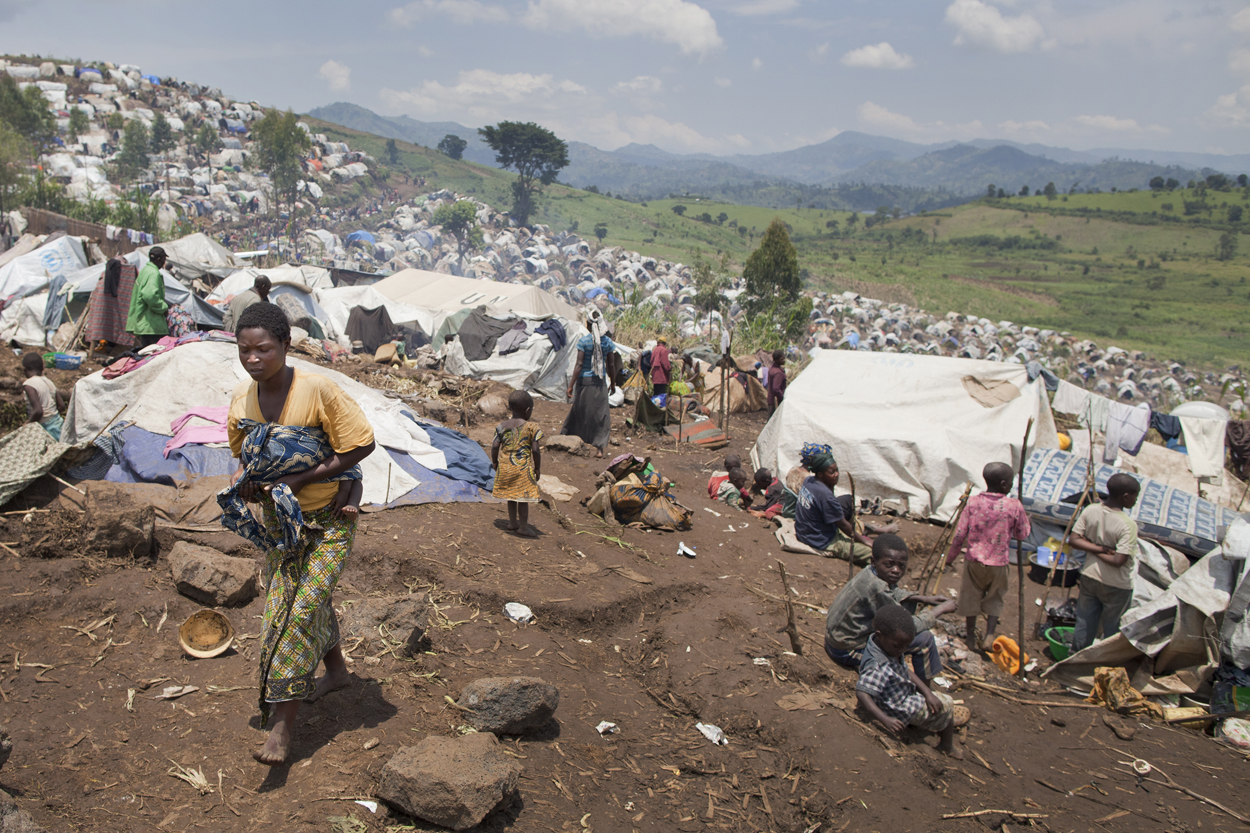
IDP camp around MONUSCO base in Kitchanga, March 2013

Following the 2002 Pretoria Peace Agreement, the RCD underwent a significant transformation, reconfiguring itself as a political party and actively participating in the political process leading up to subsequent elections. RCD members failed to secure seats during the initial elections in 2006, leaving them without representation in provincial and national politics. Disenchanted by the outcome, a faction of discontented members spearheaded by Laurent Nkunda broke away from the RCD and formed the National Congress for the Defense of the People (CNDP), later re-established as M23 to preserve their influence in Kinshasa and safeguard their economic and security prerogatives in the eastern regions.

In November 2012, M23 rebels clashed with the Armed Forces of the Democratic Republic of the Congo (FARDC), subsequently establishing control over extensive swathes of North Kivu, including pivotal areas such as Goma. On November 21, 2012, M23 forces advanced on Sake, securing the Kirolirwe axis en route to Kitchanga. In response, the United Nations Organization Stabilization Mission in the Democratic Republic of the Congo (MONUSCO) deployed "robust patrols" to protect civilians and counter the M23 and Alliance of Patriots for a Free and Sovereign Congo (APCLS) militias towards their base in Kitchanga. This conflict precipitated a mass displacement, with thousands seeking asylum in Kitchanga's Mungote IDP Camp, established amidst the 2007-2009 hostilities involving CNDP, FARDC, and various armed factions. The camp predominantly harbored Congolese Hutu and Tutsi populations.

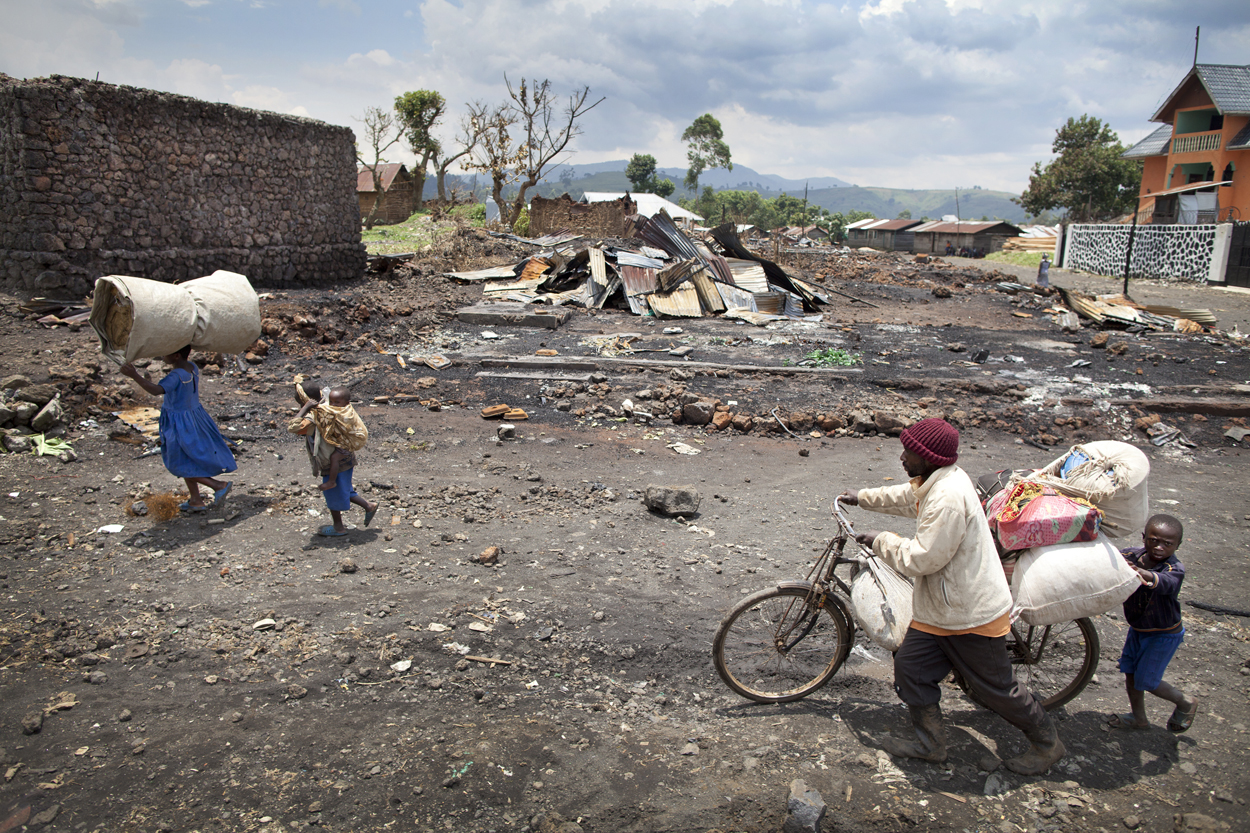
IDPs returned to Kitchanga after heavy fighting between the APCLS militia and the FARDC, March 2013

From February to March 2013, clashes between FARDC and APCLS in Kitchanga resulted in 80 fatalities, numerous injuries, and the displacement of nearly 100,000 people. The APCLS alleged that the government's failed to integrate its fighters into the national army to perpetuate threats from Tutsi rebel factions allegedly supported by Rwanda. Subsequently, the ICRC issued a plea to halt violence against Kitchanga's civilian population. Ban Ki-moon, then UN Secretary-General, urged the UN Security Council to sanction an international intervention brigade. On March 29, 2013, skirmishes between APCLS and FARDC in Kitobo and Muhanga resulted in 17 APCLS militiamen and one FARDC officer perishing, with FARDC forces subsequently expelling the militants from Kitchanga's periphery.

On May 17, 2013, Mai-Mai Nyatura militiamen ousted the Congolese National Police (PNC) from several localities within Kitchanga. A police chief conceded that the force was ill-prepared for armed confrontation. In response, civil society appealed for FARDC to intervene and push out the militias. On May 18, 2013, FARDC dislodged the militias from the Mbuyi and Kashanje hills towards Mwesso and expelled the Mai-Mai Nyatura from Muhongozi, near Kitchanga. The resurgence of APCLS and Mai-Mai Nyatura militias in October 2013 induced widespread displacement, with IDPs congregating in Kitchanga. On January 29, 2014, "unidentified armed bandits" killed four people in Kitchanga, including the national police chief, a farmer, and a teacher. In response, on February 9, 2014, FARDC launched an offensive against the APCLS and Mai-Mai Nyatura in Kibarizo, Muhanga, and Butare, located roughly twenty kilometers west of Kitchanga. During the afternoon, the FARDC dislodged the APCLS from Kibarizo, Muhanga, and Butare in the Masisi Territory.

On August 23, 2016, the APCLS and Mai-Mai Nyatura militias brokered a peace accord in Muhanga, facilitated by local officials and security services, pledging to foster peace and development within the Bashali-Mokoto groupement, which had been a source of contention between them. However, in February 2023, M23 rebels captured Kitchanga after seizing nearby villages, causing the displacement of over 450,000 people. More than 500 people sought refuge at MONUSCO's base in Kitchanga.

== See also ==
- Masisi
- Kishishe massacre
- Makobola massacre
- Kipupu massacre
- Katogota
- Lemera massacre
