= Kalungu =

Kalungu may refer to:

- Kalungu, Democratic Republic of the Congo
- Kalungu, Uganda
- Kalungu District, Uganda
