= Lubwe-Sud bombing =

- Part of M23 campaign and Kivu conflict
- Location: Lubwe-Sud, Bwito Chiefdom, Rutshuru Territory, North Kivu Democratic Republic of the Congo
- Date: July 19, 2023
- Deaths: 9
- Injuries: 16
- Perpetrators: Wazalendo and FARDC (per M23

On July 19, 2023, a bomb exploded in Lubwe-Sud, North Kivu, Democratic Republic of the Congo, killing nine people and injuring sixteen others. The M23 rebels accused the pro-government Wazalendo of perpetrating the bombing.

== Background ==
Lubwe-Sud is located in the Bwito Chiefdom, Rutshuru Territory, North Kivu, in an area that is a flashpoint between the Congolese government and the pro-government Wazalendo militia and the Rwandan-backed M23 rebellion. The Tongo group of villages, which includes Lubwe-Sud, was the scene of fighting between the Wazalendo and M23, killing at least 30 people in the week prior to the bombing.

== Bombing ==
The bombing occurred when a civilian picked up a bomb and handed it off to a local militiaman known as Mzalendo. The area where the civilian picked up the bomb had been mined by both sides due to the recent fighting. When the militiaman took the bomb, he accidentally dropped it and it exploded, maiming everyone around. Two people were killed on the spot, and the rest were rushed to the local hospital.

At least nine people were killed from the bombing, and sixteen more were injured. A spokesman for M23 accused the Congolese Army and M23 of bombing the area. Bertrand Bisimwa, the spokesman, said that Congolese-Wazalendo "shelling" was behind the bombing. A local civil society figure, Patrick Nguka, did not accuse anyone of the bombing but lambasted the Congolese government for not doing enough to help its people.
