= Mukulia =

- Village
- Location within Democratic Republic of the Congo
- Coordinates: 0°27′N 29°26′E
- Country: Democratic Republic of the Congo
- Province: North Kivu
- Time zone: UTC+2 (CAT)

Mukulia is a village in North Kivu in eastern Democratic Republic of the Congo. It is located several kilometres to the south of Beni, connected by the N2 highway.
