= Kanyabayonga =

- Commune
- Commune de Kanyabayonga
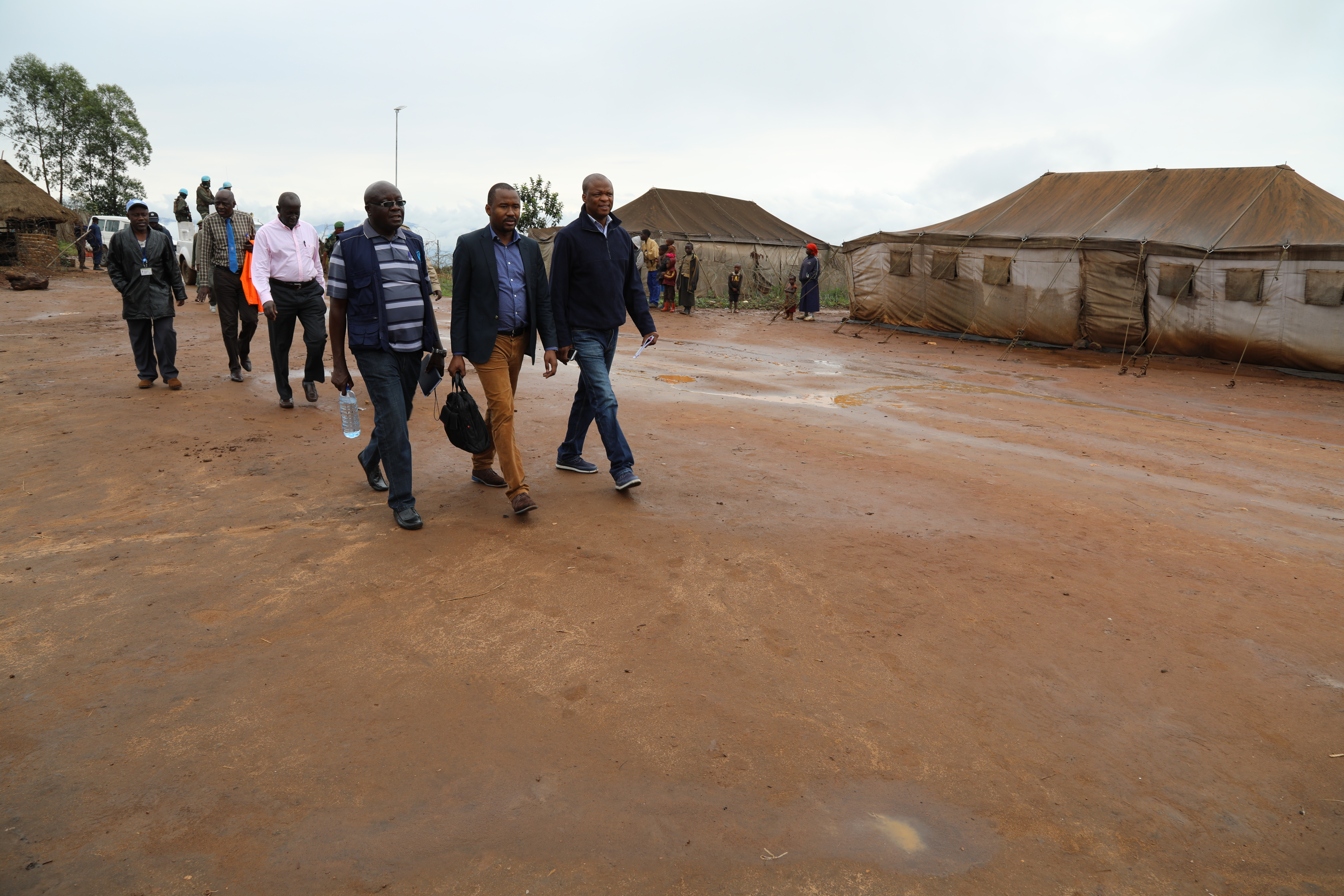
- MONUSCO supports sensitization missions in the camp of Kayanbayonga

- Location within Democratic Republic of the Congo
- Coordinates: 0.7020°S 29.1726°E
- Country: Democratic Republic of Congo
- Province: North Kivu
- Territory: Lubero

Population (2004)
  - Total: 30,000
- Time zone: UTC+2 (CAT)

Kanyabayonga (also Kanya Bayonga, Kanyabayungu) is a town straddling the Lubero and Rutshuru territories of North Kivu province in eastern Democratic Republic of the Congo (DRC). Administratively, the part which is in Lubero is the commune of Kanyabayonga and, the part in Rutshuru belongs to the Kanyabayonga groupement (grouping) which extends well south of the town and is within the Bwito chiefdom. The region as a whole has seen much armed conflict since 1993.

== Location ==
Kanyabayonga lies in mountainous terrain to the west of Lake Edward, in the east of the country. It is on the N2 road from Goma to Butembo. As of 2004 the population was about 30,000.

== Civil wars ==
In 1993 the government's Forces Armées Zaïroises (FAZ) launched "Operation Mbata", a military offensive that resulted in the burning of houses and the central hospital in Kanyabayonga. During the Rwandan Civil War thousands of Rwandan refugees arrived in the region in 1994, fleeing from advancing troops of the Rwandan Patriotic Front. The refugees included Rwandan Armed Forces soldiers and Hutu Interahamwe militias, some of which still occasionally make incursions into Kanyabayonga and surrounding communities, looting, killing and raping.

In the 1996 war led by the Alliance of Democratic Forces for the Liberation of Congo (AFDL) of Laurent-Désiré Kabila, AFDL troops and their allies from Rwanda and Uganda committed many crimes and abuses of human rights in Kanyabayonga. In the Second Congo War initiated by the Rally for Congolese Democracy (RCD) in August 1998, Kanyabayonga suffered further violence and destruction, particularly after the RCD split into two rival groups, the RCD-Goma allied with Rwanda and the RCD-K/ML allied with Uganda. The line between the territories of the two rebel groups was at Rwindi, just south of Kanyabayonga, with Kanyabayonga located in the part controlled by the RCD-K/ML .

In April 2003, the RCD-Goma launched a military offensive against the RCD-K/ML positions, occupying more than two thirds of the Lubero Territory. The advance was halted after signature of an agreement in Bujumbura on 19 June 2003 under which the RCD-Goma had to withdraw to their former territory. However Armée Nationale Congolaise (ANC) troops, the armed forces of the RCD-Goma, continued to occupy Kanyabayonga along with local mostly Hutu militias created and directed by the North Kivu Governor Eugene Serufuli. On 10 and 11 October 2004, hundreds of mostly young students from primary and secondary schools took to the streets of the city of Kanyabayonga to protest against the increase in crimes against civilians by these forces. ANC troops violently broke up the demonstration and instituted a reign of terror.

== Ongoing violence ==
In October and November 2008 there was widespread fighting in North Kivu between the Congolese-Tutsi rebel Congrès National pour la Défense du Peuple (CNDP) and the Armed Forces of the Democratic Republic of the Congo (FARDC), who were supported by local Mayi Mayi militias and the Rwandan-Hutu Democratic Forces for the Liberation of Rwanda (FDLR) militia. The CNDP launched attacks south towards Goma and north towards Rutshuru. The FARDC troops retreated south through Goma towards South Kivu and north through Kanyabayonga into Lubero Territory. At least five FARDC brigades poured into Lubero Territory. Many civilians fled into the bush to avoid the troops. During the withdrawal through Kanyabayonga the soldiers shot several civilians, raped at least fifty women and looted houses for food, basic household and agricultural items and mobile telephones. As of September 2009, many of there soldiers remained in the area.

In November 2010 Christian Bakulene, Pastor of the Parish of Saint Jean-Baptiste in Kanyabayonga, was murdered by two armed men in military uniform. The local press speculated that the killing was meant to intimidate other priests working in the area. In May 2011 both the northern and southern areas of the densely populated Lubero territory were under control of the FDLR and Mayi-Mayi militia. The town was undefended and was subject to persistent attacks and looting by these forces. On 9–10 June 2011, FDLR rebels burned over 100 houses in Kanyabayonga. Although there were UN and Congolese army troops in the area, they did not protect the civilians.
