= Kalungu, Democratic Republic of the Congo =

Town in the South Kivu Province of the Democratic Republic of the Congo

Kalungu
- Commune
- Location within Democratic Republic of the Congo
- Coordinates: 1.757°S 28.985°E
- Country: Democratic Republic of the Congo
- Province: South Kivu
- Territory: Kahele

Kalungu is a town in Kalehe Territory, South Kivu province of the Democratic Republic of the Congo (DRC). The town is located between Lake Kivu and the surrounding mountains.

In 2025, M23 rebels took over the town, causing a substantial portion of the local population to evacuate.

Coffee is one of the crops grown around Kalungu.

Kalungu is a local business center, located on the Goma-Bukavu highway.

A recent war, waged by Nkunda and Mutebutsi, destroyed Kalungu center and caused its people to flee to neighboring villages like Bwisha, Mpumbi, Makelele Nyamasasa, Ruhunde, and Nyakalende on the shores of Lake Kivu.

The main language spoken in Kalungu is Kihavu followed by Kiswahili and Kitembo as well as French.
