= National Road 2 (Democratic Republic of the Congo) =

Road in the Democratic Republic of the Congo

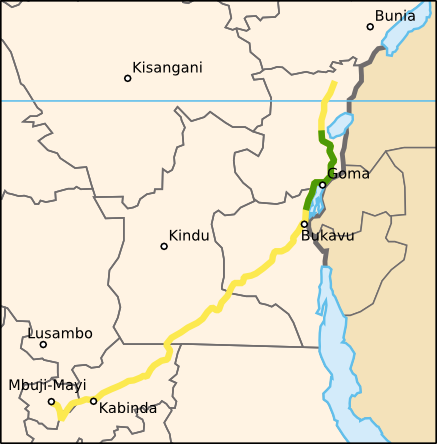

Route information
- Length: 1,404.2 km (872.5 mi)

Major junctions
- South-west end: N1 in Mbuji-Mayi
- N31 in Kasongo; N5 in Bukavu; N3 in Bukavu
- North-east end: N4 in Beni

Location
- Country: Democratic Republic of the Congo

Highway system
- Transport in the Democratic Republic of the Congo

National Road No. 2 is a road in the Democratic Republic of the Congo. It runs from Mbuji-Mayi through Bukavu, Goma, and terminates at Beni.

In the north, the road runs along the western edge of Virunga National Park until it reaches Kanyabayonga, where it cuts through the park to Rutshuru and then south to Goma, which lies on the northern shore of Lake Kivu around the western shore of Lake Kivu via Katana towards Bukavu. The condition of the road in North Kivu is passable, but from Bukavu to Kitutu, the condition of the road is very poor.

Towns linked (north to south)
Town	Province
Beni	North Kivu
Mukulia	North Kivu
Butembo	North Kivu
Lubero	North Kivu
Kanyabayonga	North Kivu
Rwindi	North Kivu
Rutshuru	North Kivu
Goma	North Kivu
Sake	North Kivu
Bweremana	South Kivu
Minova	South Kivu
Kalungu	South Kivu
Kavumu	South Kivu
Bukavu	South Kivu
Kitutu	South Kivu
Kamituga	South Kivu
Kasongo	Maniema
Lubao	Lomami
Kabinda	Lomami
Mbuji-Mayi	Kasaï-Oriental

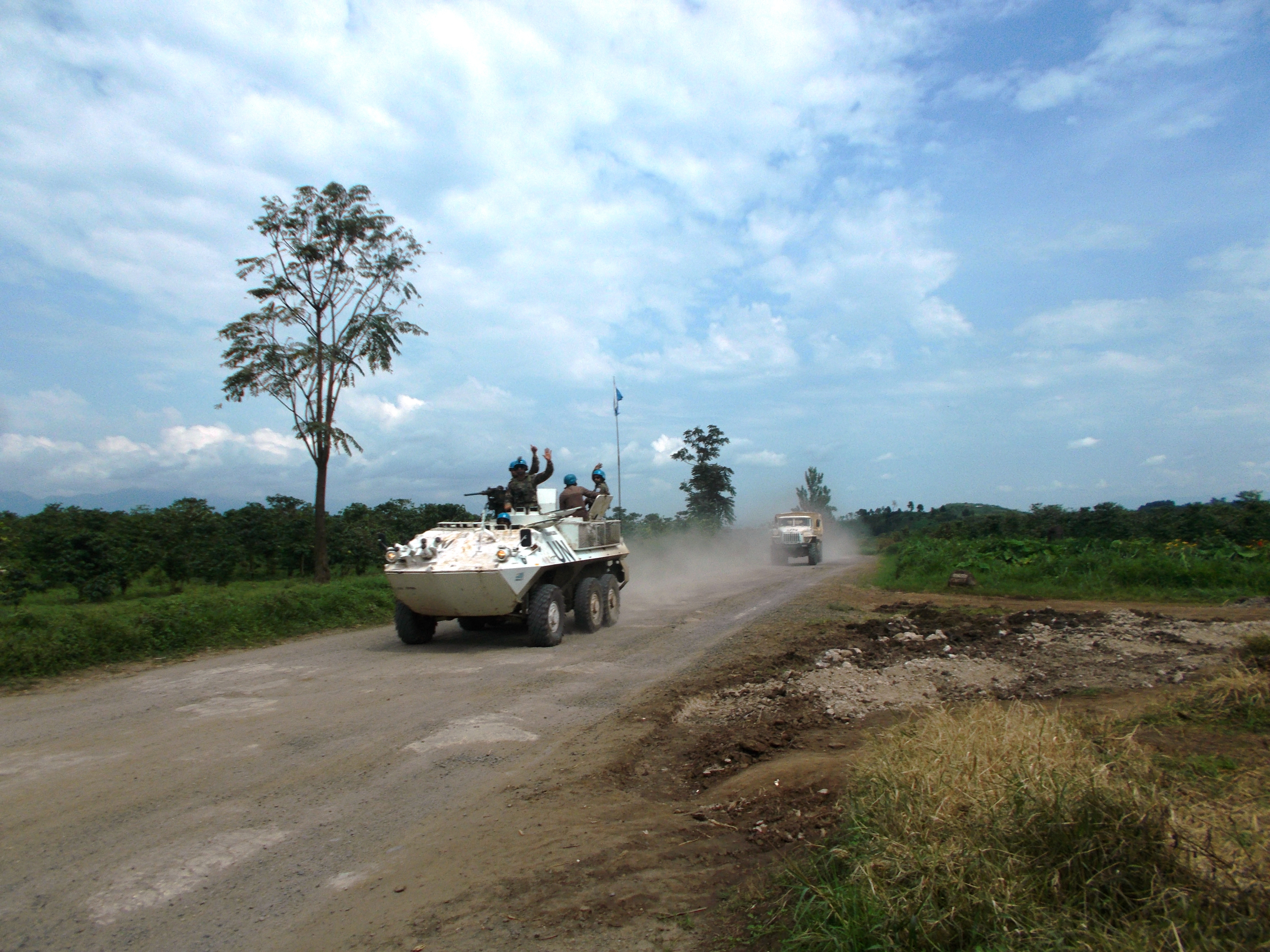
MONUSCO peacekeepers driving on N2 near Kanyabayonga in North Kivu.

== See also ==
- Transport in the Democratic Republic of the Congo
