= Radio Okapi =

Congolese Radio Network

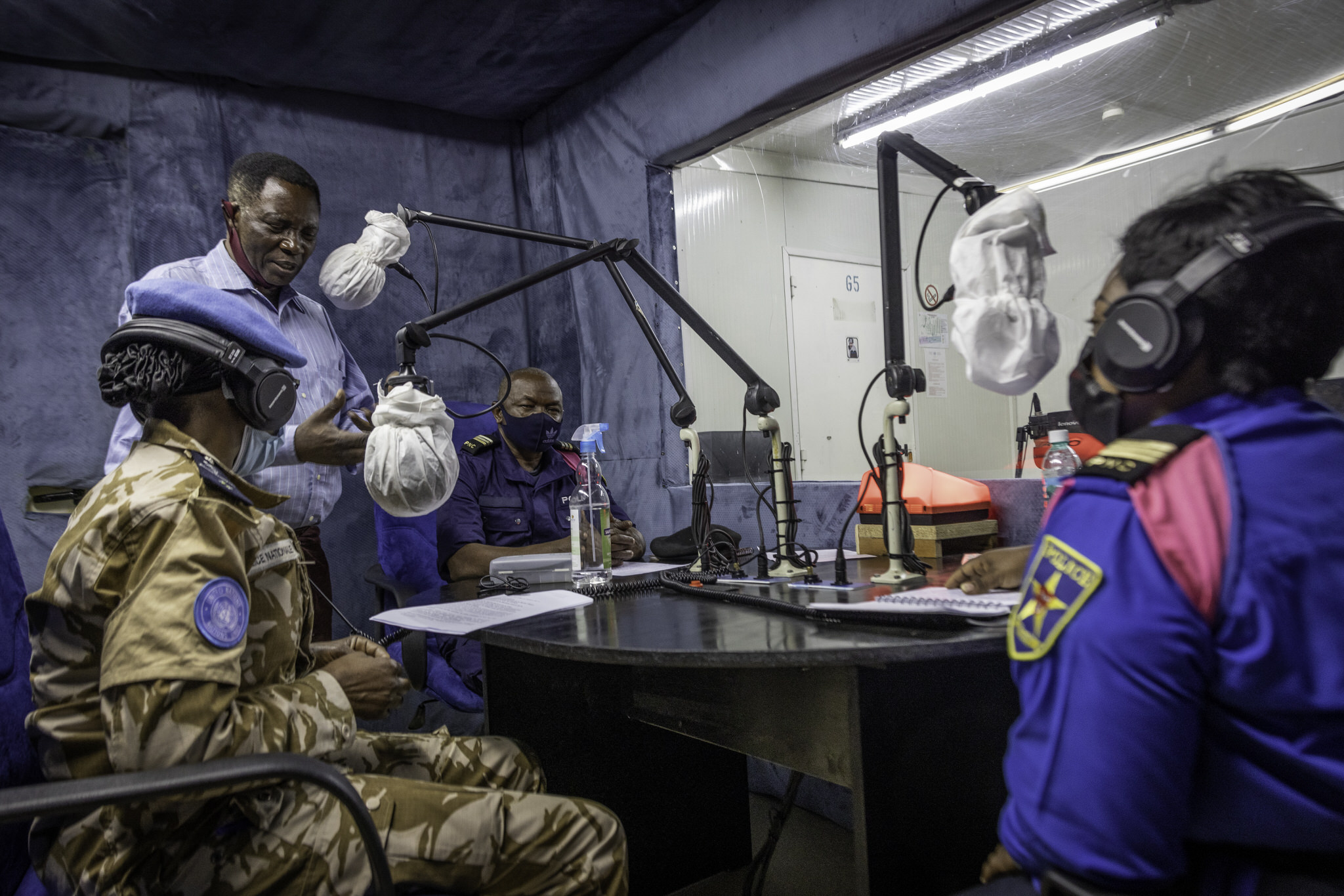
MONUSCO police officers in Goma participated in a broadcast about sexual and gender-based violence in 2021

Radio Okapi is a radio network that operates in the Democratic Republic of the Congo. On an annual budget of USD4.5 million, a staff of 200 provide news and information to the entire urban population of the DRC. Radio Okapi provides programming in French and in the four national languages of Congo: Lingala, Kituba, Swahili and Tshiluba.

== History ==
Radio Okapi was created by the United Nations Mission in the Democratic Republic of Congo (MONUC) and the Swiss NGO Fondation Hirondelle. The agreement between MONUC and the Congolese government foresaw the creation of a radio network to inform the Congolese population of the MONUC's efforts. MONUC and the Fondation Hirondelle submitted a plan in 2001 to the United Nations, and the radio network went live on 25 February 2002. The station takes its name from the endangered okapi, the elusive mammal native to the rainforest of northern Congo.

In 2011 The Economist said that Radio Okapi was "one of Africa’s most admirably independent radio services".

Mary Myers, in the essay "Well-Informed Journalists Make Well-Informed Citizens: Coverage of Governance Issues in the Democratic Republic of Congo," said that the radio station "raised the bar for other indigenous radio and TV stations in the country." Other area radio stations copied Radio Okapi's news gathering techniques, program concepts, and formats. Myers also said "Although Radio Okapi can be a thorn in the government's side at times, its stance of promoting peace and democracy and the strong role it plays in civic education have led to its recognition, even by the Minister of Information, as a national asset that the Democratic Republic of Congo could ill afford to lose."

On 13 June 2007, the station’s editor in chief for Bukavu, Serge Maheshe, was shot dead.

== Transmitters ==
Radio Okapi provides programming in French and in Lingala, Kituba, Swahili and Tshiluba, transmitting all day every day on:

- Kinshasa 103.5 MHz
- Aru 88.0 MHz
- Bandundu 99.0 MHz
- Baraka 103.4 MHz
- Béni 92.0 MHz
- Bukavu 95.3 MHz
- Bunia 104.9 MHz
- Bunyakiri 103.2 MHz
- Butembo 92.9 MHz
- Dungu 103.4 MHz
- Gbadolite 93.0 MHz
- Gemena 95.4 MHz
- Goma 105.2 MHz
- Isiro 90.1 MHz
- Kalemie 105.0 MHz
- Kamina 104.3 MHz
- Kananga 93.0 MHz
- Kanyabayonga 96.0 MHz
- Kikwit 103.5 MHz
- Kindu 103.0 MHz
- Kisangani 94.8 MHz
- Lisala 104.3 MHz
- Lubumbashi 95.8 MHz
- Mahagi 96.0 MHz
- Manono 104.5 MHz
- Masisi 96.0 MHz
- Matadi 102.0 MHz
- Mbandaka 103.0 MHz
- Mbuji-Mayi 103.5 MHz
- Moba 102.4 MHz
- Rutshuru 95.3 MHz
- Tshomo Uni 106.5 MHz
- Uvira 105.3 MHz
- Walikale 104.9 MHz
- Shortwave
  - 9635 kHz (5 AM to 7 AM)
  - 11690 kHz (5 PM to 6 PM)

== Sources ==
- "Fondation Hirondelle, Media for Peace and Human Dignity". Fondation Hirondelle.

== In film ==
- Radio Okapi, radio de la vie, is a documentary produced by Pierre Guyot, 2006. It premiered on TV5 in June 2006. It examines the work of Breuil Munganga, a journalist at Radio Okapi. It has been selected by many festivals in France, Canada, Central African Republic and Burkina Faso.

== See also ==
- Radios en République démocratique du Congo (in French)
