= Kipupu massacre =

Massacre in the Democratic Republic of the Congo

- Part of the Kivu conflict
- Kipupu massacre (Democratic Republic of the Congo)
- Location: 3°38′24″S 28°42′0″E; Kipupu, South Kivu, DR Congo
- Date: 16 July 2020; 6 years ago
- Attack type: Massacre, ethnic cleansing, arson, war rape
- Deaths: 220 (provincial deputy claim); 18 (analyst claim)
- Victims: Bembe, Fuliiru, and Nyindu peoples
- Perpetrators: Ngumino and Twiganeho militias
- Motive: Allegations that Kipupu was a CNPSC stronghold, ethnic violence

The Kipupu massacre (French: massacre de Kipupu) occurred on 16 July 2020 in the South Kivu village of Kipupu in the Mwenga Territory in the eastern Democratic Republic of the Congo. Gunmen belonging to the Ngumino and Twiganeho militias of the Banyamulenge community attacked the village and reportedly killed 220 people according to provincial lawmakers, while independent analysts state only 18 people were killed.

The massacre resulted in widespread outrage from the communities targeted, as well as from Congolese politicians, including Martin Fayulu.

== Background ==
Clashes between militias loyal to the National Coalition of the People for the Sovereignty of Congo (CNPSC) Mai-Mai coalition and Banyamulenge militias have been ongoing since 2019, but have intensified as of mid-2020. The fighting is born out of both community conflict and the objective of expelling the Banyamulenge armed groups from the country by the CNPSC. Those on the side of the CNPSC believe the Banyamulenge to be Tutsi from Rwanda, and see the Ngumino and Twiganeho militias as another Rwandan-backed rebellion similar to the March 23 Movement (M23). Those on the side of the Banyamulenge militias believe they are using self-defense groups to protect themselves from an enemy that wishes to exterminate them.

== Attack ==
The attack took place in and around Kipupu village. According to provincial officials, the militias set fire to houses and stole livestock while marching towards the village. The militias briefly clashed with Mai-Mai forces as well, with more civilians being killed in the crossfire. Following this, the Ngumino and Twiganeho continued to the village, where they burned houses, stole cattle, and raped women. This also coincided with machete attacks as well as shootings of civilians. 220 people were killed in the attack, according to provincial deputies. According to Kivu Security Tracker, an analyst group, the death toll was 18 as opposed to 220.

== Aftermath ==
The attack sparked outrage among the Congolese populace as well as prominent opposition politicians. Around thirty elected officials from South Kivu called upon the Congolese government and the Armed Forces of the Democratic Republic of the Congo (FARDC) to increase their efforts to protect civilians in the region. The officials also called on MONUSCO, the local United Nations mission, to do the same. On 26 July, community leaders from the ethnic groups targeted released a statement condemning MONUSCO and the FARDC for not doing enough to prevent the massacre. The same day, Denis Mukwege, a prominent Congolese doctor, condemned the attacks in a statement on Twitter. In another statement released on 31 July, he claimed to have received hate mail and threats towards himself and his family after condemning the massacre. On 27 July, prominent opposition politician Martin Fayulu released a statement condemning the massacre and calling for an international investigation.

Some Banyamulenge activists claimed the massacre did not happen or that the death toll was not as high as reported. The Mahoro Peace Association, a Banyamulenge activist group, has both denied the massacre, as well as having attempted to shift blame to the CNPSC by discussing their alleged attacks on Banyamulenge civilians. Notably, the organization's president, Adele Kibasumba Ndaba, claimed the massacre was fake in a Twitter video.

== See also ==
- 2020 Democratic Republic of the Congo attacks
- List of massacres in the Democratic Republic of the Congo
