= Rwindi =

Town in North Kivu Province

Coordinates: 0.787°S 29.288°E

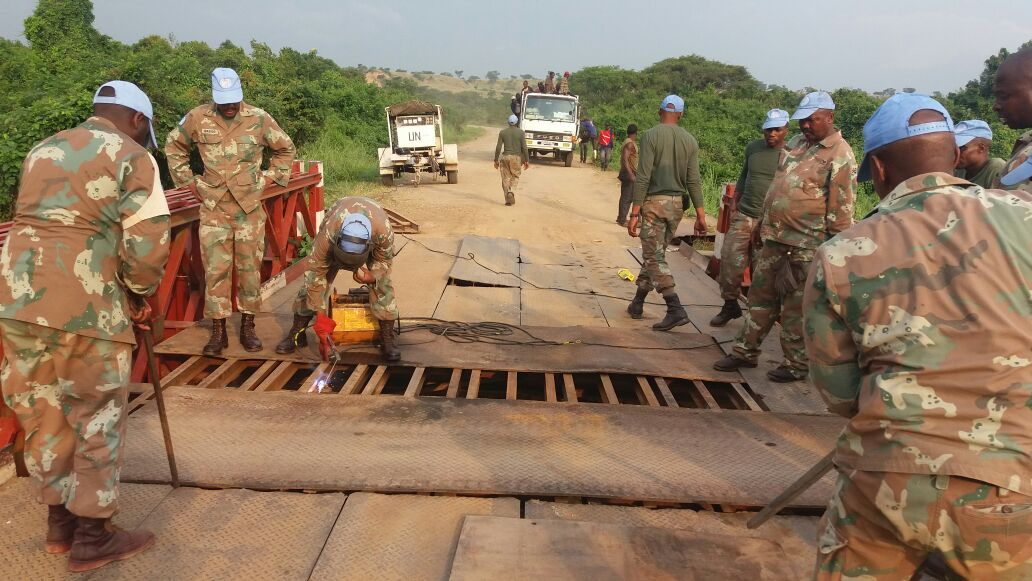
During the rehabilitation of the Baily Bridge in Rwindi

Rwindi is a town in Rutshuru Territory, North Kivu Province, Democratic Republic of the Congo. It has an airport located at an altitude of 1,040 m (3,410 ft), the Rwindi Airport.

Rwindi is located within Virunga National Park along the N2 road, and there is also another road formerly used by Somikivu to access to the Lueshe mine 40 km to the south.

On 8 March 2024 the town was captured by March 23 Movement rebels.
