= Karuba, Democratic Republic of the Congo =

Karuba
- Location in Democratic Republic of the Congo
- Coordinates: 1°35′S 28°59′E
- Country: Democratic Republic of the Congo
- Province: North Kivu
- Territory: Masisi Territory
- Time zone: UTC+2 (CAT)

Karuba is a village in Nord-Kivu, Democratic Republic of the Congo. In September and October 2007, it was the scene of fighting between the forces of rebel general Laurent Nkunda and the army of the Democratic Republic of the Congo. The Congolese army claimed to be in control of Karuba as of October 10, 2007.
