= Masisi Territory =

Territory in North Kivu, DR Congo

Masisi Territory Wilaya ya Masisi (Swahili)
- Territory
- Territoire de Masisi
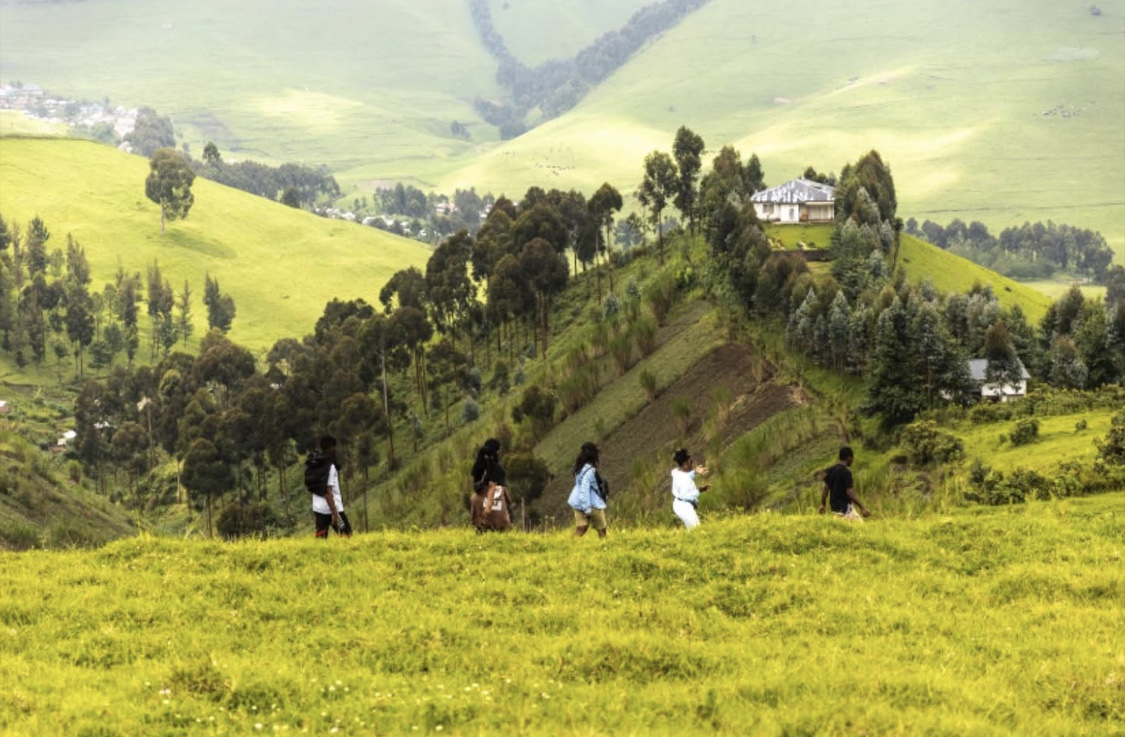
- View of Masisi Territory
- Masisi on a map of North Kivu Province
- Location in DR Congo
- Coordinates: 1°24′S 28°48′E
- Country: DR Congo
- Province: North Kivu

Area
  - Total: 4,734 km^{2} (1,828 sq mi)

Population (2020)
  - Total: 843,396
  - Density: 178.2/km^{2} (461.4/sq mi)
- Time zone: UTC+2 (CAT)

Masisi Territory is a territory located in the North Kivu province of the Democratic Republic of the Congo. Its political headquarters are located in the town of Masisi. Covering an area of 4,734 square kilometers and with a population estimate of 843,396 as of 2020, it is bordered to the north by the Walikale Territory, to the south by Lake Kivu and the South Kivu, to the east by Nyiragongo Territory and Rutshuru Territory, as well as the communes of Goma and Karisimbi, to the west by Kalehe Territory and Walikale Territory. Masisi Territory is administratively divided into two chiefdoms: Bashali and Bahunde, as well as two sectors, Katoyi and Osso-Banyungu, and the commune of Masako.

The territory was established on 15 March 1935 at Bution, within the Waloa-Yangu groupement. Until 1954, Walikale Territory formed part of Masisi Territory. Later administrative reforms led to the formal establishment in December 1977 of Bashali Chiefdom, Bahunde Chiefdom, the Osso-Banyungu sector, and the Katoyi sector. The territory is inhabited by several ethnic groups, including the Bahunde, Batembo, Bakumu, Bahutu, Batutsi, and Batwa. Population movements and demographic shifts, combined with disputes related to land tenure, political representation, and ethnic identity, have played an important role in shaping the territory's history and politics. Masisi Territory has also been a major center of armed conflict in eastern Congo, particularly during and after the Congo Wars (1996–2003). Numerous armed factions, ethnic militias, and foreign-backed groups have operated in the territory, one of the most contested areas of North Kivu. The economy is predominantly based on agriculture, livestock farming, fishing, tourism, and mineral exploitation.

== Geography ==
=== Relief, soil, and subsoil ===
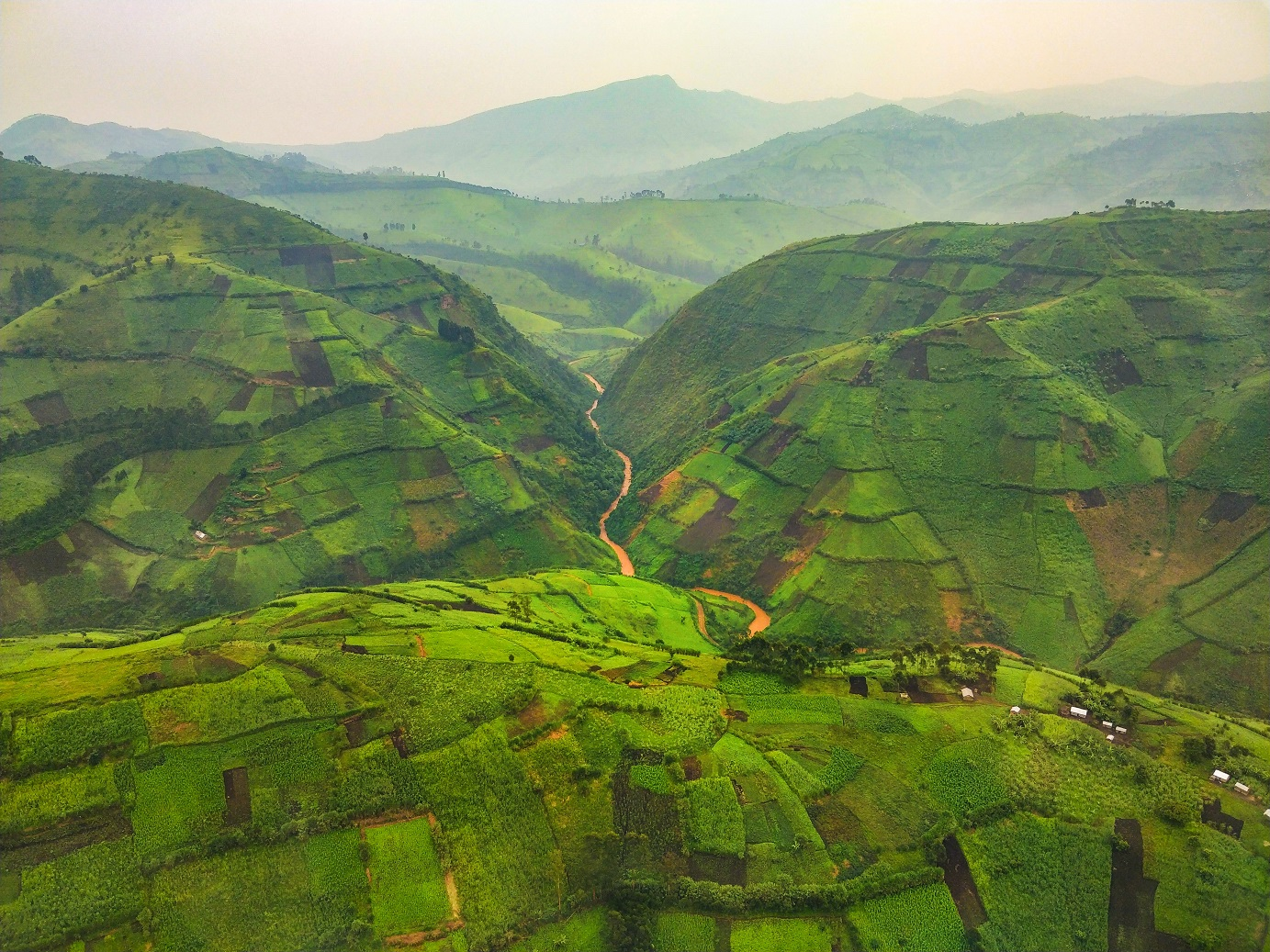
Skyview of Masisi Territory landscape

Masisi Territory is known for its rugged terrain, composed of steppes and oasis-like landscapes, characterized by mountains, hills, plateaus, and plains. The fertile volcanic soil, which is rich in humus, supports agriculture. Clay soils dominate the territory and cover roughly three-quarters of the land, especially in the central and southern regions. Sandy soils, which account for about one-quarter of the area, are mainly located in the northeastern zone, including Kilolirwe, Kitshanga, and parts of Sake. The subsoil contains valuable minerals such as tourmaline, columbite-tantalite, and cassiterite.

=== Hydrography ===
The area's hydrography includes numerous lakes and rivers. Notable small lakes in Bashali Chiefdom include Mokoto, Ndalaa, Lukulu, Mbita, and Mbalukira. Lake Kivu lies in Bahunde Chiefdom in the southwestern part of the territory. Rivers of interest include the Chungiri River, which forms a boundary with Kalehe Territory, and the Nganjo River, which separates the Bashali Chiefdom and Bahunde Chiefdom. Other rivers include the Kamurontsa River, as well as the Mweso and Luholu rivers in the north; the Osso, Luhola, Mbiti, Mweso, and Luashi rivers in the east; and the Luhashi, Osso, and Mbiti rivers in the south. Additional waterways include the Mutiri, Reng, and Kyambiringa rivers. Many of these rivers derive their names from the villages or localities through which they pass.

=== Climate ===
Masisi Territory has a tropical climate that is largely influenced by its mountainous relief and variations in altitude. The territory experiences a prolonged rainy season from about 15 August to 15 June, followed by a relatively brief dry season from 15 June to 15 August. Average temperatures decrease with altitude, reaching 23°C at 100 m above sea level, about 20°C at 1,400 m, 17°C at 1,800 m, and around 15°C at 2,000 m. Climatically, the territory is commonly divided into three zones: the high-altitude zone (1000–2700 m) including areas like Kibabi, Matanda, Mihanga, and Ngungu; the low-altitude zone (1700–3000 m) including Karisimbi, Nyange, and Mweso; and the region along Lake Kivu, which has a unique microclimate.

=== Administration and governance ===
Masisi Territory was created on 15 March 1935 at Bution, within the Waloa-Yangu groupement, which at that time belonged to the same administrative entity. Prior to 1954, the Walikale Territory was part of the Masisi Territory. Administrative adjustments over the years eventually led to December 1977, when Bashali Chiefdom, Bahunde Chiefdom, Osso-Banyungu sector, and Katoyi sector were officially established.

Administratively, Masisi Territory is divided into two chiefdoms, Bashali and Bahunde, and two sectors, Katoyi and Osso-Banyungu. The territory also has one rural commune Masako, with fewer than 80,000 voters. Chiefdoms and sectors are further subdivided into groupements (groupings) and localités (villages) in accordance with Ordinance Law No. 82-006 of 25 February 1982, which governs the territory's political and administrative structure. Each chiefdom and sector is led by a traditional chief, known as a mwami, who oversees customary authority, manages succession, and preserves local traditions. While these chiefs cooperate with the Territorial Administrator, they retain a certain degree of autonomy in their internal governance.

At the mid-level, each groupement is managed by a chef de groupement, usually chosen from the royal lineage. Their official appointment is confirmed by the Minister of the Interior and Security, Decentralization, and Customary Affairs, and the installation ceremony is conducted by the Territorial Administrator or Mayor with the presence of the mwami of the chiefdom or sector. At the local level, village chiefs (chefs de village) are responsible for administrative tasks including conducting population censuses, monitoring public health, and managing civil registration such as birth, death, and marriage records. They are officially recognized by the Territorial Administrator and installed by the chef de groupement with the mwami present. In incorporated groupements, however, this recognition is granted by the Mayor. Village chiefs report administratively to their respective chef de groupement.

- Masisi Territory
  - Bahunde Chiefdom
    - Kamuronza
    - Mupfuni-Karuba
    - Mupfuni-Kibabi
    - Mupfuni-Matanda
    - Mupfuni-Shanga
    - Ufamando I
  - Bashali Chiefdom
    - Bashali-Mokoto
    - Bashali-Kaembe
  - Katoyi Sector
    - Kambule
    - Kibabi II
    - Lwindi
    - Nyalipe
    - Nyamaboko II
    - Ufamando II
  - Osso-Banyungu Sector
    - Bapfuna
    - Banyungu
    - Biiri
    - Buabo
    - Nyamaboko I

Source: Independent National Electoral Commission.

Each chiefdom or sector operates through two main governing structures: the Council and the Executive College. The Council serves as the deliberative body, with councillors elected through direct, secret, and universal suffrage in accordance with national electoral legislation. Councillors receive adequate remuneration to maintain their independence and dignity. The Council is led by an elected Bureau that consists of a President, vice-president, and Rapporteur, and internal regulations ensure leadership elections and gender representation where applicable.

The Executive College manages the chiefdom's or sector's affairs and enforces Council decisions. It includes the mwami and three Aldermen, selected based on competence, credibility, and community representation, whose appointments must be approved by the Council. Although the mwami does not answer directly to the Council, all decisions require the co-signature of an Alderman, who assumes full accountability before the Council. If the mwami dies, resigns, becomes incapacitated, or is legally disqualified, the Aldermen collectively administer the territory until a new mwami is appointed, with the presiding Alderman serving as interim leader during temporary absences.

== Demographics ==
=== Population ===
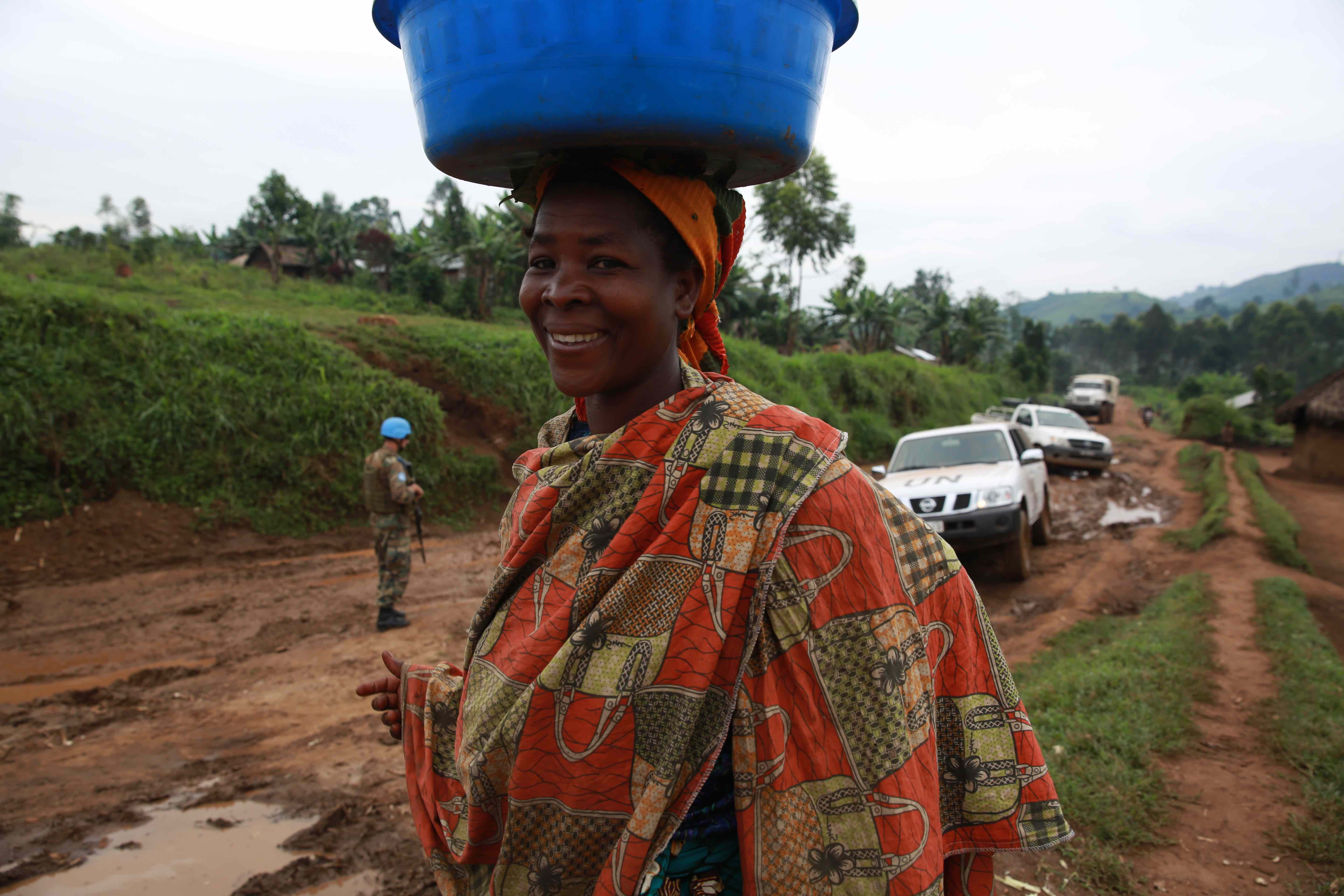
A woman smiles as a MONUSCO ground patrol passes along the Nyanzale–Kitshanga road in Masisi Territory

Masisi Territory is inhabited by six principal ethnic groups: Bahutu (50%), Bahunde (20%), Batembo (10%), Batutsi (10%), Bakumu (5%), and Batwa (5%). The Hunde are the territory's indigenous people who descended from Bantu migrations, and their livelihoods include agriculture, fishing, hunting, small-scale livestock farming, and trade. They live throughout the territory but are more concentrated in the south. The Batembo live in the south of the territory and also rely on farming, hunting, fishing, and small-scale livestock farming. The Batwa, a Pygmy population scattered across the territory, generally adopt the language of the communities around them and maintain a traditional lifestyle based on hunting and gathering. The majority presence of Hutu and Tutsi communities results from Belgian-organized migrations between 1937 and 1954, and from movements under Rwanda's Juvénal Habyarimana regime. The Hutu live in the northern and central parts of the territory and are mainly involved in agriculture, livestock farming, and trade, whereas the Tutsi live mostly in the eastern and southern parts of the territory and primarily focus on raising livestock. In terms of language, French serves as the Democratic Republic of the Congo's administrative language. Swahili is spoken by the majority (56%), while Kihunde is used by 20% of the population and Kinyarwanda by 15%. Small numbers speak Kitembo (2%), who migrated from Lubero and Beni Territories, and Kinande (2%), particularly in the southern Ufamando groupements.

According to a population census carried out in 2006, Masisi Territory had a total population of 607,547 people. The census data, compiled by the territory's civil registry services, indicate that Bahunde Chiefdom was the most populous administrative unit, with 254,227 residents. This demographic predominance is largely attributed to the presence of multiple indigenous groups as well as considerable numbers of migrants, including populations of Rwandan origin who had settled in the area over time. Bashali Chiefdom ranked as the second most populated area, followed by the Osso–Banyungu sector, both of which had large rural populations mainly engaged in agriculture and pastoralism. The Masisi town, the territorial administrative center, recorded the smallest population, with 5,742 residents. This relatively low figure reflects the impact of insecurity and population displacement during periods of conflict, which forced many families to move to nearby rural areas or relocate to the provincial capital, Goma. The Katoyi sector remained less densely populated. Historically inhabited mainly by the Tembo, its demographic growth was limited until migration movements that followed the eruption of Mount Nyiragongo, which encouraged new settlement in parts of the territory.

By 2020, the population of Masisi Territory had increased significantly, reaching an estimated 843,396 people.

=== Health ===
The territory is served by three referral hospitals located in Masisi, Kirotshe, and Mweso, as well as four health zones (zones de santé): Masisi, Kirotshe, Mweso, and Katoyi. Of these, three health zones (Masisi, Kirotshe, and Mweso) are currently operational and include a network of 79 health centers. Several of these facilities receive support from international partners, notably Médecins Sans Frontières (MSF) Belgium at Masisi Referral Hospital (Hôpital de référence de Masisi), MSF Holland at Mweso Referral Hospital (Hôpital référence de Mweso), and the Université libre de Bruxelles at Kirotshe Referral Hospital (Hôpital de référence de Kirotshe).

=== Education ===
All groupements in the territory are served by educational institutions, with each having roughly 30 primary schools and 18 secondary schools. Primary and secondary schools located in urban areas generally offer better-quality education. Masisi Territory also has six universities and 13 higher institutes (Instituts supérieurs). However, most of these higher institutes and some universities lack their own buildings, although they typically own plots of land of about two hectares.

== History ==
=== Early history and East African slave trade ===
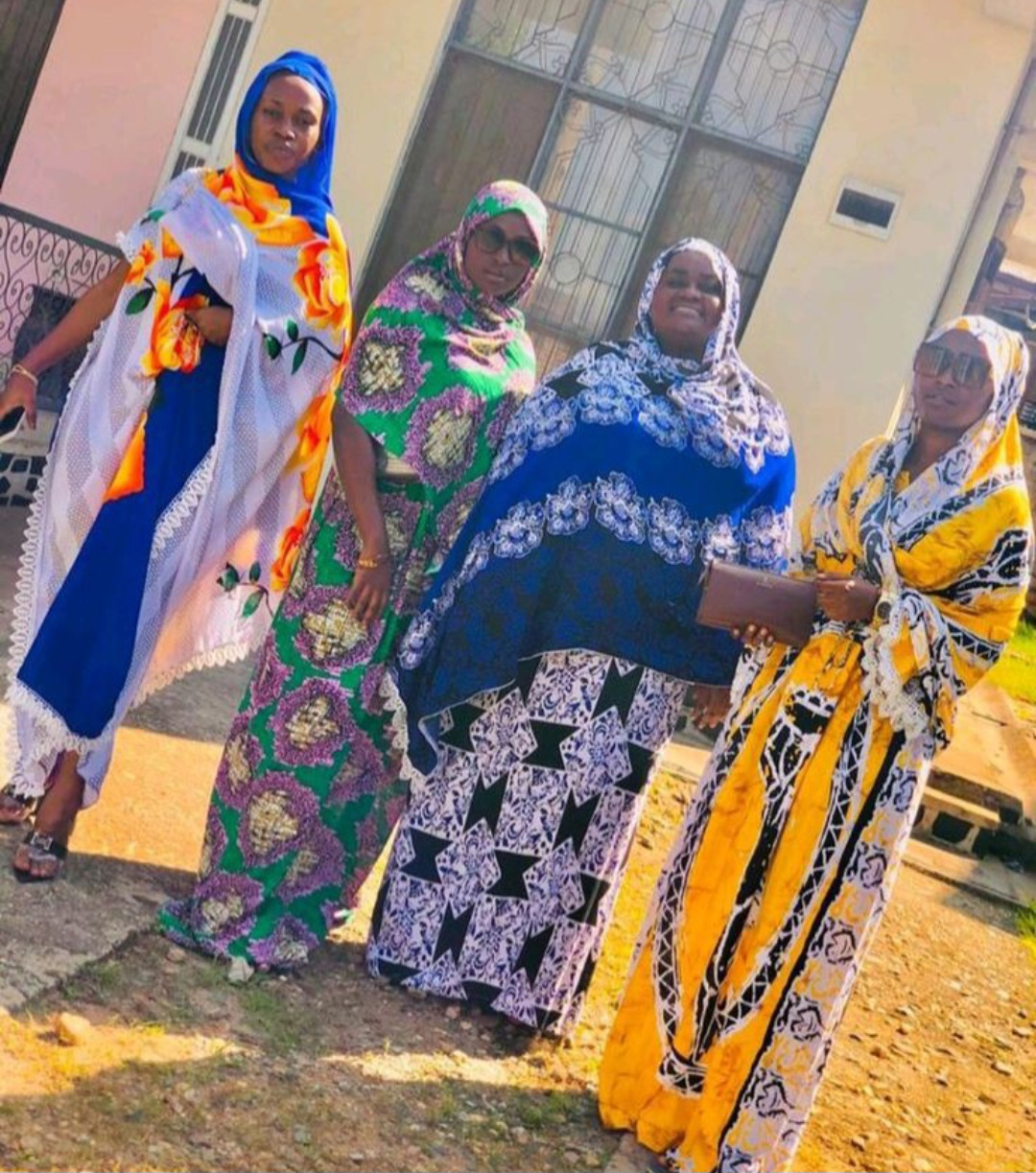
Group photo of Hunde women

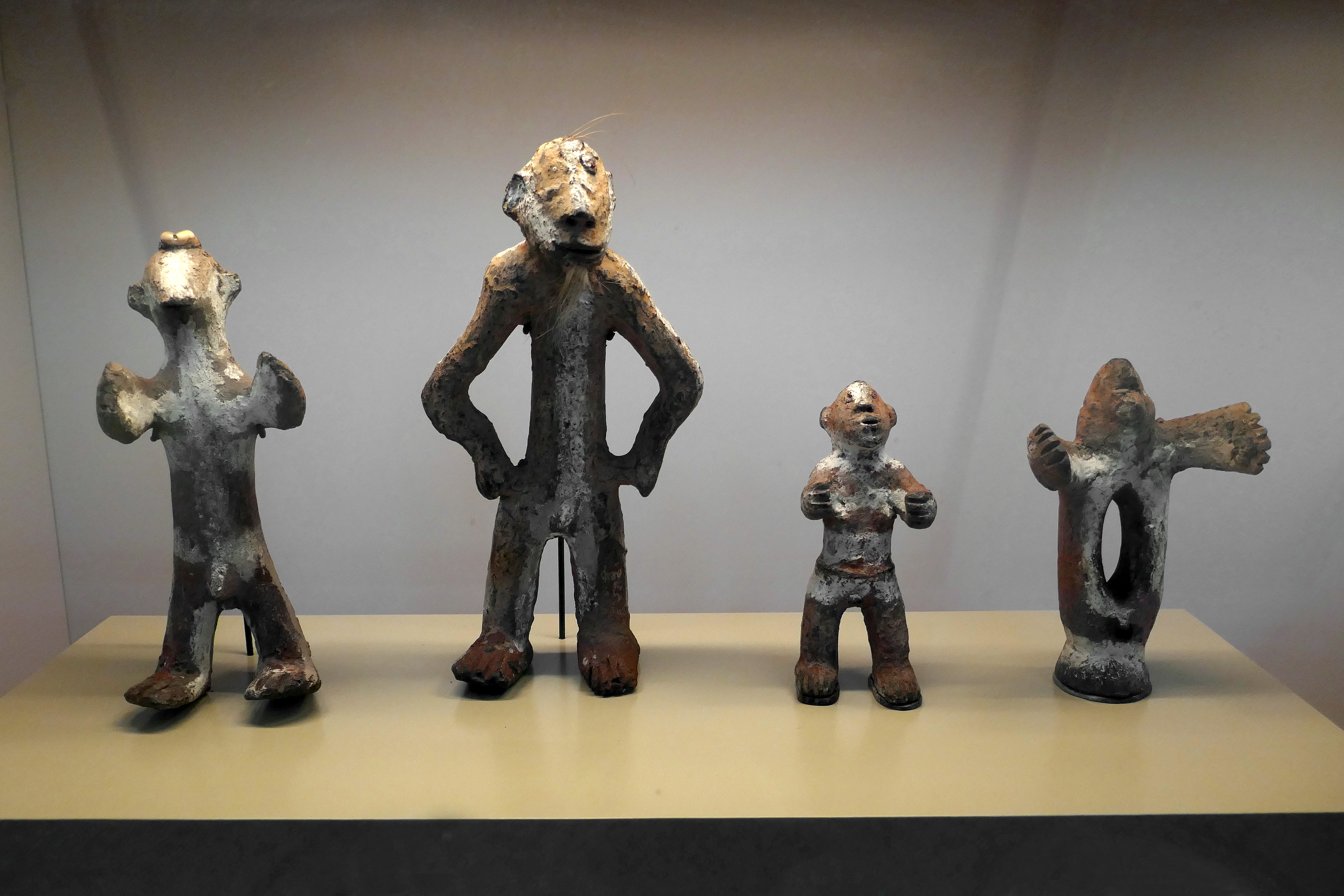
Nande clay figurines, Royal Museum for Central Africa.

North Kivu has long been home to Bantu-speaking populations. The Hunde people, for example, historically settled an area stretching from the northwest of Lake Kivu to Lake Edward. The Tembo occupied the lower-lying regions, while further west, the Havu and Yira (Nande) established themselves. Evidence suggests that human settlement in North Kivu predates the timelines proposed by early colonial writers, who generally placed it in the 16th and 17th centuries. According to Alfred Moeller de Laddersous, population movements in the region followed a northeast–southwest axis. The Bahunde and Bayira populations absorbed earlier groups, including the Bahera, Habombe, Bakira, Bahambo, Vitu, Batangi, and Bamate. However, historians like Mashauri Kule Tambite argue that these groups were not migrants but have always inhabited the region. From this perspective, the Yira (Nande) were part of the Kitara Empire, and the Rwenzori mountain range was historically known as Kitara-Kya-Nzururu. Bashizi Cirhagarhula, cited by Célestin Kabuya Lumuna Sando, notes that the Bahunde have occupied their current territory since at least the 9th century CE. Hunde oral traditions, including the legend of Mulingito, which recounts the earthquake that gave rise to Lake Kivu, trace their origins back to "time immemorial". The Kingdom of Bunyoro, often associated with the Bahunde and Banyanga, evolved from the Kitara Empire, which once covered a vast region. Similar linguistic, political, and cultural traits among North Kivu's various ethnic groups suggest a shared and deeply rooted history.

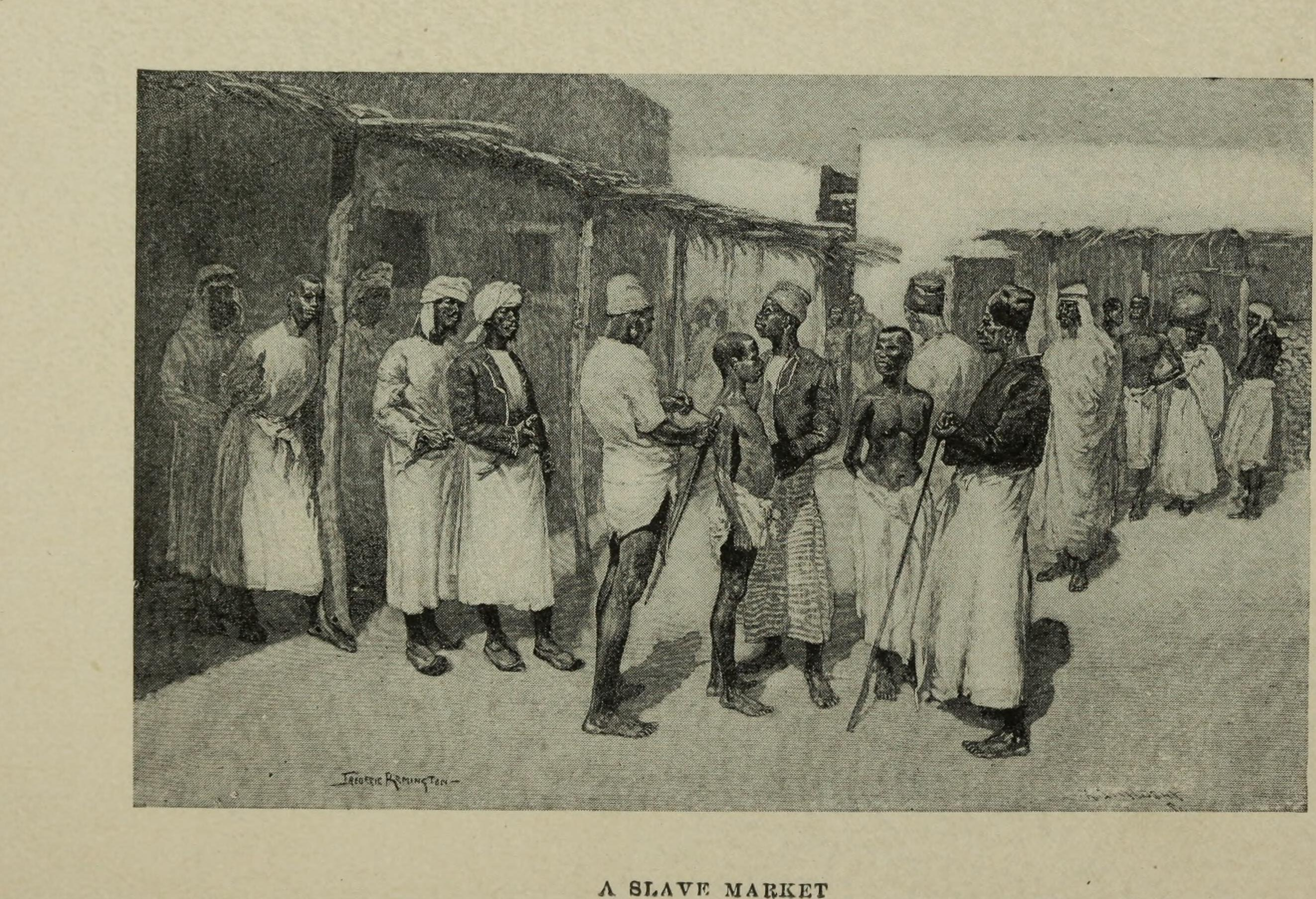
A 19th-century image showing an Arab-Swahili slave market, a typical scene in East and Central Africa during the height of the 19th-century slave trade.

During the East African slave trade, Swahili traders carried out raids deep into the Congo River basin and, at the height of their influence, spawned armed groups that operated from Swahili-speaking trade centers in what is now southern Maniema. These groups, known as Arabisés, people influenced by the Arab culture of the East African coast, conducted incursions into Walikale Territory and Masisi Territory in the mid-1890s, the most infamous led by a commander named Lukundula. Shortly afterward, mutineers from a Belgian colonial expedition passed through the same region. Originally from the Tetela ethnic group in the Kasaï region to the southwest, these troops rebelled against their abusive commander, Francis Dhanis, and rampaged across the eastern Congo Free State for several years. A more controversial attack in the region's history involves the expansionist Rwandan King Kigeli IV Rwabugiri, who allegedly sought to extend his influence into the Kivu highlands. Some Rwandan historians claim that Rwabugiri conquered large parts of Rutshuru Territory, Masisi Territory, and Walikale Territory, a claim that was cited for political purposes, including by President Pasteur Bizimungu before the 1996 invasion of Zaire. Most local sources and historians, however, reject this account, arguing that Rwandan kings controlled only a few chiefdoms near Rwanda, such as Jomba and Bwisha. Rwabugiri's expeditions into Masisi Territory and Walikale Territory primarily involved local chiefs paying tribute rather than direct control. In areas like Jomba and Bwisha, he relied on political alliances rather than force. Although Rwabugiri's campaigns disrupted local chiefdoms and exacerbated feuds among them, the real power during this period often lay with external forces, including European colonizers. Local militias, when raised, were generally temporary and limited in size. The most significant armed mobilizations were almost always driven by these external groups.

=== Coloniazation ===
The impact of Europeans in North Kivu was profound and far-reaching, as they arrived first as explorers and missionaries and later as administrators, who radically reshaped social and political structures. The earliest colonial posts were established in Bobandana, a small bay overlooking Lake Kivu, and Rutshuru Territory in 1902, followed in 1907 by a post in Kitofu, Masisi Territory. The new authorities quickly set about reorganizing local power structures to serve their administrative and economic goals. In 1910, the Belgian and German governments finalized the border between their colonies, drawing a line north from Lake Kivu through the volcanic mountains of Nyiragongo and Karisimbi, which ended disputes over contested territory in the Petit Nord (which includes areas such as the city of Goma, Masisi Territory, Rutshuru Territory, Walikale Territory, and Nyiragongo Territory). That same year, the colonial government issued a decree recognizing chiefdoms but placing them firmly under Belgian administrative and military control. The Belgians redefined customary rule by "regrouping small chiefdoms into new divisions called sectors".

In Masisi Territory, the "Bahunde sector" (now Bahunde Chiefdom) was created in 1921 under Mwami André Kalinda, whose father had been supported by the Belgians in a local power struggle. With strong ties to the Catholic Church and the colonial authorities, Kalinda's Grande Chefferie des Bahunde (Great Bahunde Chiefdom) expanded rapidly, encompassing all of present-day Masisi Territory by 1935, far larger than his original chiefdom. That same year, Masisi Territory was officially established on 15 March 1935 at Bution, within the Waloa-Yangu groupement. Kalinda was also granted extraordinary powers, including the authority to preside over customary tribunals and to levy administrative taxes. A similar process happened in what is today Rutshuru Territory, where the Belgians consolidated previously autonomous chiefs under Daniel Ndeze, a Hutu translator and adviser, creating Bwisha Chiefdom. Scholars note that this form of decentralized despotism produced rulers with unchecked authority and allowed them to claim power over ethnically diverse populations with little ability to hold them accountable. Colonial rule also redefined indigeneity, recognizing only certain groups as "native", while later-arriving Rwandophone communities had no guaranteed land rights and depended on alliances with local chiefs. This system laid the foundation for the territorialization of identity.

Resistance to colonial domination erupted repeatedly. In southern Masisi Territory, Chief Ngyko, a Hunde leader, defied the Europeans, forcing several military expeditions against him. One of the most notable uprisings took place among the Kumu of Walikale Territory during the 1944 Kitawala rebellion, a millenarian movement influenced by Jehovah's Witnesses that opposed colonial taxes, forced labor, and European authority as contrary to divine law. Earlier revolts, such as the 1931 Binji Binji uprising in South Kivu and several Nyabingi uprisings in Rutshuru Territory, followed a similar pattern, as they were organized by religious leaders and carried out by peasants and workers, with customary elites largely absent.

Due to the long distances that had to be traveled on foot between the Gisenyi post and Masisi, the territorial capital was successively relocated to several sites. It was first moved to Rusika in the Biiri groupement of the Osso-Banyungu sector, on Nyarufaranga Hill at a site now known as Katale along the Goma–Masisi road. From there, it was transferred to Matopfu in the Bashali-Kaembe groupement, located on the Masisi–Nyamitaba road, and then to Nyambatsi in the Bapfuna groupement of the Osso-Banyungu sector, near the Kahanga market. Later, the capital was established at Nyonyi in the Bahala locality within the Baptuna groupement of the Osso-Banyungu sector. Eventually, the capital became known as Masisi-Nyonyi, and later simply Masisi.

=== Banyarwanda immigration ===
When the Belgian government assumed control from King Leopold II in 1908, the eastern Belgian Congo remained scarcely developed, with the first plantations appearing only around 1920. By 1930, Costermansville (now Bukavu) had just 300 settlers, while Masisi Territory hosted only 83. The Belgian administration launched a major public works campaign but was undermined by the global financial depression of the 1920s. To reduce costs, it partially outsourced development in the Kivus to the Comité National du Kivu (CNKi, National Committee of Kivu), which was granted vast tracts of land, initially eight million hectares, later scaled back, and profited by leasing and selling it to foreign settlers. Indigenous Congolese were barred from obtaining land titles until 1953. Under a decree issued by King Leopold at the outset of colonization, any land deemed "vacant", even if managed under customary authority, belonged to the state and could be expropriated cheaply for settlers. This laid the foundation for private property rights that would later clash with traditional land tenure systems that created ongoing vulnerabilities for local populations.

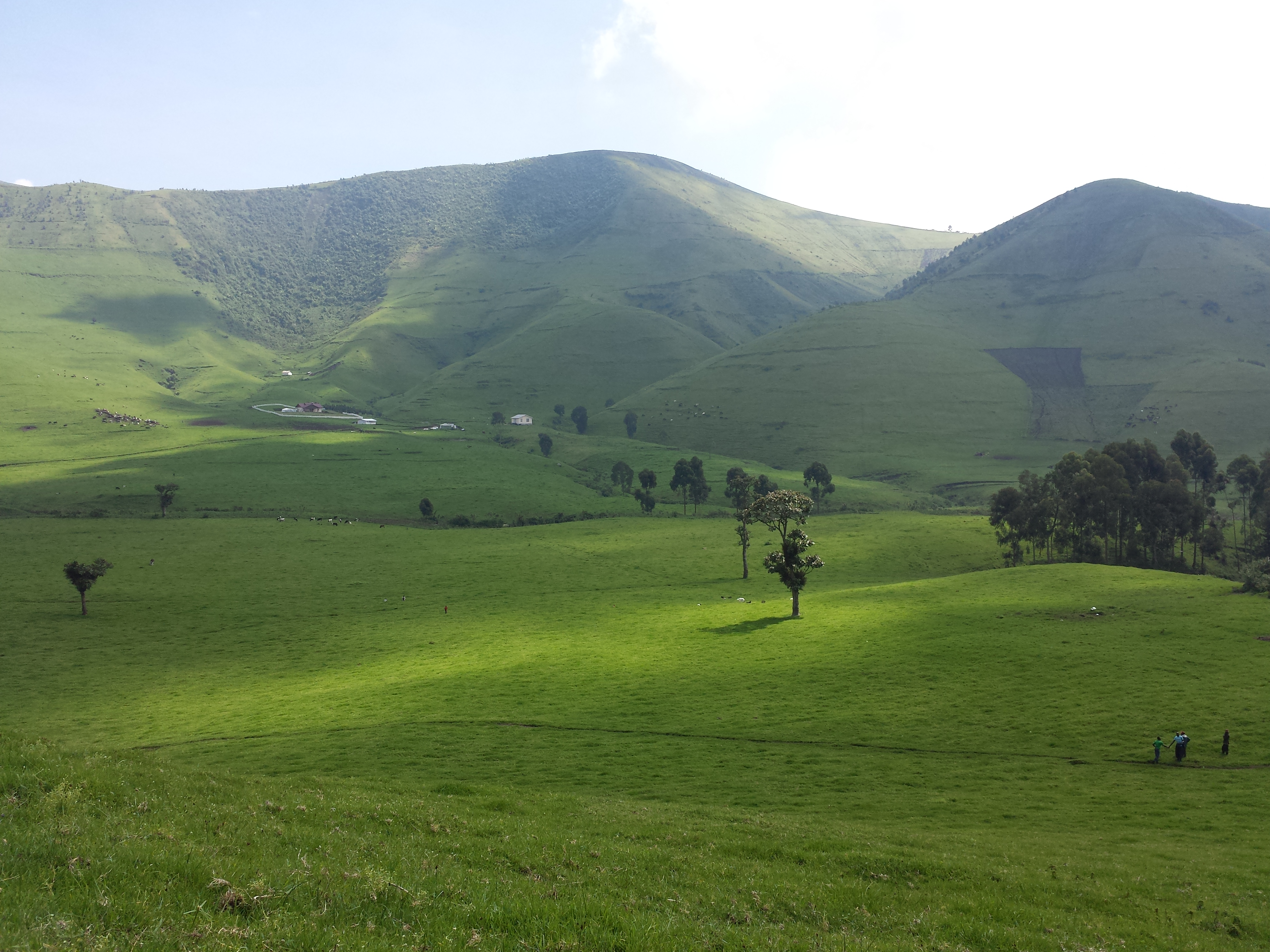
A view of the landscape from the hills of Masisi

European settlers concentrated on Masisi Territory, Rutshuru Territory, Lubero Territory, and Fizi Territory, regions with fertile soil and relatively low population density. Masisi Territory and the Bwito Chiefdom in Rutshuru Territory were especially prized for their favorable climate and arable land. While exact figures are difficult to determine, it is clear that Europeans acquired much of the highlands' best farmland. In addition, 35,800 hectares of Masisi Territory were designated in 1925 to form Africa's first national park, the Albert National Park (now Virunga National Park). As the settler population grew, so too did the demand for labor, which was acute on plantations and in mining operations across South Kivu and Maniema. The shortage was particularly severe in Masisi Territory, where the Hunde were reluctant to work for colonial authorities or settlers. To address this, private companies and later the colonial government recruited laborers from neighboring Rwanda. This strategy provided a more compliant workforce dependent on Belgian officials for land and employment and alleviated overpopulation in Rwanda, where famines had periodically devastated peasant communities. During the first wave of recruitment, from 1928 to 1936, private companies and European settlers registered 17,902 Rwandans, mostly men, though many likely crossed the border unregistered. Initially, these laborers arrived alone and lived in temporary camps, but as it became harder to recruit individual workers, the Belgian administration shifted to relocating entire families to selected areas, which embedded new populations and fundamentally altered North Kivu's social and demographic landscape.

To manage mass migration to Masisi Territory, the colonial administrations of Rwanda and the Congo established the Mission d'Immigration des Banyarwanda (MIB) in 1937. These changes could not have been implemented without the collaboration of local chiefs, and to accommodate the new arrivals, the colonial authorities purchased 47,810 hectares of land from Mwami André Kalinda for just 7,000 Belgian francs, which is now an infamous transaction equivalent to roughly $20,000 today for an area the size of New York's boroughs of Queens, Brooklyn, and Manhattan. This territory became the new Gishari Chiefdom, with its administrative center in Nyamitaba, and local Hunde were forced to vacate, though some resisted. For the indigenous population, this land sale and mass immigration marked the start of what they saw as Rwandan domination, and within a decade, the Hunde became minorities on their own land, which, according to Jason Stearns, a reality that continues to shape perceptions today. The first immigrants to Gishari Chiefdom were predominantly Tutsi, which reflected the Belgian prejudices they held that Hutu required Tutsi supervision. The first chief, Bideri, personally appointed by Rwandan King Mutara III Rudahigwa, arrived with the earliest wave of so-called transplantés, Rwandans resettled in the Congo before independence, and Gishari Chiefdom remained linked to the Rwandan kingdom, even paying tribute to King Rudahigwa. In 1942, Bideri was replaced by another Tutsi, Wilfrid Bucyanayandi, who asserted greater independence from Rwanda. Soon, however, most new immigrants were Hutu, both to prevent an overabundance of cattle, a symbol of Tutsi status, and because colonial officials believed that Hutu, often of a sturdier build, were better suited for manual labor.

Between 1937 and 1945, the MIB facilitated the immigration of roughly 100,000 Rwandans to Gishari Chiefdom, excluding those who arrived independently. By 1945, the chiefdom was saturated with immigrants, and the colonial administration temporarily halted arrivals, though migration to other parts of Masisi Territory, Rutshuru Territory, and Kalehe Territory continued until 1956. By 1957, Belgian authorities actively discouraged further migration, citing rising population densities and concerns over Tutsi chiefs, especially Bucyanayandi, who were growing too powerful. That year, the colonial government abolished Gishari Chiefdom, dividing it into three parts, restoring Mwami André Kalinda's authority, removing the Banyarwanda's land rights, undermining their claims to "indigenous" status, and weakening their sense of belonging in the eyes of their neighbors. Additional waves of Rwandan immigration happened during the upheavals surrounding Rwandan independence (1959–1962) and the ethnic purges of 1973, bringing an estimated 30,000–50,000 refugees, including members of the Tutsi elite who later became prominent in Goma's upper class. In total, colonial-era estimates suggest that between 150,000 and 300,000 Rwandans settled in the region. The combination of these waves of immigration, massive land expropriations, and Belgian reforms of customary rule laid the groundwork for ongoing conflict. By the end of the colonial period, roughly one-third of Masisi Territory, including some of the best farmland, had been earmarked for Rwandan immigrants, European settlers, or the Virunga National Park, while population density in Masisi Territory and Rutshuru Territory had quadrupled. Banyarwanda became the largest ethnic group in the Petit Nord, which was a demographic shift that carried into the post-colonial era. These tensions have persisted in contemporary politics, especially in the 2006 legislative elections, for example, Hutu and Tutsi candidates won 14 of 16 contested seats in Masisi Territory and Rutshuru Territory. Meanwhile, customary and administrative power remained in the hands of demographically marginalized traditional elites, many of whom fiercely opposed the immigrants. In Masisi Territory, Hunde authorities, newly empowered by Belgian rule, resented the loss of much of their land, which set the stage for the outbreak of violence shortly after Congo gained independence in 1960.

=== Post-independence politics and rising tensions ===
By the pre-independence elections of 1958, Rwandan immigrants had been granted voting rights by the outgoing colonial government and promptly secured 80 percent of local council seats. But despite this political success, Banyarwanda largely failed to displace the entrenched elites of the Petit Nord, leaving high-level positions in the hands of the Nande, Hunde, and Nyanga. These leaders, particularly the Hunde, used their authority to consolidate control over the local administrative apparatus, from the quartier level to the chiefdoms. Banyarwanda officials were dismissed, and Hunde chiefs were installed even in areas that had previously had few Hunde, granting them oversight of taxation, communal labor, and legal arbitration, a situation that fueled resentment within the Banyarwanda community. Shortly after independence, the new national government of the Republic of Congo (Congo-Léopoldville) decentralized power, creating twenty-one provincettes (mini-provinces) and splitting Kivu into today's North Kivu, South Kivu, and Maniema. This heightened communal tensions, as indigenous communities gained greater control over police and judicial institutions, which they then wielded over their rivals. In 1962, these strains briefly erupted into violence when gangs of Hutu youths attacked police stations in Kibabi and Karuba, killing several officers. The provincial assembly responded by setting up a commission to investigate what it labeled a "Banyarwanda problem". The commission recommended expelling all Tutsi, revising voting laws to disenfranchise Banyarwanda, and deporting even long-settled Tutsi families. Although the final recommendation was never implemented, the other measures were adopted.

Tensions erupted again in May 1965 after disputed local elections in which Hunde candidates performed unexpectedly well. Banyarwanda clashed with Hunde and local security forces, administrative buildings were burned, and contemporary press reports cited hundreds of deaths on both sides. This conflict, known as la Guerre de Kanyarwanda (the Kanyarwanda War), led the provincial assembly to label Banyarwanda collectively as rebels and once again call for their expulsion.

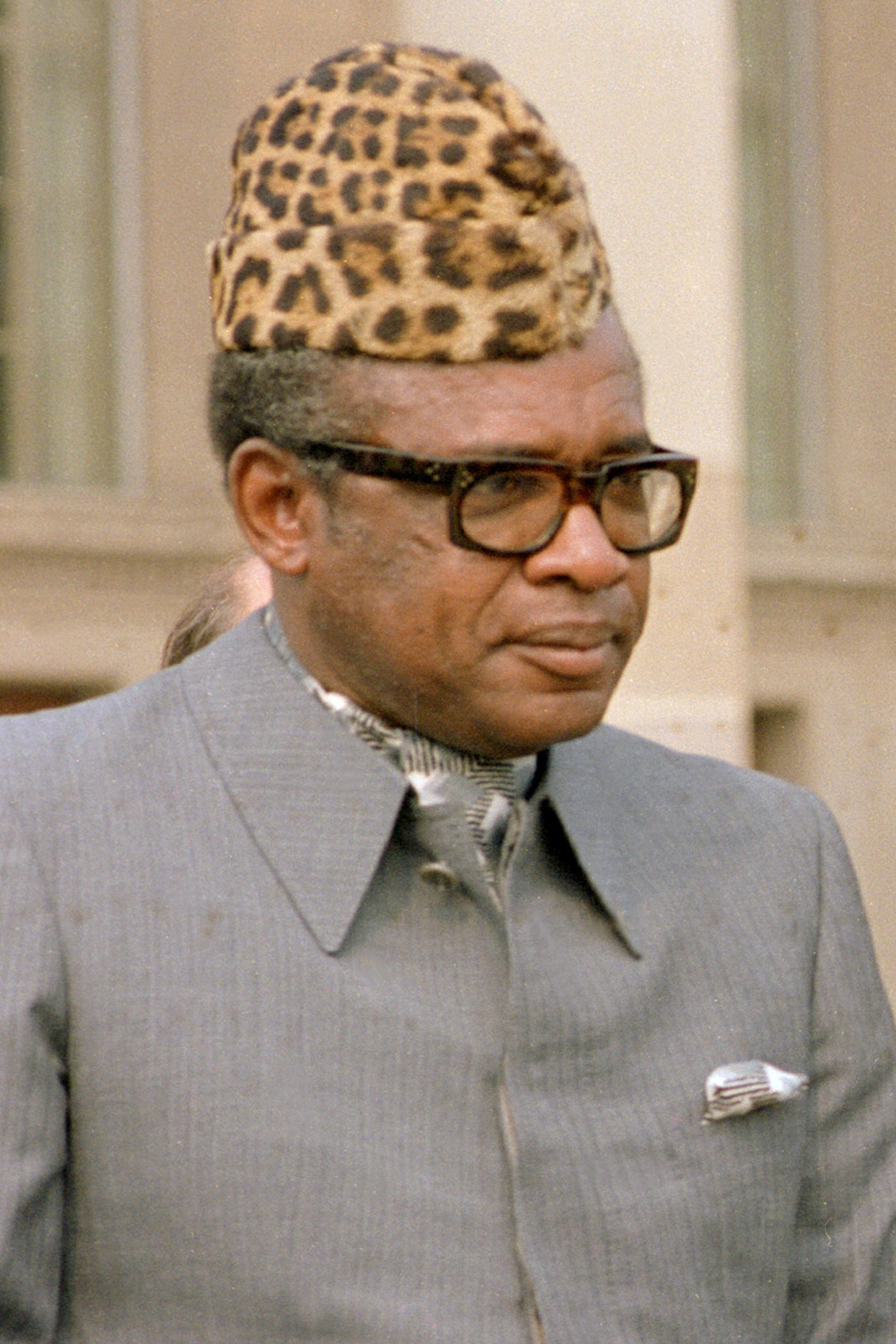
Mobutu Sese Seko sporting a typical abacost in 1983.

The coup d'état of Colonel Joseph Mobutu in 1965 was welcomed by many in the Kivus, who hoped a strong leader would restore order. Mobutu's appointment of outsiders to local administrative posts temporarily defused competition over power, yet his shifting policies on citizenship and land tenure created new tensions. In 1972, influenced by prominent Banyarwanda from North Kivu, particularly his chief of staff Barthélemy Bisengimana, Mobutu passed a law granting citizenship en masse to anyone who had immigrated before 1960. Excluded from customary land access due to their lack of recognized native authority, affluent Banyarwanda, many of whom had fled Rwanda following independence-era pogroms, capitalized on this law and the broader Mobutu-era principle that loyalty to the regime brought material rewards, acquiring large tracts of land in North Kivu. However, in 1981, the 1972 law was reversed, granting automatic citizenship only to those whose families could prove they had arrived before 1885. This revision cast doubt on the legal rights, including land tenure, of up to half a million Banyarwanda in North Kivu, among them Congolese Tutsi communities who increasingly identified as Banyamulenge. By asserting that their collective ancestry originated in Mulenge village of Bafuliiru Chiefdom in the South Kivu province and dated back to the nineteenth century, these communities sought to claim legitimacy as Congolese rather than outsiders. Throughout the 1980s, campaigns to exclude Rwandan immigrants from political power continued, with Banyarwanda systematically barred from local and legislative elections. In 1987, members of the national parliament from the Kivus convinced the ruling Mouvement Populaire de la Révolution (MPR) to remove Rwandophone candidates from electoral lists, and protests over their candidacies led to the postponement of the 1989 elections in North Kivu. Some members of the Mutuelle des Agriculteurs des Virunga (MAGRIVI), a mutual association representing Hutu farmers, began to radicalize, and small armed groups linked to the movement started to emerge. In May 1991, armed Hutu units attacked officials supervising the population census in Masisi Territory, and the crisis intensified during the National Sovereign Conference (Conférence Nationale Souveraine – CNS), where Nande and Hunde delegates argued that the Banyarwanda should be excluded from future elections. The conference, which was intended to guide the transition from Mobutu's one-party rule, lent its moral weight to Mobutu's aggressive citizenship law from a decade earlier, though it acknowledged that it did not have the mandate to "render people stateless". At the provincial level, Governor Jean-Pierre Kalumbo, a Nande politician and leader of the DCF/Nyamwisi party, encouraged young members of indigenous communities to organize ethnic self-defence militias, including the Ngilima militia among the Nande and the Mayi-Mayi militias among the Hunde and Nyanga, to partly counterbalance the armed groups associated with MAGRIVI. Meanwhile, both the demographics and the rural economy of North Kivu were undergoing dramatic change. Between the first wave of massive immigration in the 1930s and the conflicts of the 1990s, the population in the highlands of Masisi Territory and Rutshuru Territory had nearly tenfold increased. In Masisi Territory, for example, population density rose from 12 people per square kilometer in 1940 to 111 per square kilometer by 1990. These figures understate the pressures, as many new plantations and ranches were fenced off, which forced the growing population into increasingly limited land. Cattle numbers in Masisi Territory similarly surged, from 21,000 in 1959 to 113,000 in 1983, and heightening competition for grazing and farmland and making survival ever more precarious for peasants.

The 1966 Bakajika Law vested ownership of all land in the state, which allowed Kinshasa to seize lands abandoned by their owners or deemed underused. The 1973 Land Law went further, rejecting customary titles and declaring the state the sole legal authority over land ownership. For customary chiefs in Masisi Territory and Rutshuru Territory, already wary of Banyarwanda immigration, these laws represented a direct threat to their authority. That same year, the government implemented Zairianisation, nationalizing some of North Kivu's largest ranches and subsequently granting them to allies of the president. These reforms transformed the province's economy, cemented ties between Mobutu's ruling party and local landed elites, and destabilized land tenure for peasants. As access to land for "indigenous" populations became increasingly precarious, Banyarwanda were able to purchase more property. Ownership allowed them to bypass traditional obligations to the Mwami, which fueled resentment among local communities over their growing wealth and influence. Customary authority no longer guaranteed secure livelihoods. Numerous documented cases show that businessmen, often in collusion with chiefs and provincial land registries, manipulated property boundaries to the detriment of peasants holding customary titles.

== Conflict ==
=== Masisi War (1991–1996) ===
==== Rising ethnic tensions and the outbreak of violence (1991–1993) ====
From 1992 onward, disputes over land ownership, combined with ethno-political rivalries, increasingly led to violence, as targeted killings and attacks became more frequent, and mutual fear spread among the communities, with each group fearing aggression from the others. By 1993, in Walikale Territory, some Hunde and Nyanga groups believed that an attack by Hutu forces was imminent. In March 1993, Governor Jean-Pierre Kalumbo reportedly called on the Forces Armées Zaïroises (FAZ) to support the Ngilima militia and the Hunde and Nyanga Mayi-Mayi in an effort to "exterminate the Banyarwanda". On 18 March 1993, the Vice-Governor Bamwisho, from Walikale Territory, delivered an incendiary speech against the Banyarwanda in the Ntoto village. Two days later, on 20 March, armed Hunde and Nyanga Mayi-Mayi units attacked the market of Ntoto, a village located on the border between Walikale Territory and Masisi Territory, killing dozens of Hutu peasants. The attackers used rifles, knives, arrows, and spears. On 21 March 1993, the same Mayi-Mayi group reportedly killed dozens of Banyarwanda in the neighboring village of Buoye. The attack occurred as many victims were leaving Catholic and Protestant churches, and some who attempted to flee drowned in the Lowa River while escaping. The violence quickly spread beyond Walikale Territory, reaching Masisi Territory and later Rutshuru Territory. During March and April 1993, armed Hunde Mayi-Mayi units killed an unknown number of Hutu civilians in Kambule, in the Katoyi sector, before burning Hutu homes as they withdrew. Retaliatory attacks followed, and in April 1993, Hutu armed groups killed at least twelve Hunde civilians, including children, in the village of Mulinde in Masisi Territory. Victims were killed with machetes, hoes, and axes. The same month, armed Hutu units reportedly killed around fifty people, mostly Hunde, in the village of Ngingwe in Bashali Chiefdom. Armed Hutu groups then burned the primary school and the health center in Kiusha, also located in Bashali Chiefdom. In the nearby village of Muhongozi, they set fire to a church belonging to the 8th CEPZA (Communauté des Eglises de Pentecôte au Zaïre, now Communauté des Églises de Pentecôte en Afrique Centrale) and killed an unknown number of civilians. On 22 July 1993, armed Hutu units supported by elements of the FAZ killed at least 48 people, most of them Hunde but also three Hutus, in the village of Binza in northern Masisi Territory. Victims were shot or killed with machetes or spears. One eyewitness later reported that some bodies were mutilated, and that a pregnant woman was disemboweled.

During the same period, several nearby villages were attacked, including Kalembe on 25 July 1993. On 7 September 1993, Hutu militiamen killed at least 38 displaced Hunde civilians, including women and children, in the village of Kibachiro on Karobe Hill. These victims had previously fled their homes because of insecurity and had gathered in Kibachiro hoping to find safety. Instead, they became the target of another deadly attack.

Determining the exact number of victims during the first months of the conflict is extremely difficult. Each community involved in the violence has its own interpretation of events and its own estimate of the death toll, and massacres took place in isolated and widely dispersed locations, some of which remain difficult to access even today. When researchers have been able to visit these sites, it has often been impossible to find direct witnesses, as the successive wars that later devastated the province forced many surviving villagers to flee or permanently relocate. The Ntoto massacre became one of the most widely cited events of this early period, where the figure most often mentioned is around 500 deaths. At the broader provincial level, Médecins Sans Frontières (MSF) estimated in 1995 that between 6,000 and 15,000 people were killed between March and May 1993, while approximately 250,000 people were displaced by the violence.

==== Regional destabilization and escalation after the Rwandan genocide (1994–1996) ====
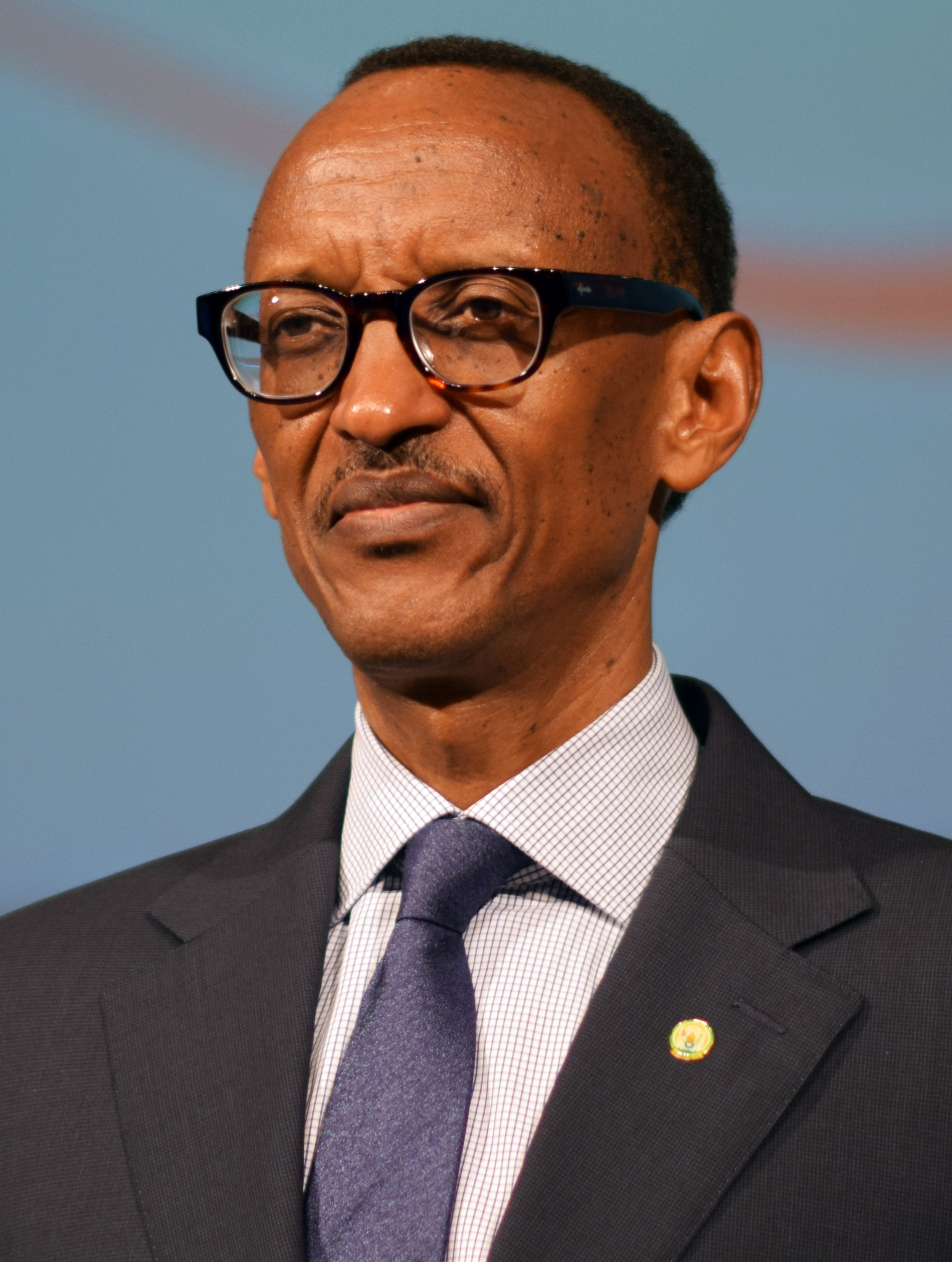
Paul Kagame was the commander of the Rwandan Patriotic Front (RPF)

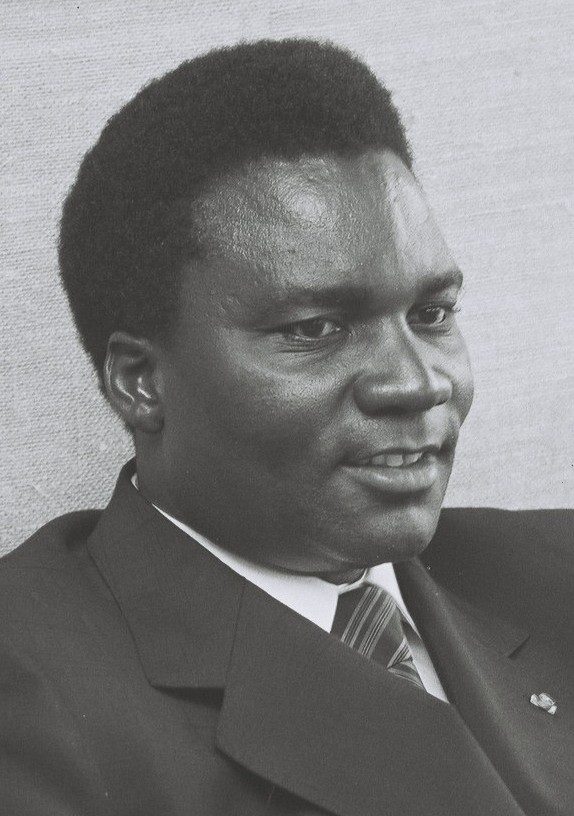
Juvénal Habyarimana was the commander-in-chief of the Rwandan government's armed forces, known as the Rwandan Armed Forces (FAR).

In July 1993, President Mobutu travelled to Goma and ordered the deployment of troops from the Special Presidential Division (DSP) to restore order in the region. With changes in the provincial leadership, aimed at providing more balanced representation among the various communities, and through dialogue among civil society organizations between November 1993 and February 1994, a fragile calm gradually returned to North Kivu. But the underlying causes of the conflict remained unresolved, which left the situation highly unstable, and this fragile balance was dramatically disrupted in July 1994, when more than 700,000 Rwandan Hutu refugees, including former members of the Rwandan Armed Forces (ex-FAR) and many Interahamwe militia responsible for the genocide in Rwanda, arrived in North Kivu between 14 and 17 July 1994. Their long-term presence significantly worsened insecurity in the region, and, for many local communities already in conflict with the Banyarwanda, the arrival of these refugees revived fears of Rwandan political and military domination. MAGRIVI Hutu armed units quickly formed alliances with the ex-FAR and Interahamwe, and strengthened their position against the Hunde and Nyanga Mayi-Mayi militias and the Nande Ngilima militia. From late 1994 onward, the ethnic conflict resumed with even greater intensity than in 1993. During this period, the previously fragile solidarity between Hutu and Tutsi Banyarwanda collapsed. For several years, tensions had already existed between these two groups. Many Tutsis had joined the Rwandan Patriotic Front (RPF) during its struggle against the Rwandan government, while many Hutu cooperated with the security forces of President Juvénal Habyarimana to prevent the RPF from recruiting fighters in Zaire. After the Rwandan 1994 genocide and the RPF's victory in Kigali, the split between Hutu and Tutsi Banyarwanda became definitive, and between July 1994 and March 1995, more than 200,000 Tutsis left North Kivu and returned to Rwanda. Some returned voluntarily to take advantage of employment opportunities in the army and administration of the new Rwandan government, while others fled growing hostility and attacks from Hutu militias, ex-FAR/Interahamwe fighters, and renewed ethnic violence involving Hunde and Nyanga Mayi-Mayi groups. For the Tutsi population in Goma and elsewhere in North Kivu, the second half of 1994 became increasingly dangerous, as many Tutsis were harassed by other communities and, at times, by state authorities. They often lost their jobs, and many became targets of threats, intimidation, extortion, rape, and looting. An unknown number of Tutsis were killed or died during this period. In August 1995, in an effort to regain control of the situation, and possibly also in response to pressure from the Rwandan authorities, the Zairian government decided to expel Hutu refugees. Between 19 and 23 August 1995, FAZ soldiers forcibly repatriated several thousand Rwandan refugees from the Mugunga camp, located a few kilometers from Goma. They were transported by truck to the Rwandan border and handed over to Rwandan authorities, and during the operation, FAZ troops reportedly looted refugees' belongings and set fire to huts and shops inside the camp. The operation was widely condemned by the international community and quickly proved disastrous. Many refugees, convinced that they would face death if they returned to Rwanda, fled the camps and sought refuge among Hutus living in the surrounding countryside, and their arrival in these rural areas was accompanied by new waves of looting and violence in Masisi Territory and Rutshuru Territory.

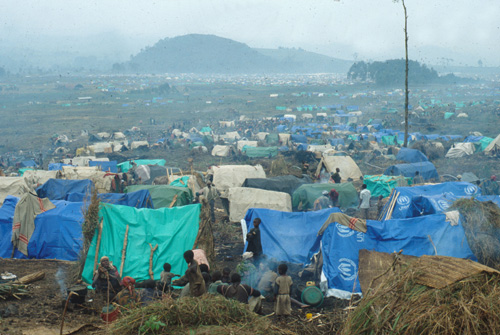
Refugee camp for Rwandans in Kibumba following the Rwandan genocide.

On 17 November 1995, armed Hutu units killed around forty Hunde civilians in the village of Mutobo in Masisi Territory, including their chief Bandu Wabo. In retaliation, on 9 December 1995, Hunde Mayi-Mayi fighters attacked Bikenge village in Masisi Territory, killing between 26 and 30 Hutus and four FAZ soldiers. The attack was intended to avenge the death of Chief Bandu Wabo, but these cycles of revenge killings led to massacres and the massive displacement of civilians, which eventually created ethnically homogeneous enclaves in parts of Masisi Territory and Rutshuru Territory. The remaining Tutsi population in North Kivu, numbering only a few thousand, became particularly vulnerable. While some Hunde Mayi-Mayi groups formed temporary alliances with them, other militias attacked them, just as did the ex-FAR/Interahamwe forces and Hutu militias associated with MAGRIVI.

Throughout 1995, the role of FAZ became increasingly ambiguous, as in some cases, they protected Tutsis from attacks, but in other situations they directly targeted them. During the first half of 1996, FAZ forces forcibly expelled an unknown number of Tutsis living in Goma and Rutshuru Territory, Masisi Territory, and Lubero Territory to Rwanda. Before being expelled, many victims were subjected to inhumane and degrading treatment, and their homes were often looted and their property confiscated. Around 3 February 1996, armed Hunde Mayi-Mayi fighters killed at least 18 Tutsi civilians at the Osso-Banyungu farm and looted cattle and other property. The victims were part of a group of internally displaced Tutsis who had taken refuge there in late 1995. On 4 March 1996, armed Hutu and ex-FAR/Interahamwe units killed about a dozen Tutsis in the village of Bukombo in Rutshuru Territory. Some victims were burned alive when their homes were set on fire, while others were killed with machetes. The attackers looted and burned several houses before leaving. Survivors fled to Birambizu parish, where they were attacked again in the following weeks. Another massacre occurred on 12 May 1996, when Hutu armed units killed several dozen displaced Hunde and Tutsi civilians at the Mokoto Monastery Cheese Factory. Hundreds of displaced people had taken refuge at the monastery earlier in the year after fleeing attacks by Hutu militias and ex-FAR/Interahamwe forces. In the aftermath of the massacre, a few hundred survivors fled toward Kitchanga. Violence continued along the border areas, and between 8 and 11 June 1996, armed Hutu and ex-FAR/Interahamwe fighters from the Katale and Mugunga refugee camps killed dozens of Tutsi civilians near Bunagana and Jomba, including the local administrative official of Chengerero village, located about 10 kilometers from Bunagana. This massacre was believed to have been retaliation for an attack carried out a few days earlier by Rwandan and Ugandan troops at Bunagana, which had resulted in the deaths of at least twenty Hutu civilians.

==== Military operations and escalating violence ====
In late 1995, faced with the "growing insecurity in the territories of Masisi and Rutshuru", the FAZ launched a series of military operations to dismantle the numerous armed groups and militias operating across North Kivu. Rather than restoring order, however, these campaigns were frequently accompanied by serious abuses against civilians, and one of the most notable incidents happened on 17 December 1995, when FAZ soldiers, accompanied by Hutu militiamen, reportedly killed dozens of civilians, most of whom were Hunde, in Masisi and nearby villages. During the attack, soldiers looted and burned large parts of Masisi, destroying numerous buildings, including a school and other public infrastructure. The attack was widely believed to be retaliation for the deaths of four FAZ soldiers in Bikenge village earlier that month, on 9 December 1995. In an attempt to stabilize the situation, the Zairian government deployed approximately 800 additional troops to Masisi Territory in March 1996, with forces that included soldiers from the DSP, members of the Military Action and Intelligence Service (SARM), and para-commando units from the 312th Battalion. The campaign, known as Operation "Kimia", the Lingala word for "peace", briefly restored a fragile calm in the region. But the operation quickly encountered major difficulties, and due to insufficient manpower, weak logistical support, and a lack of financial resources, the FAZ failed to effectively disarm the numerous militias active in the region. Some soldiers reportedly even abused their position and engaged in livestock looting and extortion. In certain cases, FAZ units allegedly demanded money from Tutsi civilians in exchange for escorting them safely to Goma or across the border into Rwanda. Two months later, in May 1996, the Zairian authorities launched another campaign, Operation "Mbata", meaning "slap" in Lingala, to disarm the Hunde and Nyanga Mayi-Mayi militias as well as the Nande Ngilima militia. Like the previous operation, however, it quickly faltered, as the effort was undermined by low morale among the troops, hostility from local populations, and determined resistance from the militias themselves.

On 10 May 1996, armed Nande fighters reportedly killed at least four Hutu civilians in the village of Vitshumbi, in Rutshuru Territory. According to some accounts, local residents had called on the Ngilima militia to expel FAZ soldiers who were accused of committing abuses in the area. The Hutu victims were allegedly targeted because they were suspected of collaborating with the FAZ. Less than two weeks later, on 19 May 1996, FAZ troops launched an attack on Vitshumbi as part of Operation Mbata, killing an unknown number of civilians accused of supporting the Ngilima militia, including a Pentecostal pastor. After retaking the village, soldiers detained residents inside churches for two days and proceeded to loot the settlement. Other massacres followed, and on 29 May 1996, FAZ troops killed more than 120 civilians in the village of Kibirizi in Bwito Chiefdom. The attack involved the use of heavy weapons, and several houses were set ablaze. In June 1996, FAZ troops carried out another massacre in Kanyabayonga in Lubero Territory, where over one hundred people were killed. Much of the destruction resulted from heavy shelling, which destroyed large sections of the town and burned hundreds of homes. Kanyabayonga had been considered a stronghold of the Ngilima militia, and many of those killed were either members of the militia or civilians suspected of supporting it. Because of the widespread nature of the violence and the absence of reliable records, it is impossible to determine the total number of victims of the massacres that occurred in North Kivu between July 1994 and June 1996. Some estimates suggest that the inter-ethnic conflict caused nearly 1,000 deaths in 1995 alone and displaced around 100,000 people. By June 1996, the number of displaced persons in North Kivu was believed to range between 100,000 and 250,000.

More broadly, observers estimated that between 70,000 and 100,000 people may have died as a result of the ethnic war since 1993. These figures remain highly uncertain, however, due not only to the lack of reliable statistics but also because many people disappeared without a trace during the conflict. One example of these forced disappearances, which was later documented by the United Nations Mapping Team, is the one that happened on 16 August 1995, where two Hunde civilians disappeared while working in their fields near Kitchanga. Their bodies were never recovered. Residents have long suspected Hutu militiamen operating in the area of being responsible. The conflict also had devastating economic and social consequences, as widespread looting was accompanied by violence, and many schools, hospitals, and dispensaries were destroyed or heavily damaged, particularly in Masisi Territory. The war also affected livestock farming, one of the province's most important economic resources. It is estimated that around 80 percent of the region's livestock was stolen, largely by ex-FAR and Interahamwe fighters and by Hutu armed groups linked to MAGRIVI, often with the complicity of certain FAZ units.

=== First Congo War (1996–1997) ===
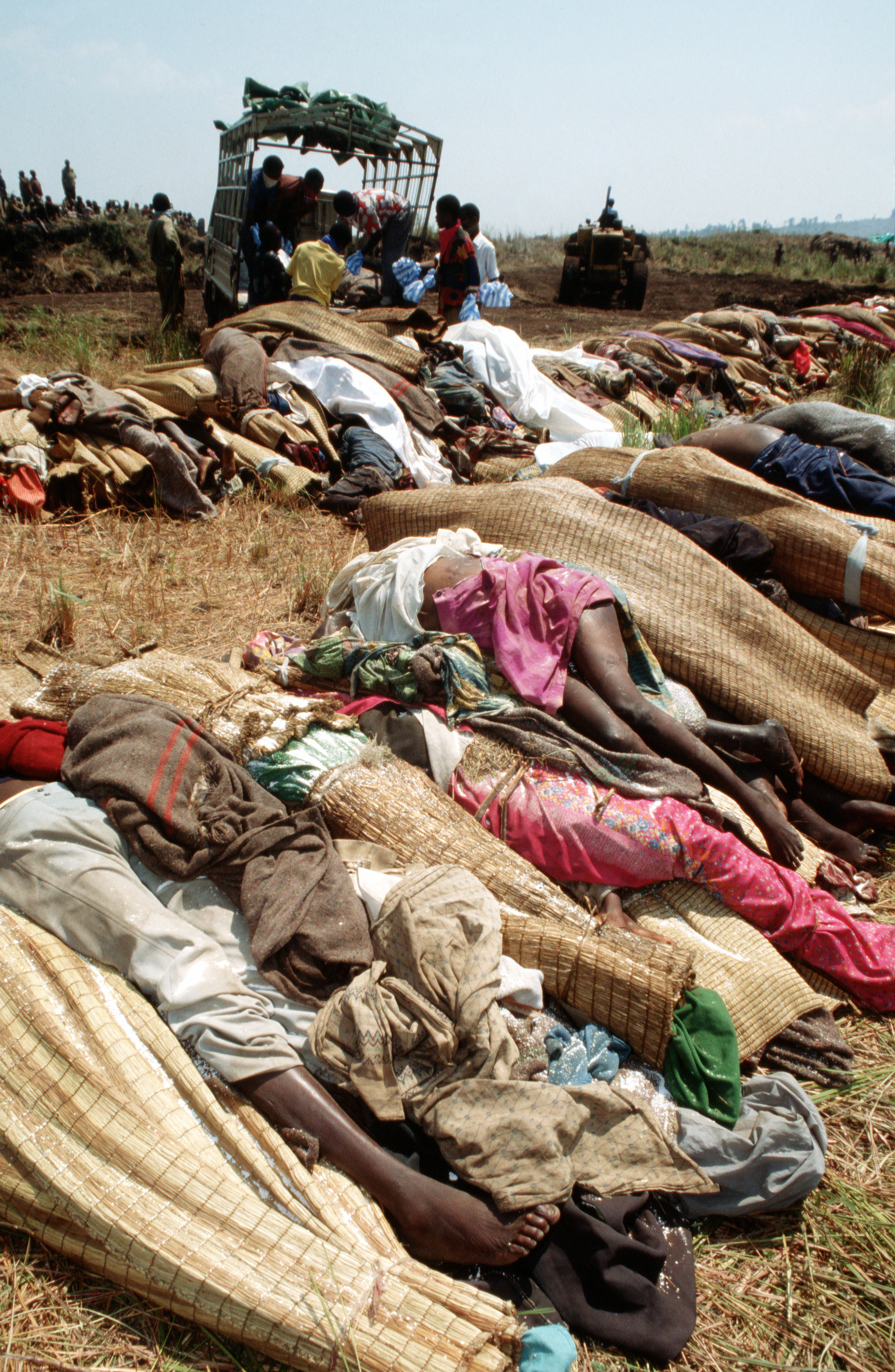
Bodies of Rwandan refugees wrapped in straw mats and blankets line the roadside in October 1994.

The outbreak of the First Congo War was closely tied to the aftermath of the 1994 Rwandan genocide and profoundly destabilized the wider African Great Lakes region. In the wake of the genocide, the RPF defeated the Hutu-dominated government of President Juvénal Habyarimana and took power in Rwanda, but the violence did not end with the RPF's victory, as Rwandan military operations soon extended beyond Rwanda's borders into eastern Zaire, where they pursued Hutu militant groups responsible for the genocide. In the process, however, these incursions were accompanied by widespread violence against Hutu civilians, with a consultant for the United Nations High Commissioner for Refugees (UNHCR), Robert Gersony, documenting that between 5,000 and 10,000 people were being killed each month in mid-1994 alone. At the same time, the massive flight of more than two million Rwandan Hutu refugees into eastern Zaire placed an immense strain on the region. Provinces such as North Kivu and South Kivu experienced rapidly rising tensions, while the government of Zaire under Mobutu proved incapable of effectively responding to the growing humanitarian and security crisis.

By 1996, the Rwandan Patriotic Army (RPA), together with Ugandan forces and the Burundian Armed Forces (FAB), began supporting Banyamulenge and other Tutsi militias operating in eastern Zaire. Belgian legal and political scholar Filip Reyntjens characterizes the First Congo War as the intersection of two concurrent agendas, a legitimate resistance movement by Congolese Tutsi who feared retaliation and the strategic use of this struggle by the Rwandan government to justify the RPA's military intervention in Zaire. From mid-November 1996 onward, soldiers of the Alliance des Forces Démocratiques pour la Libération du Congo (AFDL), supported by the RPA, began pursuing columns of Rwandan refugees, ex-FAR members, and Interahamwe militia fleeing westward across Masisi Territory toward Walikale. The advancing troops gradually overtook the slower sections of these refugee columns, many of whom had taken shelter in makeshift camps scattered across the region. Such camps existed in places including Osso-Banyungu, Kinigi, Katoyi, Kilolirwe, Ngandjo, Nyamitaba, Miandja, Nyaruba, Kirumbu, and Kahira, and were largely populated by survivors from earlier refugee camps such as Mugunga, Kibumba, Kahindo, and Katale. During these operations, AFDL-RPA forces were often assisted by Mayi-Mayi militias. For many of these groups, the campaign offered them an opportunity to exact revenge on Hutu armed factions with whom they had been fighting for several years. On 19 November 1996, Mayi-Mayi fighters allied with the AFDL, supported by AFDL-RPA artillery, attacked the village of Ngungu, and the attack resulted in the indiscriminate killing of an unknown number of refugees and members of the ex-FAR/Interahamwe. The total number of victims remains uncertain, though several sources suggest that the death toll may have reached several hundred.

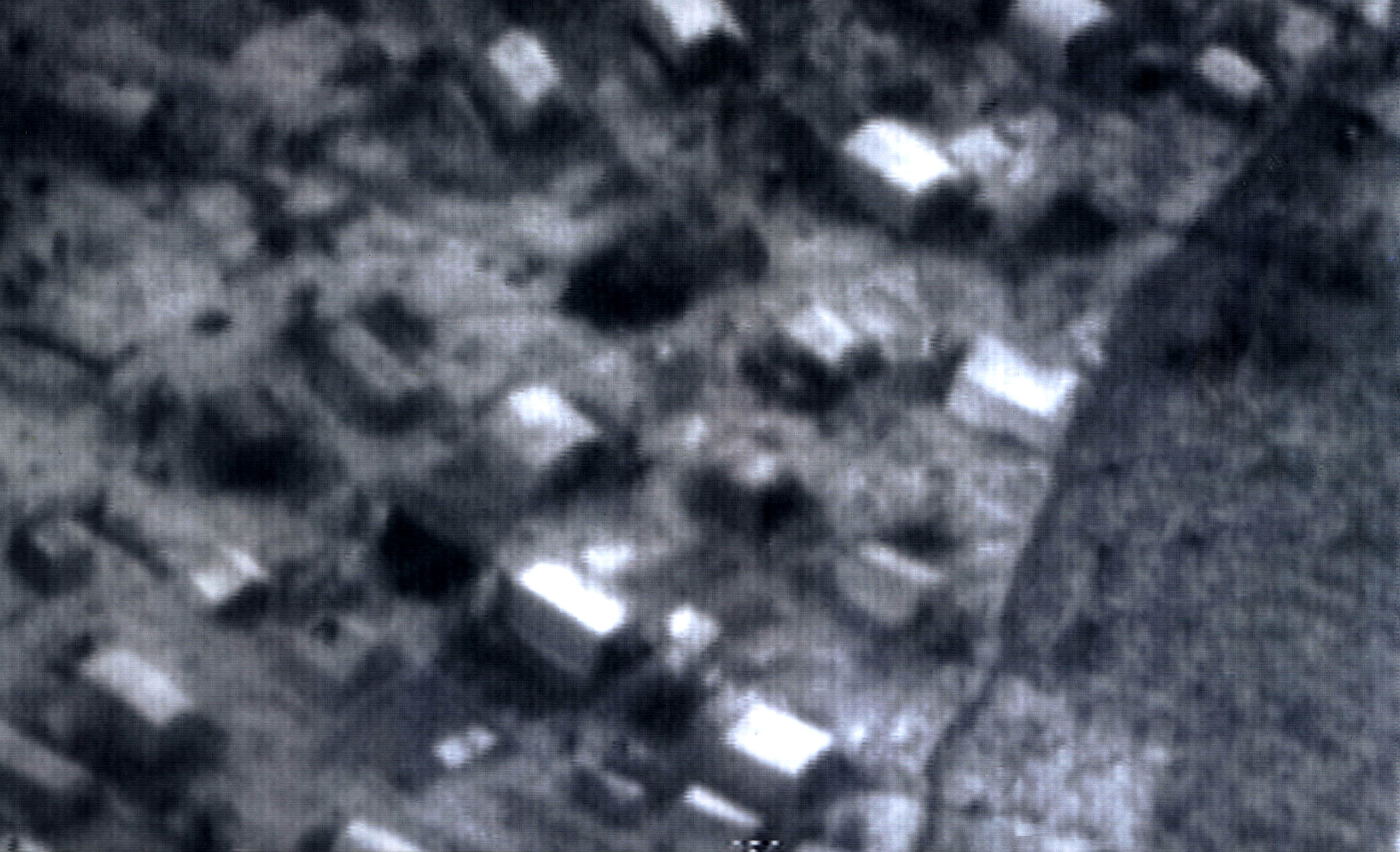
Zairean refugees in Sake in 1996

Other killings followed throughout November, and in the latter half of the month, AFDL-RPA units attacked a makeshift camp near the Osso-Banyungu farm. After exchanging fire with ex-FAR and Interahamwe fighters stationed in the camp, the Hutu militants quickly retreated. AFDL-RPA troops then entered the camp, where dozens of refugees, many of them women and children, were killed. Zairian civilians accused by the soldiers of hiding or assisting refugees were also executed. Shortly afterward, eyewitnesses reported seeing between twenty and one hundred bodies at the site. During the week of 9 December 1996, AFDL-RPA soldiers surrounded a makeshift refugee camp in the village of Mbeshe Mbeshe, in the Katoyi sector. At approximately five o'clock in the morning, they opened fire on the camp's inhabitants, and several hundred Rwandan refugees were reportedly killed in the attack. Some sources indicate that displaced Zairian civilians sheltering in the camp also died. Elsewhere in the region, many refugees, especially survivors from the Kahindo and Katale camps, had settled in Bashali Chiefdom around early November 1996, and by about 18 November, AFDL-RPA forces attacked their makeshift camp at Rukwi. In the weeks and months that followed, survivors attempting to flee the area were repeatedly hunted down and killed, though the total number of victims remains unknown. In late November 1996, AFDL-RPA units killed around fifty civilians in the village of Miandja in Masisi Territory. Among the dead were approximately forty Rwandan refugees and ten Hutu Congolese. In April of that year, AFDL-RPA forces attacked groups of refugees who had settled at a site known as Karunda in the town of Kirumbu, as well as on the Nyabura plantation in the Bashali-Mokoto groupement. On or about 22 April 1997, AFDL-RPA units killed fifty-three refugees in a school in the village of Humule, near Karuba, as the victims had been attempting to reach a UNHCR transit center in Karuba, where they hoped to arrange their repatriation to Rwanda. Witnesses later reported that some of the women among the victims were raped before being killed. Even after the war's final stages, violence against refugees persisted. On 29 May 1997, AFDL-RPA units killed four refugees, including a child and an employee of the international humanitarian organization Save the Children, in Karuba. They were part of a group traveling toward the UNHCR transit center there, again seeking repatriation to Rwanda.

=== Second Congo War (1998–2003) ===
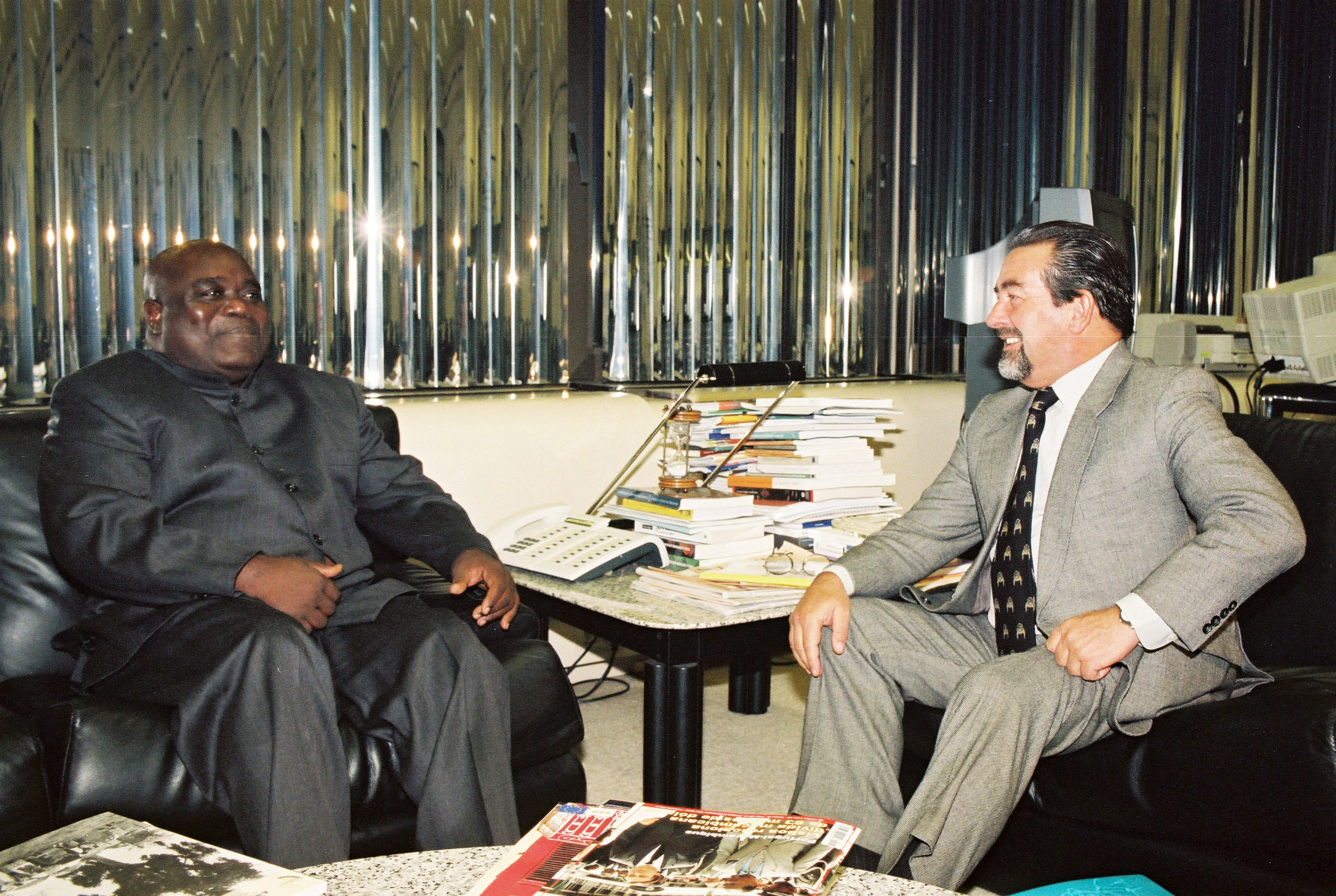
Visit of President Laurent-Désiré Kabila to João de Deus Pinheiro, the European Commissioner for Relations with Parliament, Culture, and Audiovisual, to discuss the armed conflict raging in the country, November 1998.

The Second Congo War began in 1998, following the breakdown of relations between President Laurent-Désiré Kabila and his former partners, Rwanda and Uganda. After coming to power with their support during the First Congo War, Kabila increasingly accused both governments of interfering in Congolese sovereignty and of having ambitions to overthrow him. At the same time, allegations emerged that the United States had indirectly supported Rwanda during this period, with reports suggesting that American assistance included military training through the Rwanda Interagency Assessment Team (RIAT), which was allegedly motivated in part by strategic interests in the DRC's vast mineral resources. Other accusations implicated American officials and organizations, including Roger Winter of the U.S. Committee for Refugees and Immigrants, in supporting insurgent networks in the region. Tensions escalated when Kabila dismissed Rwandan General James Kabarebe from his position as Chief of Staff of the Forces armées congolaises (FAC) and ordered all Rwandan troops to withdraw from the country. The decision triggered a swift and violent response, with Rwanda and Uganda soon backing the creation of a new rebel movement, the Rassemblement Congolais pour la Démocratie (RCD). On 2 August 1998, mutinous elements within FAC, supported by Rwandan, Ugandan, and Burundian forces, declared their rebellion from the city of Goma. The RCD and its allies quickly seized control of large portions of eastern and northern Congo, capturing territory across North and South Kivu, Orientale Province, northern Katanga, and parts of Équateur Province. However, their advance toward the capital, Kinshasa, and the western province of Bas-Congo was ultimately halted when Angola and Zimbabwe intervened militarily in support of Kabila's government. The country became divided between rival political and military blocs, with Kabila's government, supported by troops from Zimbabwe, Angola, Namibia, Chad, and Sudan, retaining control over the western and central regions, while the eastern territories fell largely under the authority of the RCD and its armed wing, the Armée Nationale Congolaise (ANC), which operated with the backing of Rwandan, Ugandan, and Burundian forces. In response to the growing strength of this eastern coalition, Kabila sought allies among various irregular forces and forged alliances with local militias, most prominently the Mayi-Mayi, as well as with Hutu rebel groups from neighboring Rwanda and Burundi such as the Burundian Forces pour la Défense de la Démocratie (FDD) and the Rwandan Armée de Libération du Rwanda (ALiR).

While maintaining control over significant portions of Orientale Province, Kampala supported the creation of a separate rebel movement, the Mouvement pour la Libération du Congo (MLC), led by Jean-Pierre Bemba, to administer the territories under Ugandan influence in Équateur. Growing strategic and political disagreements between Uganda and Rwanda soon deepened divisions within the rebel camp itself, and the RCD fractured into rival factions, most notably the Rwanda-aligned Rassemblement Congolais pour la Démocratie–Goma (RCD-Goma) and the Uganda-aligned RCD-ML. Despite their control over major urban centers in eastern Congo, RCD-Goma and its allied forces, including the ANC, the RPA, and the FAB, struggled to establish effective authority in rural areas. Their dependence on the Banyamulenge and their close military relationship with Rwanda fueled resentment among other ethnic groups in the region. In response, many communities increasingly turned to self-defense militias, particularly the Mayi-Mayi, whose decentralized, often ethnically based organization enabled them to resist external military forces.

Violence against civilians became notable, and on 25 February 1999, ANC-RPA forces attacked the marketplace in Lukweti, in Masisi Territory, opening fire on civilians and killing 45 people. Several months later, on 12 August 1999, the same forces killed at least 44 civilians in the village of Miano, also in Masisi Territory. Most of the victims were women and children belonging to the Tembo ethnic group, and many were reportedly targeted based on their ethnic identity. During the attack, soldiers also mutilated an unknown number of people and destroyed the local health center. On 5 February 2000, ANC-RPA forces killed at least 30 in the village of Kilambo in Masisi Territory. A local nongovernmental organization later identified 27 of the victims, although witnesses reported that additional killings occurred in nearby areas at the same time, bringing the estimated death toll to nearly 60. Other armed groups also carried out attacks against civilians, and in January 2000, ALiR fighters killed around 100 civilians in the village of Luke and the surrounding region, accusing them of collaborating with ANC-RPA forces. Many of the victims were reportedly killed with machetes or shot, and the village was subsequently looted. Later that year, on 9 July 2000, ALiR forces attacked a camp for displaced persons in Sake, killing between 34 and 42 civilians. Most of the victims, many of whom were women and children, belonged to the Hunde and Tembo ethnic groups.

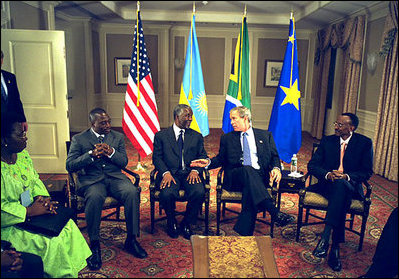
George W. Bush meets with Joseph Kabila (left), Thabo Mbeki of South Africa (center), and Paul Kagame of Rwanda (right) at the Waldorf Astoria New York.

After the assassination of President Laurent-Désiré Kabila on 16 January 2001, power passed rapidly to his son, Joseph Kabila, who was sworn in as president within days. From the outset of his presidency, he sought to reduce the intensity of the war and promote national reconciliation by supporting the Inter-Congolese Dialogue (ICD), which brought together the government, rebel factions, political opposition, and civil society representatives to negotiate an end to the conflict. In March 2001, the United Nations Mission in the Democratic Republic of the Congo (MONUC) deployed across key conflict zones to oversee implementation of the Lusaka Ceasefire Agreement. However, armed violence continued, particularly in North Kivu and South Kivu, where militias such as the Mayi-Mayi and foreign-backed groups including the FDD, ALiR, and the ANC remained active. The ICD convened on 25 February 2002 in Sun City, and on 19 April 2002, Joseph Kabila and Jean-Pierre Bemba signed a preliminary power-sharing agreement. However, the deal was contested by the RCD-Goma and opposition parties such as the Union for Democracy and Social Progress (UDPS). Further diplomatic progress followed when the Congolese government and Rwanda concluded a peace agreement in Pretoria on 30 July 2002. Rwanda committed to withdrawing its forces from Congolese territory, while Kinshasa agreed to disarm and repatriate Hutu militias such as the FDLR. On 6 September 2002, a comparable agreement with Uganda was signed in Luanda, which focusing on the withdrawal of Ugandan troops and stabilization of Ituri Province.

By late 2002, foreign forces from Rwanda, Uganda, Zimbabwe, Angola, and Namibia had begun leaving the DRC. On 17 December 2002, Congolese stakeholders concluded the Global and All-Inclusive Agreement (Accord global et inclusif) in Pretoria, which established a transitional power-sharing government and set out plans to merge rival armed groups into a national army. The agreement was ratified by the ICD on 1 April 2003 in Sun City, and the transitional institutions were formally inaugurated on 30 June 2003, which then marked an end to the war.

=== Post-Congo Wars ===
==== The rise of the National Congress for the Defence of the People ====
The three-year political transition that concluded with the 2006 national elections revealed serious internal rifts within the RCD. Leaders within the movement strongly disagreed about whether they should remain involved in the transition process, as many believed that Joseph Kabila's government was negotiating dishonestly. Former members of the RCD feared that integration into the new political order would weaken their political leverage and economic privileges. At the same time, members of the Rwandophone community feared they might face possible discrimination and persecution in the post-war order. These anxieties proved partially warranted. In the 2006 elections, the RCD won only a limited number of seats in the national legislature and also lost control of the North Kivu governorship. Signs of fragmentation had appeared as early as August 2003, when three senior military officers deserted the movement, including General Laurent Nkunda, a Tutsi from Rutshuru Territory. Later that December, Nkunda and several RCD leaders created a new quasi-political group called the Synergie nationale pour la paix et la concorde (SNPC). The Rwandan government, driven by economic, security, and political considerations, was unwilling to relinquish its influence in Kivu Kivu and offered backing to these dissident officers, and their partnership later became the foundation for two rebel organizations that would dominate security dynamics in North Kivu for years such as the Congrès National pour la Défense du Peuple (CNDP), active between 2006 and 2009, and subsequently the March 23 Movement (M23). Tensions between RCD officers and government loyalists had already been escalating in Bukavu in early 2004, and in May of that year, Nkunda launched an attack on the city, claiming he was protecting Bukavu's Tutsi population from an impending genocide. Although elements of the national army did target Tutsi residents, particularly summarily executing at least fifteen Banyamulenge civilians in May 2004, there was no evidence of a genocide in preparation. Nkunda's fighters acted under a combination of genuine fear and calculated manipulation. After several days of occupying Bukavu, they withdrew under heavy international pressure. The siege produced severe human rights violations, with thousands of Tutsi fleeing into Rwanda, many assisted by the United Nations, while Nkunda's troops looted the main market and carried out dozens of rapes. The attack nearly derailed the fragile political transition underway in the country. Nkunda benefited from Rwandan assistance and also from alliances with dissatisfied participants in the transition. Among the most significant was Eugène Serufuli Ngayabaseka, who remained governor of North Kivu throughout the transition period. Serufuli became Nkunda's most important, yet unpredictable, local partner. His political party provided resources, including fuel and vehicles, for the Bukavu offensive, but his support was not simply an act of solidarity, as Serufuli also viewed Nkunda and the SNPC as potential rivals. In January 2004, he therefore created his own movement, known as la rwandophonie, which aimed to promote a political alliance between Hutus and Tutsis and to advocate a more federal structure for the Congolese state. In practice, the initiative remained mostly symbolic and quickly faded. As the transition reshaped the country's politics, different actors tested new alliances and strategies. All of them operated within the context of a weak Congolese state that failed to build an effective and impartial administrative system, and, instead, political and military elites were absorbed into patronage networks.

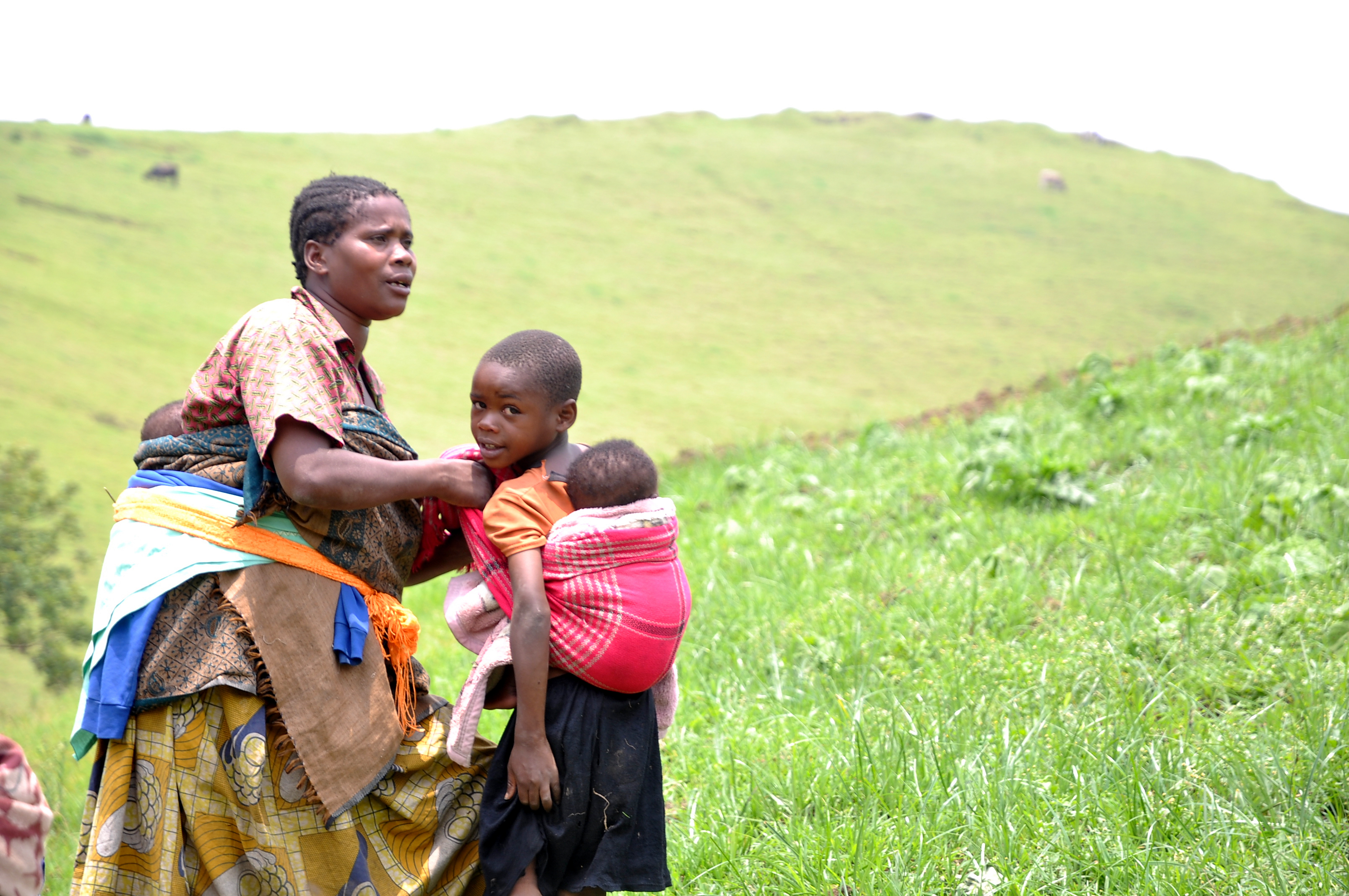
War-displaced family on the hills of Lushebere (pictured in 2015)

The integration of militia forces into the national army, known as brassage, had mixed results, as the process dismantled many of the old chains of command and demobilized more than 100,000 soldiers. Yet it failed to instill discipline or create stable livelihoods for former fighters. Because of limited resources and poor follow-up, fewer than half of those demobilized received meaningful reintegration support such as training, scholarships, or alternative employment. Meanwhile, the crisis intensified, with Nkunda consistently at its center, and in August 2004, the massacre of Tutsi refugees at the Gatumba Refugee Camp in Burundi also worsened the fears of the Tutsi community. The Burundian rebel group Forces nationales de libération (FNL) claimed responsibility, though questions remain about who assisted them. The victims were almost entirely Banyamulenge. By 2006, after orchestrating the defection of several brigades from the national army, Nkunda launched the CNDP rebellion, and the movement relied heavily on mid-ranking Tutsi officers who had previously served in the RCD. Based in the highlands of Masisi Territory and Rutshuru Territory, the CNDP claimed to defend the rights and security of the Tutsi population, but its claims were undermined by numerous abuses committed against local civilians. It also had ambitious political goals, with some of its leaders advocating a federal system for the Congo, while others reportedly favored outright secession of the eastern provinces. The CNDP's military strength depended heavily on tight networks and strong loyalty among its Tutsi commanders, but its ethnic identity was its greatest weakness. For many Congolese, it appeared more like an extension of Rwandan irredentist ambitions than a domestic political movement, a perception that became evident in the early stages of the rebellion. Several high-ranking Hutu officers within the CNDP defected, partly under pressure from Serufuli and other RCD leaders who had by then aligned themselves with the government in Kinshasa. In early 2006, the Hutu commanders of both the 81st and 83rd brigades, Colonels Smith and Rugayi, abandoned Nkunda and joined the FARDC and took hundreds of soldiers with them. In response to these losses, the CNDP increasingly relied on recruits from Rwanda and on forced recruitment in local schools, but these practices weakened the movement's internal cohesion and also damaged its reputation among the local population. Despite repeated rounds of negotiations between the CNDP and the government in Kinshasa, violence continued to erupt periodically. In 2007, after heavy fighting near Sake, the CNDP agreed to another integration arrangement known as mixage. Under the agreement, Nkunda's forces would be integrated with the FARDC to form six mixed brigades. A key condition, however, was that these units would remain deployed within a limited area near the CNDP's stronghold in Masisi Territory. The agreement soon collapsed. Before the end of the year, the government launched a major military offensive against Nkunda. Once again, however, the campaign ended in a humiliating defeat for the FARDC forces.

==== The Goma peace initiative and Operation Amani Leo ====
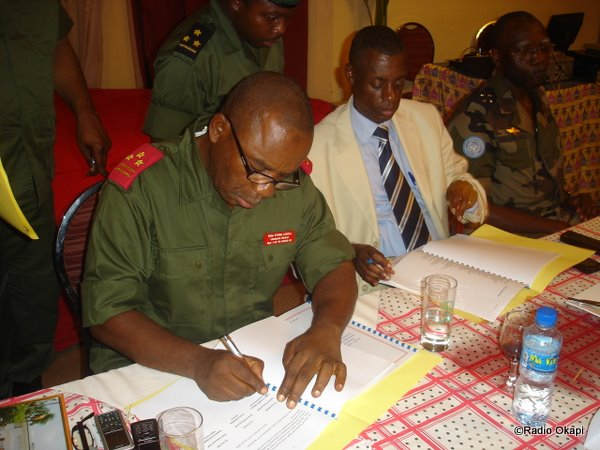
Congolese General Didier Etumba and Rwandan General James Kabarebe assess the results of Operation Kimia II in Matadi, January 2010.

These renewed hostilities triggered the "rapid mobilization of at least a dozen more armed groups in the province, most notably a cluster of militias, including members of Hunde, Tembo, Nyanga, Nande and Hutu communities, that dubbed themselves PARECO". These groups emerged largely in response to the worsening security situation, as communities organized militias to defend themselves against the expanding CNDP, and at the same time, several armed factions sought to secure their political leverage in anticipation of a future power-sharing settlement. This wave of militarization reversed the fragile progress that had followed the 2002 peace agreement, though Mayi-Mayi militias were responsible for part of the violence; the deeper political crisis was closely connected to unresolved tensions involving Rwanda, the FDLR, and the CNDP. To address the escalating conflict, the Congolese government, with backing from international donors, convened a major peace initiative in early 2008 known as the Goma Conference, officially titled the Conference on Peace, Security and Development of North and South Kivu (Conférence sur la Paix, la Sécurité et le Développement du Nord et du Sud Kivu), and it lasted several weeks and brought together representatives from numerous armed factions and community groups. The conference ended with the signing of the Actes d'Engagement ("articles of engagement"), under which participating militias pledged to end hostilities and integrate their fighters into the FARDC. 22 armed groups from the Kivu region endorsed the agreement, although some of them had little real military presence. Despite the initial optimism surrounding the conference, the arrangement soon began to unravel, as both the Congolese government and the CNDP leadership showed limited commitment to implementing the agreement, and military tensions soon resurfaced. By October 2008, CNDP forces had launched a major offensive that nearly resulted in the capture of Goma.

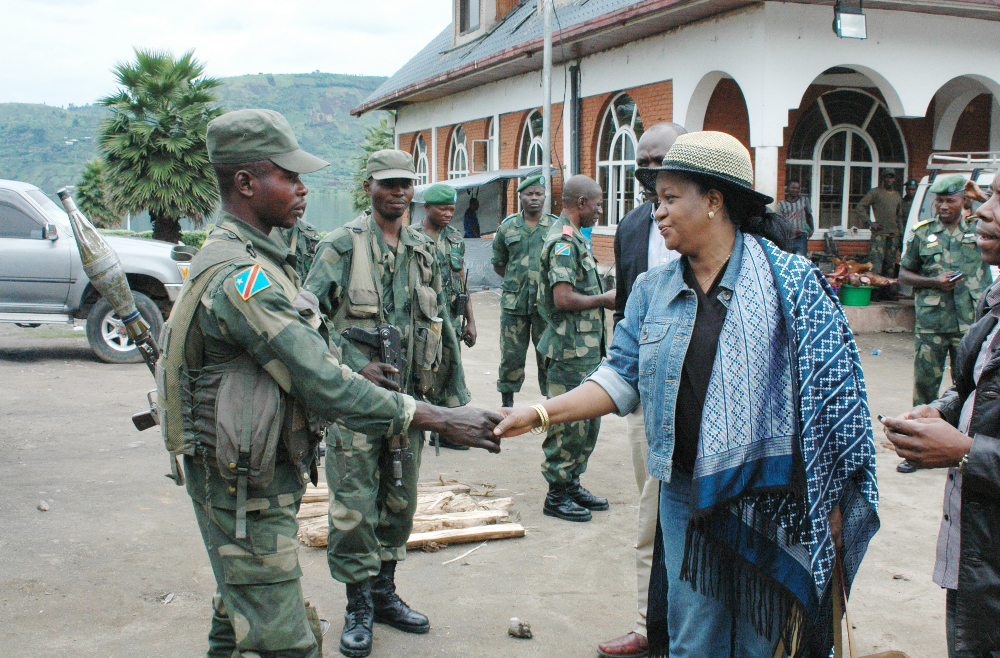
Zainab Bangura, a Sierra Leonean who served as the second United Nations Special Representative on Sexual Violence in Conflict at the level of Under-Secretary-General of the United Nations from 2012 to 2017, meets members of the FARDC in 2013 in Bweremana.

After several years of unsuccessful military campaigns against the rebels, the Congolese government opened negotiations with Rwanda, which had come under increasing international scrutiny after United Nations reports alleged its support for Nkunda. By the end of 2008, the two governments had reached a confidential agreement, whose full details were never publicly revealed. Under the arrangement, Rwanda agreed to arrest Nkunda and assist in integrating CNDP fighters into the FARDC, while the Congolese government allowed Rwandan troops to enter eastern Congo to conduct operations against the FDLR. In January 2009, Congolese and Rwandan forces launched Operation Umoja Wetu ("our unity"), which targeted the FDLR, and shortly afterward, the Congolese government and the CNDP concluded the March 23 Agreement that formally integrated the rebel movement into the FARDC. The agreement established a 16-point roadmap for peace, including provisions for amnesty, the integration of armed groups into the security forces, reforms in the defense sector, and measures to facilitate the return of refugees. Compared with earlier peace initiatives, the March 23 Agreement initially appeared relatively effective, and within several months, thousands of fighters from the CNDP and other militias joined the FARDC. Operation Umoja Wetu was soon followed by Operation Kimia II ("Peace II") in March 2009, and later by Operation Amani Leo ("peace today") in January 2010, as FARDC forces continued their military campaigns against the FDLR and other remaining armed groups. Altogether, more than 16,000 combatants were incorporated into the FARDC, including approximately 5,500 former CNDP fighters and 4,000 members of PARECO. These operations dealt a significant blow to the FDLR. Between 2009 and 2012, more than 4,500 FDLR combatants returned to Rwanda through United Nations repatriation programs, which represented over 70 percent of the movement's estimated strength. However, the campaigns also produced serious humanitarian repercussions, as the fighting displaced nearly one million civilians in 2009 alone, and the integration of CNDP fighters into the FARDC remained incomplete. Many former CNDP commanders maintained parallel chains of command, which weakened military discipline and obstructed meaningful reforms within the army. Several ex-CNDP officers also secured influential positions within the FARDC hierarchy, particularly within the Amani Leo operations. The most notable figure was General Bosco Ntaganda, who served as deputy commander of the operations and later became one of the most controversial military figures in the region. He was later indicted by the International Criminal Court (ICC) for war crimes and crimes against humanity. By 2012, the fragile cooperation between the DRC and Rwanda had broken down. As the Congolese government attempted to dismantle the networks of former CNDP commanders and integrate their fighters more fully into the national army, Rwanda was widely reported to have supported a new rebellion led by Ntaganda, known as the March 23 Movement. The rise of M23 signaled the beginning of another major phase of conflict in eastern Congo.

==== Post–Goma peace process armed groups in Masisi Territory ====
One of the armed groups active in Masisi Territory is Nyatura, a majority Hutu militia which was founded in 2010 in nearby Kalehe Territory in South Kivu. Another active group is the Alliance of Patriots for a Free and Sovereign Congo (APCLS), a majority Hunde Mayi-Mayi. In July 2014, an offensive in the Masisi and Walikale Territories by the FARDC and MONUSCO liberated 20 rebel controlled towns. As of 2023, the majority Tutsi M23 has taken control of portions of the territory during its recent ongoing offensive. The Nyatura and APCLS militias are currently in a coalition to resist the M23.

== Economy ==
=== Agriculture ===
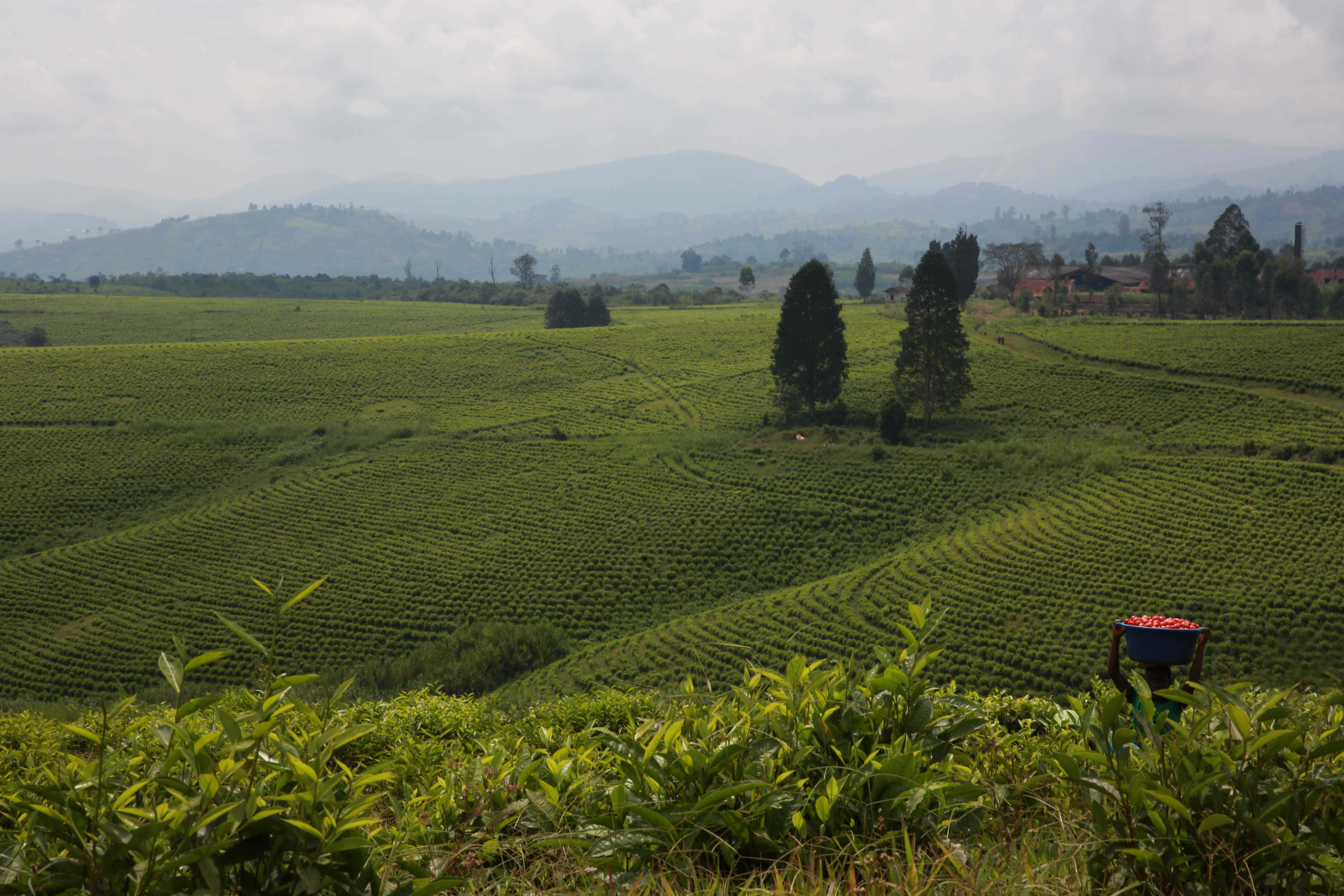
A terraced tea plantation along the Nyanzale-Kitchanga axis

A very large portion of the population practices agriculture. The fertile soils and favorable climate enable the cultivation of numerous food crops, including beans, soybeans, maize, colocasia, peanuts, potatoes, sweet potatoes, sorghum, bananas, cassava, and sugarcane. Beans are grown across the territory, with particularly high production in Bashali Chiefdom and the Katoyi sector. Approximately 85% of the harvest is sold commercially, 5% is used for household consumption, and 10% is reserved as seed for future planting. Cassava is consumed in various forms, notably bugali and chikwangue. In addition, the territory produces several industrial crops such as coffee, tea, cinchona, pyrethrum, cotton, and oil palm, which have historically supported agro-industrial processing. Most of these crops are cultivated for both consumption and trade, with roughly 80–90% marketed and about 10% kept as seed stock.

Agricultural product	Estimated production volume
Beans	41,875 tons
Potatoes	94,991 tons
Sweet potatoes	88,932 tons
Sorghum	8,317 tons
Peanuts	575 tons
Cassava	73,252 tons
Colocasia	110,508 tons
Bananas	Optional cultivation

In the potato sector, the principal agricultural cooperatives include COOAPAKA, COOPADEKO, COOAMA, and COOAPARU, which produce both table potatoes and seed potatoes, mainly of the Kinigi, Penape, and Kirundo varieties.

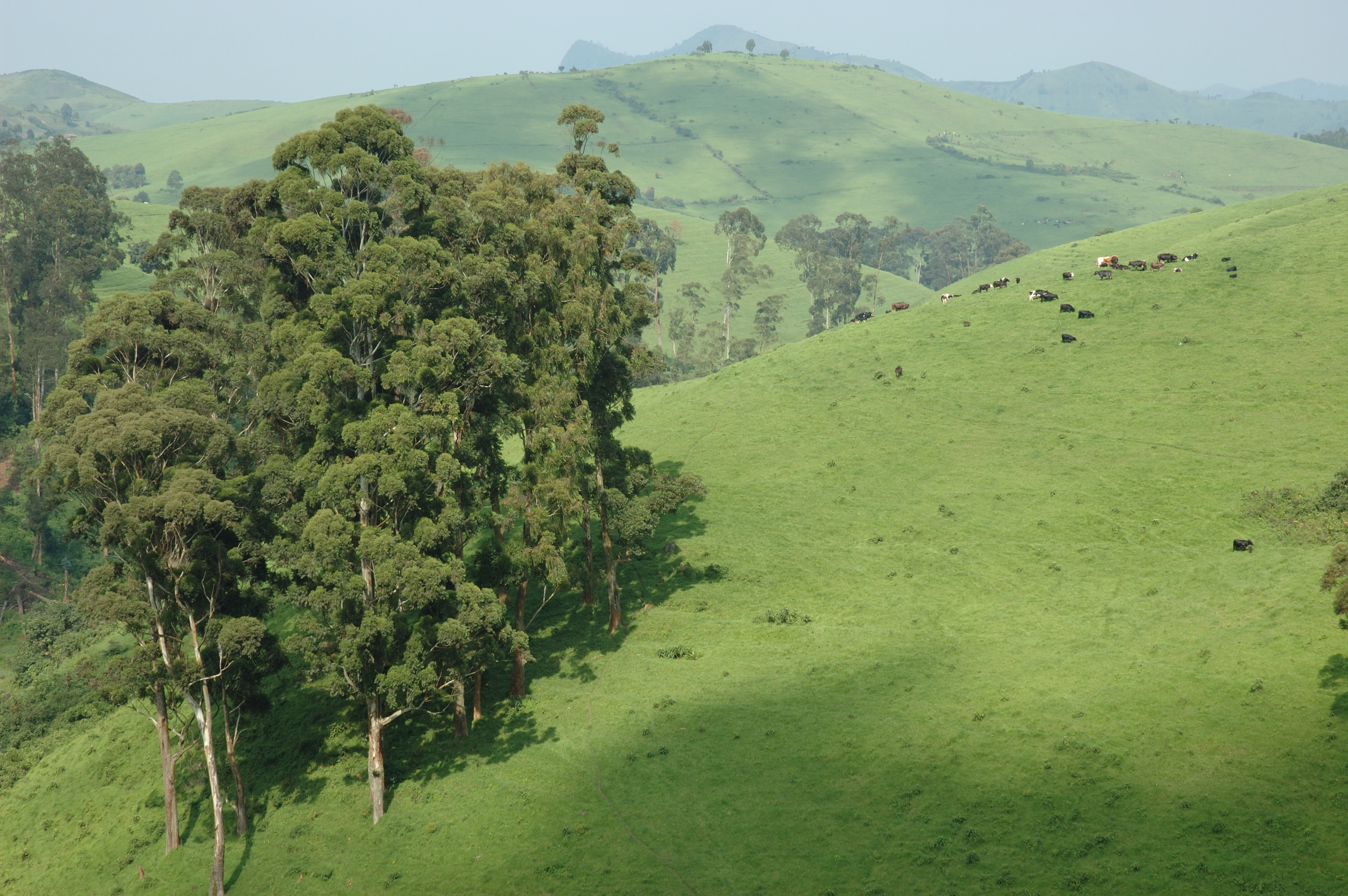
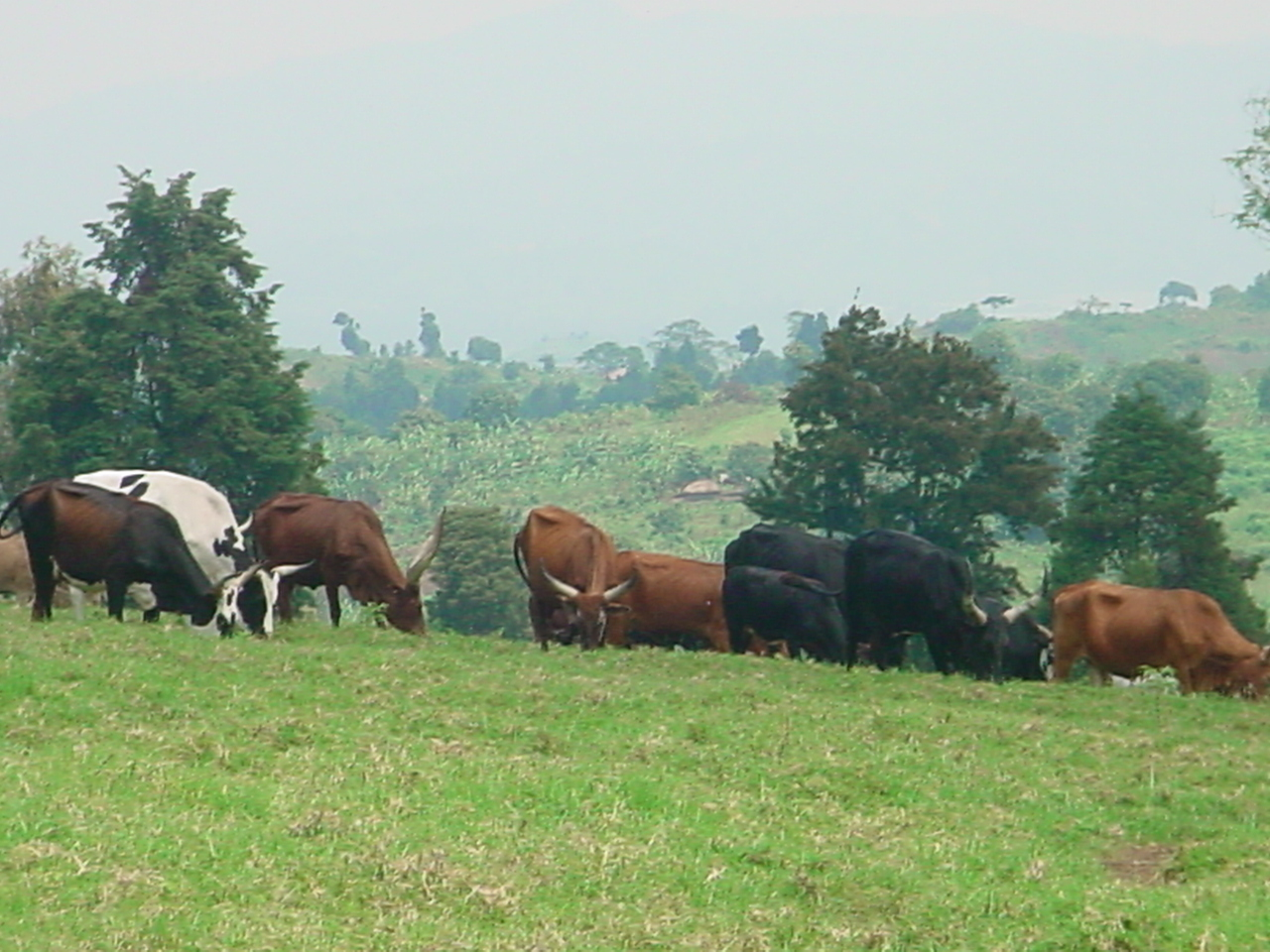
The wealth of the territory is the cattle that graze the open hills.

Animal husbandry is widely practiced, with farmers raising small livestock such as goats, sheep, pigs, and poultry, as well as cattle, which represent the most important form of large livestock. The development of this sector has been made possible by the extensive natural grazing lands covering nearly three-quarters of Masisi Territory. Historically, before colonial rule, the local population depended on agriculture, fishing, hunting, and small-scale livestock breeding. The introduction of modern cattle ranching occurred during the colonial period and expanded further with immigration, particularly from Rwanda. Records from 1957 indicate that 18,659 head of cattle and other large livestock were present in North Kivu.

Masisi Territory is the country's largest producer of dairy products, with annual production estimated at 150,000 kilograms of cheese and approximately 8.22 billion liters of milk. Near Mweso, there is a tea processing plant as part of a 450 hectare tea plantation known as JTN. Beginning in 1975, Belgian priests introduced a cheese-making tradition, and small farmers in the area produce Goma cheese, a Gouda-like cow cheese that is the only significant cheese production in the whole DRC. Several local small and medium-sized enterprises also process the milk into dairy products. Among them are the Lusheberhe, Kilolirwe, and Mokoto Monastery cheese factories. Besides cheese production, these enterprises have the capacity to manufacture butter, cooking cream oil, fermented milk (mashanza, which is considered beneficial for children and infants), and nutritional milk products for children. The dairy sector is also supported by the Association coopérative des groupements d'éleveurs du Nord-Kivu (ACOGENOKI), a cooperative that brings together livestock breeders. The organization plays an important role in collecting, processing, and marketing milk, operating a modular dairy-processing facility in Luhonga, where several dairy products are produced.

=== Fishing, tourism and mineral deposits ===
Fishing is practiced artisanally in Bweremana by communities living along the shore of Lake Kivu.

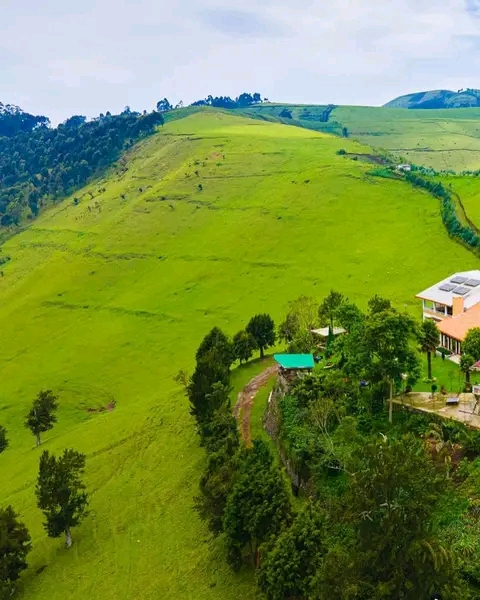
The rolling green hills of Masisi Territory

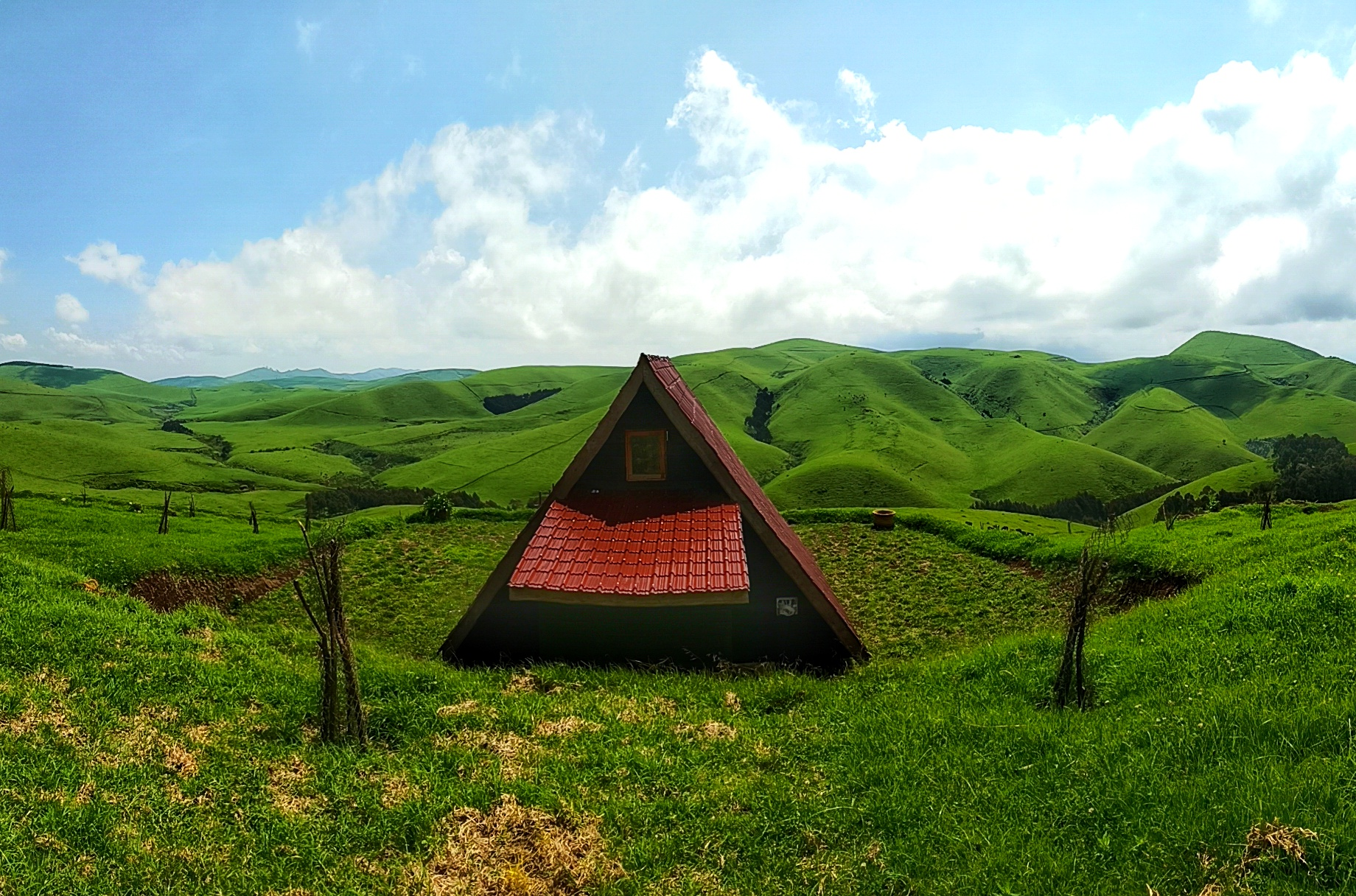
Guest accommodation in Rushengo, Masisi Territory

Masisi Territory also contains several natural and tourist sites, including waterfalls, saline and thermal springs, Sake Bay on Lake Kivu, Kaancha Bay, unique rock formations, the Muranga-Kirotshe escarpment, and the small lakes of Ndaala, Mbita, Mbalukira, and Bashali-Mokoto. The eastern portion of the territory is part of Virunga National Park, and contains the active volcano Nyamuragira and its satellite Rumoka. Notable wildlife species found in the territory include monkeys (locally called Lusula), elephants, birds such as white geese, as well as baboons, gorillas, chimpanzees, and various rodents.

Tourist site	Location
Saltwater springs	Luhinsi
Saltwater springs	Kitobo/Mulamba
Saltwater springs	Kwiriba/Bushuhi
Saltwater springs	Maliba/Lwama
Saltwater springs	Kisuma
Hot springs (known in Swahili as "Mayi ya Moto")	Bitaata/Bulinda
Sake Bay (Lake Kivu)	Sake
Kaancha/Tutsitutsi Bay	Lake Kivu area
Mpumo Bay	Pinga
Bulinda Rock	Nyamaboko II groupement
Bitonga Rock	Mushanga groupement
Muranga Escarpment	Kirotshe
Muhongozi/Kiusha Waterfall	—
Lubale Waterfall	Bashali Kaembe groupement
Wau Waterfall	Bapfuna groupement
Kautu Waterfall	Banyungu groupement
Karunda Waterfall	Bapfuna groupement
Nyamushindi Waterfall	Banyungu groupement
Ndalaa, Mbita, Mbalukira, and Lukulu Lakes	Bashali-Mokoto groupement

Mineral deposits include columbite–tantalite, tourmaline, cassiterite, amethyst, and ametrine, which are mainly extracted through artisanal mining, especially in Rubaya and Ngungu.

=== Economic actors ===
More than a thousand economic actors operate within Masisi Territory. Over half of these businesses are concentrated in artisanal mining activities in Rubaya and Ngungu. Their operations largely involve the manual extraction of minerals such as columbite–tantalite, cassiterite, tourmaline, and amethyst. In addition, retail trade is carried out across the territory's main settlements.

Economic operator	Sector or activity	Sources
SMB (Société Minière de Busunzu, formerly MHI)	Artisanal mineral exploitation	
SAKIMA (Société Aurifère du Kivu et du Maniema)	Artisanal mineral exploitation	
COOPERAMA (Coopérative des Exploitants Artisanaux Miniers de Masisi)	Artisanal mining	
COMICO (Coopérative des Exploitants Miniers de Masisi)	Artisanal mineral extraction	
ANMK (Association des Négociants Miniers du Kivu)	Mineral trade/artisanal mining sector	
Rhema Flour Mill (Minotérie de Rhema)	Agro-processing (maize flour production)	
Lushebere Cheese Factory (Fromagérie de Lushebere)	Dairy production	
Kilolirwe Cheese Factory (Fromagérie de Kilolirwe)	Dairy production	
Mokoto Monastery Cheese Factory (Fromagérie de monastère de Mokoto)	Dairy production	
COOPEC–MECRECO	Financial services (savings and credit)	
IBB Station	Fuel distribution	

== Infrastructure ==
=== Transport ===
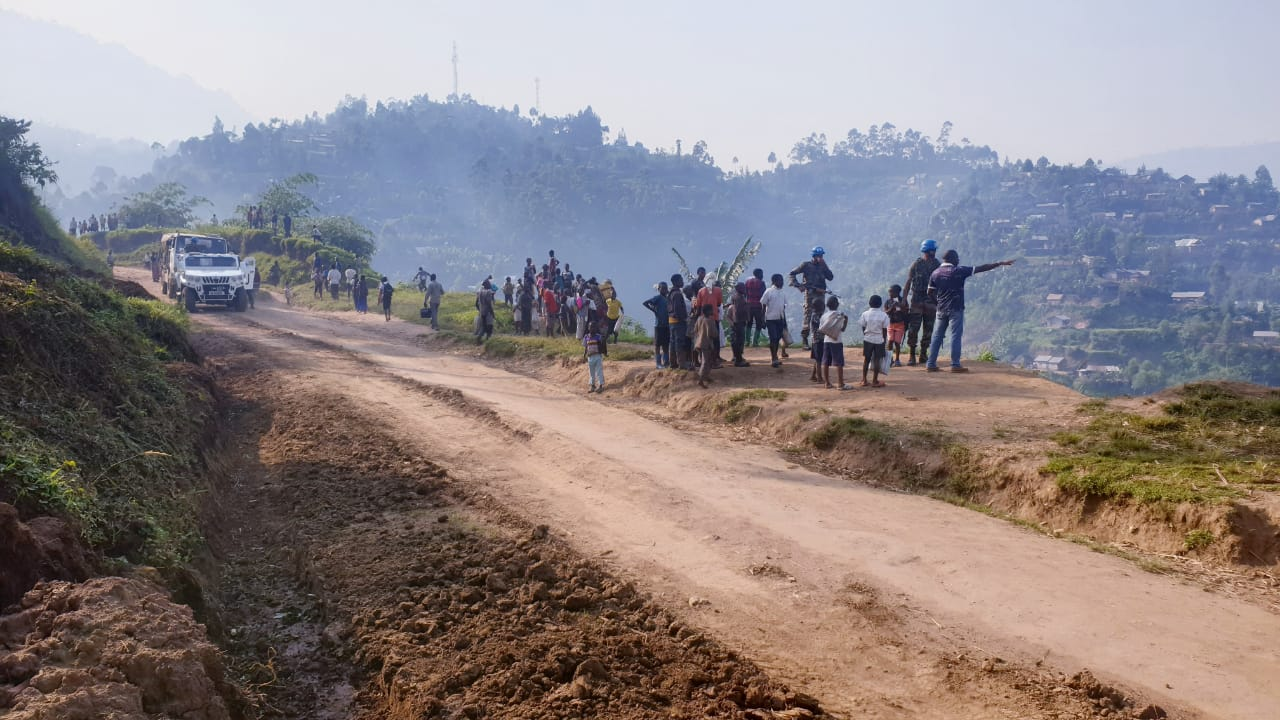
MONUSCO peacekeepers interact with members of a local community along a road in Masisi Territory.

Transportation relies mainly on road networks, with most goods entering or leaving the territory transported by road. The territory can also be accessed by water in its southern part, within Bahunde Chiefdom, particularly through Bweremana. The principal route linking the territory to other regions is National Road No. 2 (RN2), which connects Masisi Territory with Kalehe Territory in the South Kivu province and with the city of Goma. Additional roads connect Masisi with the neighboring Walikale Territory and Rutshuru Territory. Masisi Territory has an estimated road network of approximately 1,889 km, of which about 1,289 km consists of agricultural access roads.

==== Main interprovincial roads ====
Several major roads provide interprovincial connections within the territory, particularly toward Nyabiondo and Mweso in the northern and northeastern areas.

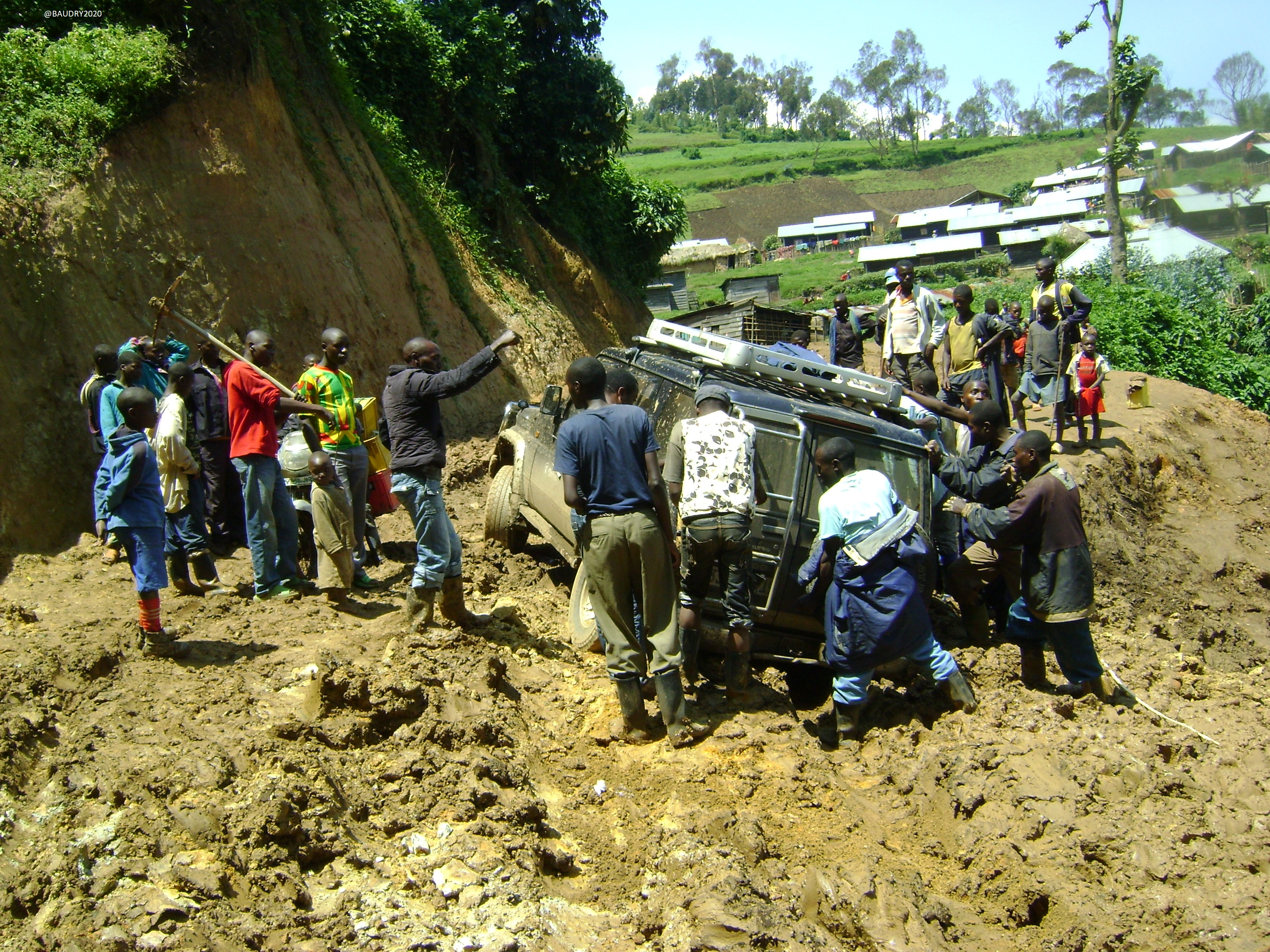
Local residents assist in freeing a vehicle stuck in deep mud along the Masisi road

- 80 km Sake–Masisi–Nyabiondo axis: the road has not been rehabilitated and is in very poor condition. All bridges are in very poor condition, except the Wau Bridge.
- 123 km Nyabiondo–Walikale axis: the road has not been rehabilitated and is in very poor condition. All bridges are in poor condition.
- 45 km Mweso–Pinga/Bushimoo axis: the road has not been rehabilitated, and all four bridges (including Kashuga and Kaleme) are in very poor condition.
- 56 km Sake–Kitshanga axis: the road has not been rehabilitated and remains in poor condition, with all bridges in very poor condition.
- 20 km Kitshanga–Mweso axis: the road is in poor condition.

==== Agricultural access roads ====
A network of agricultural access roads connects rural production areas to markets and population centers. These include:

- Goma–Sake: 23 km
- Sake–Minova: 30 km
- Sake–Ngungu: approximately 30 km
- Sake–Rubaya: approximately 30 km
- Sake–Kitshanga: 56 km
- Mweso–Pinga: approximately 45 km
- Sake–Masisi–Kashebere: approximately 108 km
- Lushebere–Muheto–Nyamitaba–Ngandjo: approximately 42 km
- Sake–Lushebere
- Roads serving Katoyi, Nyamaboko II, Ufamando I and II, and Bashali/Kaembe: approximately 900 km

=== Communication and energy ===
The primary telecommunications operators are Orange RDC, Tigo, and Vodacom. Mobile network coverage is generally poor, and there are no official outlets for purchasing phone credit. Instead, airtime and SIM cards are commonly sold by private vendors. Vodacom's M-Pesa mobile money service is available.

The principal energy sources include petroleum products (fuel), wood, and solar power. Because electricity is largely unavailable, many households depend on flashlights and kerosene lamps for nighttime lighting. Solar panels are primarily used to charge mobile phone batteries, though some families also use them for lighting. A limited number of households operate generators connected to small local power systems. Wood remains widely used for cooking and for the production of charcoal.
