= Battle of Bambo =

- Part of M23 campaign (2022–present)
Date	October 26, 2023
Location	Bambo, Rutshuru Territory, North Kivu, Democratic Republic of the Congo
Result	M23 victory

Belligerents
Democratic Republic of the Congo; FDLR	M23; Rwanda (per UN)

Casualties and losses
Unknown	Unknown
- 1+ civilian killed Dozens of thousands of civilians displaced

On October 26, 2023, Rwandan-backed M23 rebels attacked the town of Bambo, North Kivu, Democratic Republic of the Congo, capturing the town for the second time in less than two years.

== Background ==
Bambo is located in Rutshuru Territory of North Kivu province, in the DRC. In November 2022, at the onset of the M23 invasion backed by Rwanda, the town was captured by M23 fighters alongside the nearby towns of Kishishe and Bugina. In February 2023, Amnesty International reported on M23 fighters raping civilians in Bambo, around the same time as the killing of 171 civilians in M23-occupied Kishishe came to light. In April 2023, M23 withdrew from areas Bambo and surrounding villages like Kishishe, but remained within 20 kilometres (12 mi) of the city.

Bambo and the surrounding area has a population of about 33,000 people. Fighting broke out near the city on October 6 between M23 and pro-government Wazalendo groups.

== Battle ==
Prior to the battle, drone footage captured by the United Nations in mid-October showed columns of soldiers and military vehicles, believed to be from Rwanda, moving towards Bambo. The offensive on the city was launched on October 26, with residents reporting that M23 bombs were raining on the city as people fled. M23 forces began entering the town from the south. Congolese soldiers fleeing Bambo with the civilians harassed people for their phones and personal belongings. Some bombs fell in the center of the town. A security source interviewed by Le Monde said that Congolese soldiers were still fighting for control of the town on October 26 "but there are a lot of rebels in the city." AFP reporters embedded in Bambo as it fell said that FDLR militants - who have a stronghold in the area - were fighting for control of the city alongside poorly-equipped Congolese soldiers, despite the Congolese government's insistence that it does not cooperate with the FDLR.

At least one civilian died in the battle, identified by AFP as a 23-year-old man named Hakiza. Dozens of thousands of civilians were displaced, many sheltering in the Bambo hospital. One civilian interviewed by Burundian media said that they were afraid to stay in Bambo so as to not suffer a repeat of the massacre in Kishishe.

The offensive on Bambo was one of several undertaken by the M23 on October 26. Fighting also broke out in Kibumba further south. M23 captured Bambo within a day, and the territorial administration of the city called on Congolese forces to recapture it.
