= Bukumu Chiefdom =

Chiefdom in Nyiragongo Territory, North Kivu

- Chiefdom
- Chefferie de Bukumu
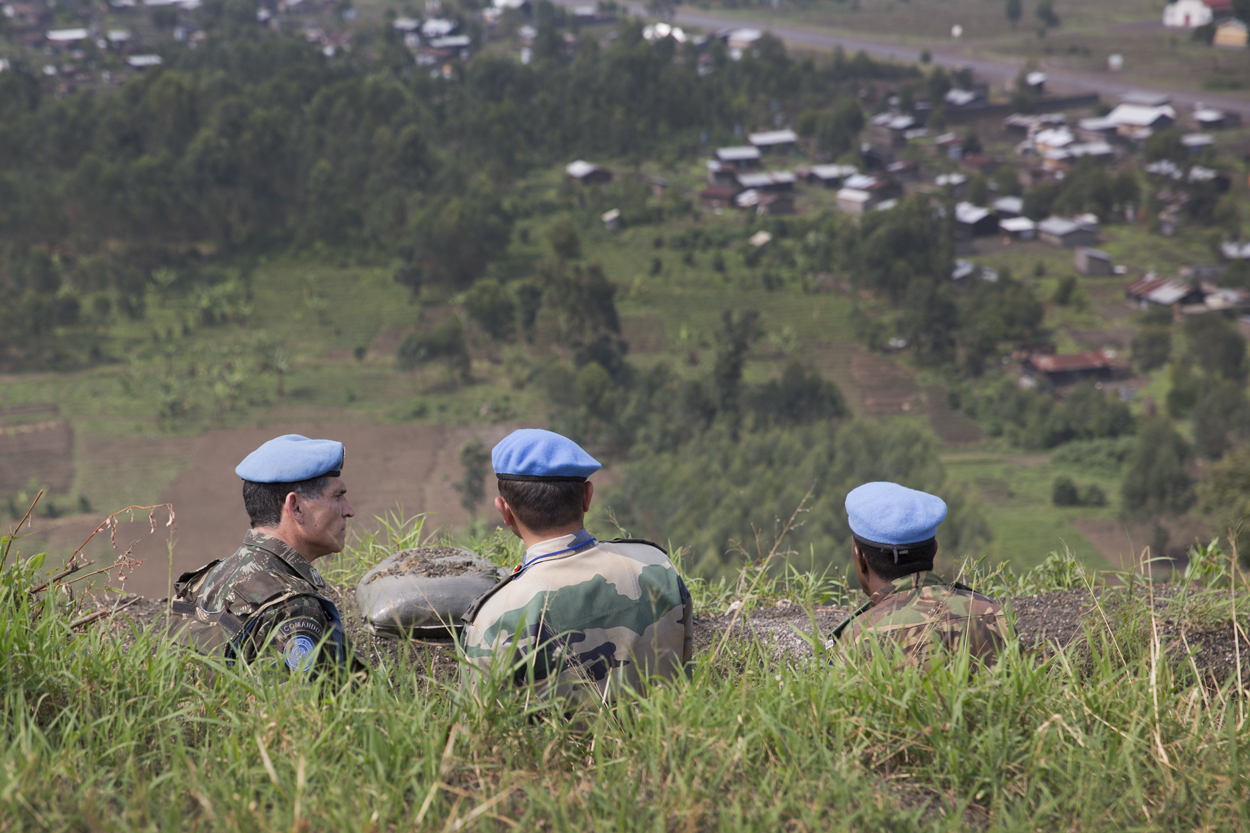
- MONUSCO in Munigi, Bukumu Chiefdom
- Country: Democratic Republic of the Congo
- Province: North Kivu
- Territory: Nyiragongo
- Chief town: Munigi

Government
  - Mwami: Lebon Bazima Bakungu (Since 2020)

Area
  - Total: 333 km^{2} (129 sq mi)

Population (2022)
  - Total: 338,966
- Official language: French
- National language: Kiswahili

The Bukumu Chiefdom (French: Chefferie de Bukumu) is a chiefdom located in the Nyiragongo Territory of the North Kivu province in the eastern region of the Democratic Republic of the Congo. It is bounded to the north by Bwisha Chiefdom in Rutshuru Territory, to the south by Goma, to the east by Rwanda, and to the west by Masisi Territory. As the sole chiefdom in Nyiragongo Territory, Bukumu Chiefdom spans 333 km^{2}, with more than half of its land (170 km^{2}) incorporated into Virunga National Park, while the remaining 163 km^{2} is inhabited by a population estimated at 338,966 as of the 2022 census.

Bukumu Chiefdom's political and economic landscape is shaped by its proximity to the Rwandan border, rapid urbanization, and complex identity and governance dynamics. The chiefdom is administratively structured into seven groupements, further subdivided into 58 villages. However, since 2006, the former groupements of Kibumba and Buhumba have been reclassified as rural communes by presidential decree, placing them outside the authority of customary rule. The Bakumu people traditionally govern the chiefdom, but its population also includes Shi, Nande, Hunde, Hutu, Tutsi, and other ethnic groups.

== Geography ==
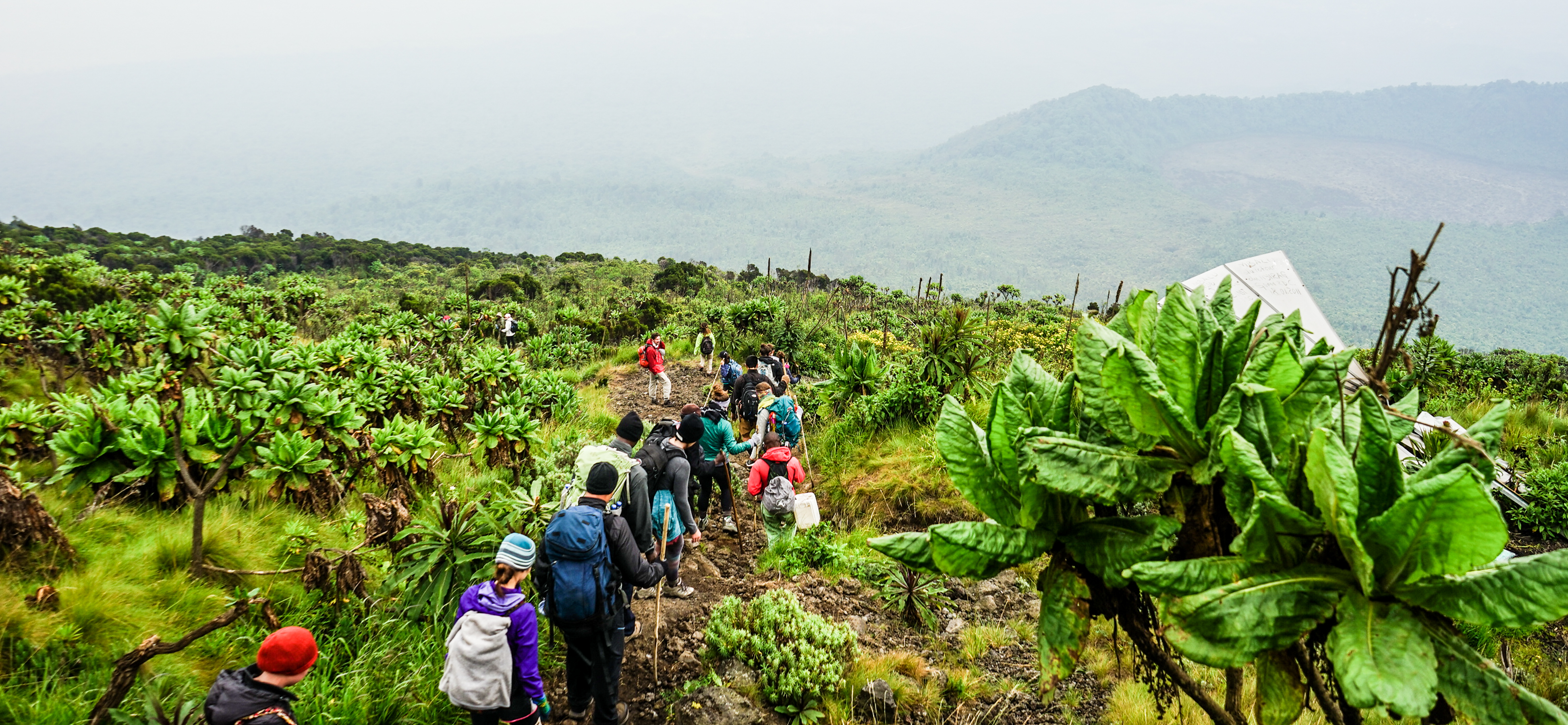
Virunga National Park

Bukumu Chiefdom features a distinctive and dynamic landscape carved by its altitude and volcanic activity. Spanning an area of 333 km^{2}, it ranges in elevation from 1,500 to 2,700 meters above sea level, featuring an expansive plain that gradually descends toward Lake Kivu in the western periphery. Within this area, 170 km^{2} are occupied by the Virunga National Park, while 163 km^{2} are allocated for anthropogenic activities, including the construction of shelters for internally displaced persons due to the volcanic eruption of 2022. Despite being nearby water bodies, Bukumu is devoid of rivers or significant watercourses due to the area's active volcanic mountains.

=== Volcanic influence ===
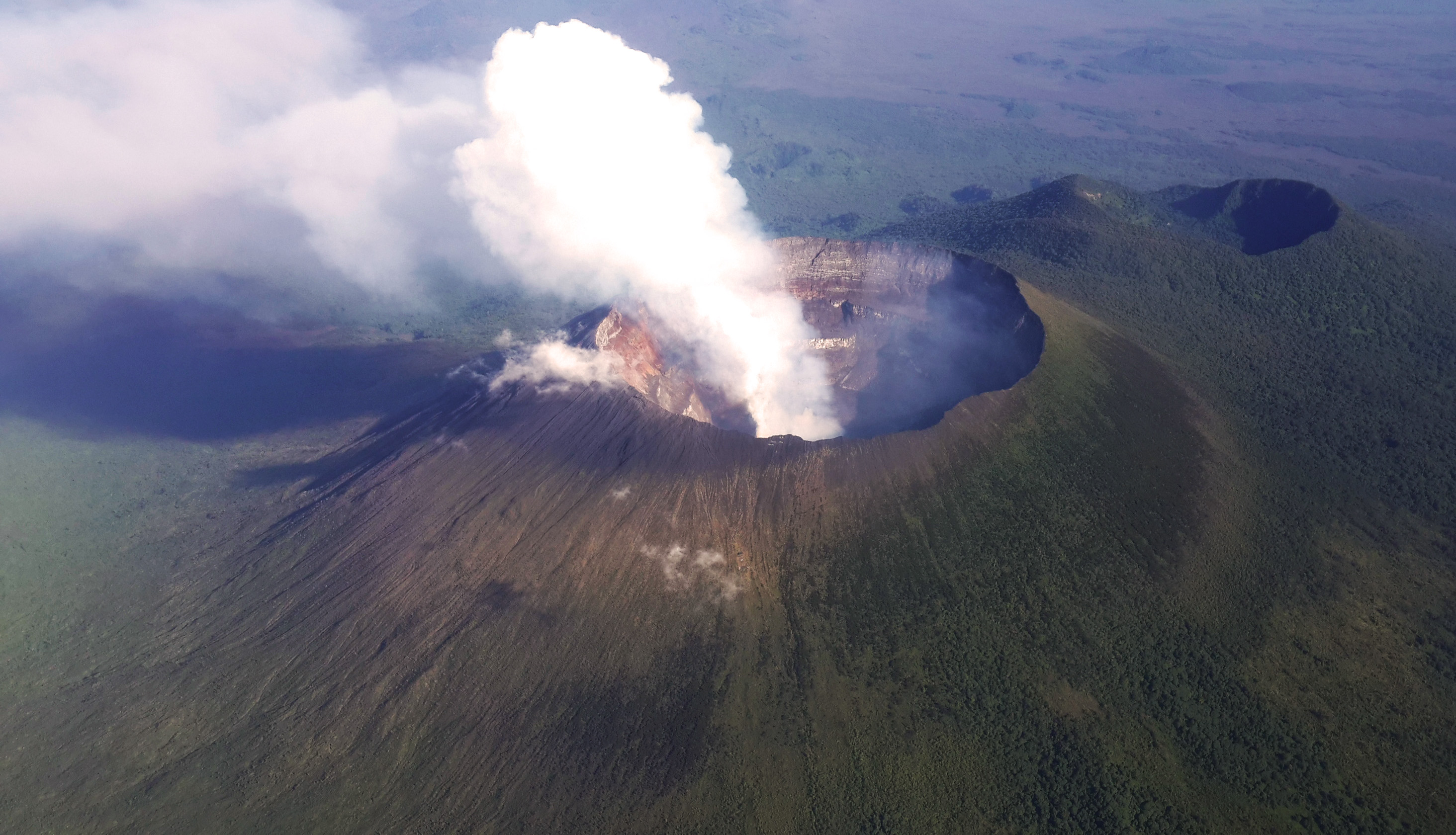
An aerial view of the towering volcanic peak of Mount Nyiragongo

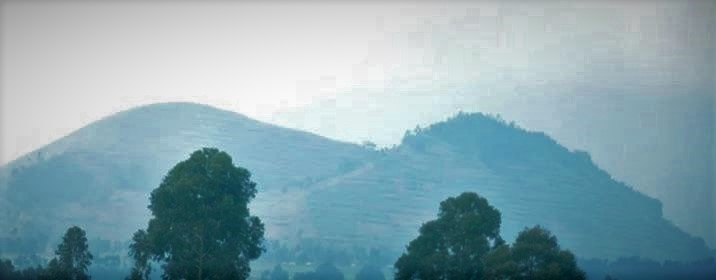
Hehu hills, located in the Buhumba groupement

The Chiefdom's topography is mainly shaped by the Nyiragongo and Nyamulagira volcanoes, whose numerous eruptions have formed vast lava plains. These eruptions have deposited layers of volcanic rock, radically altering the terrain and obliterating much of the existing natural landscape. More than 80% of Bukumu's land surface is covered by volcanic soil, which provides challenges and opportunities for agriculture and habitation.

=== Vegetation ===
Prior to the onset of overpopulation, the predominant vegetation within the Bukumu Chiefdom was characterized by grassy savannah. However, due to the volcanic nature of the soil and the ongoing environmental ramifications, identifying the specific composition of the current vegetation has become challenging. The chiefdom no longer retains its original phytogeographical cover, and the extant vegetation remains largely unclassified.

=== Climate ===
Bukumu Chiefdom experiences a temperate climate. The region is generally partitioned into two principal seasons: the dry season and the rainy season. However, these seasons exhibit variability between the northern and southern parts of the chiefdom. In the northern region, precipitation is nearly incessant throughout the year, with the sole arid period occurring briefly in June and July. This extended rainy season supports agriculture but can also lead to challenges such as flooding. Conversely, the southern region, positioned at an altitude analogous to that of Goma (1,493 meters), encounters a more heterogeneous climate characterized by four distinct seasons. A major rainy season takes place in November, followed by a long dry season in May and June. There is also a shorter dry season in January and February, and a brief rainy period in March and April.

=== Administrative division ===
The Bukumu Chiefdom functions as a semi-autonomous rural division of Nyiragongo Territory. The customary leader, known as the "mwami", plays a vital part in law enforcement and wields both traditional and territorial power. The appointment of the mwami is determined by ethnic customs and is recognized or formalized by the state following the application of traditional protocols. The chiefdom is partitioned into groupements (groupings), which extend traditional authority at the level of consolidated villages (localités), each supervised by village chiefs. The heads of groupements provide essential support to the chiefdom's leadership, while the village leaders assist the groupement leaders within their respective domains.

As of 2018, the Bukumu Chiefdom is administratively subdivided into seven groupings (groupements), encompassing a total of 58 villages (localités).

==== Groupements ====
- Buvira
- Kibumba
- Kibati
- Mudja
- Munigi
- Rusayo
- Buhumba

Among these administrative divisions, Buhumba is the largest groupement, covering an area of 36 square kilometers, while Buvira is the smallest, spanning 17 square kilometers. The chiefdom's administrative office is located in Munigi, positioned 5 kilometers north of Goma and 15 kilometers south of the Nyiragongo volcano.

== History ==
=== Early history ===
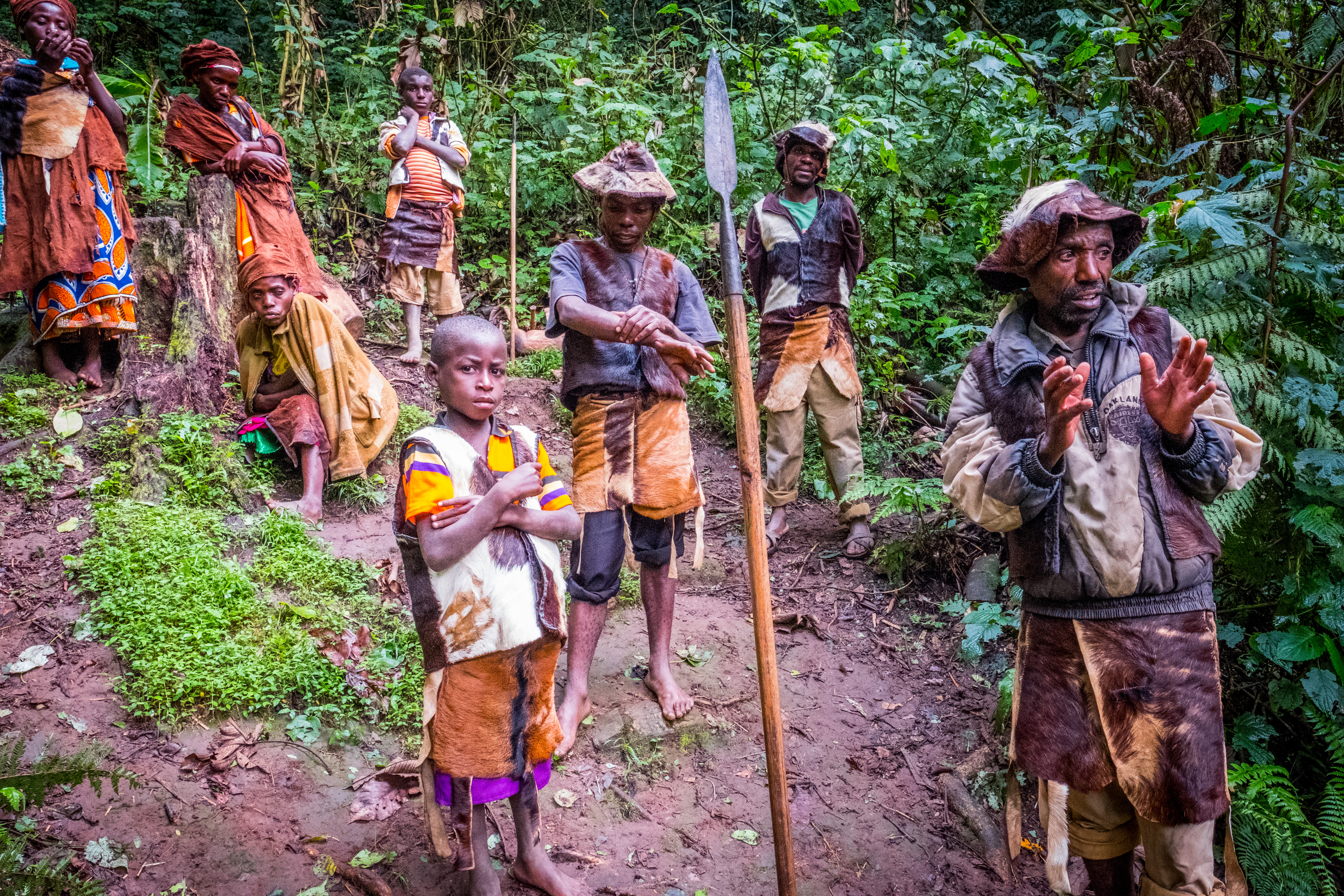
A group of Batwa residing in Nkuringo, Uganda.

Bakumu people are believed to be the region's earliest inhabitants. According to a 1920 investigative report on indigenous chiefdoms in the Kivu District (recorded as Official Report No. 58), the Bakumu migrated from Bunyoro in Uganda into Bwito Chiefdom, located in Rutshuru Territory, under the leadership of Nyangavu. Part of this group established themselves in what is now the "Birunga [Virunga] chieftaincy". A subsequent inquiry recorded that Nyangavu settled in Kibumba, while a man named Bihemu—the forebear of Mukumu—continued onward to Kibati and Munigi, where he established his headquarters. His journey extended as far as the Sebea River, now within the territory of Gisenyi in Rwanda, where he encountered a Rwandan Hutu chief named Kadjugiri on the eastern bank.

While the Bakumu are typically recognized as the primary inhabitants of the chiefdom, alternative narratives propose that the Batwa, an indigenous and historically marginalized group, predated them in the Bukumu region. Batwa communities were dispersed across several locations, including Hehu near the Rwandan frontier, Kibare to the north of the Karisimbi volcano, southeast of Mudja, and south of Kibumba.

=== Territorial delimitation and formation of Bukumu Chiefdom ===
The boundary demarcation of 1910 resulted in the territories of Goma, Bihai, and Kibati—formerly part of this sphere—being ceded to the Belgian Congo. This redrawing of borders prompted the withdrawal of envoys representing Yuhi V Musinga, King of Rwanda, to whom these lands, once under the authority of the former Kilogosi chiefs, had been subject. After a period of deliberation, the area was placed under the joint authority of Kayembe and Bigilimana, both formally installed in 1913. The advent of World War I had profound ramifications on the region, with Belgian forces losing control of Goma to German troops in 1915, backed by local Rwandan chiefs. The German occupation devastated the local population and the territory. Bigilimana was later removed from his position on suspicion of having served the Germans during the war. Bukumu Chiefdom was officially founded in 1920 by Kahembe, a key figure who played a crucial role in stabilizing the region. With the approval of the Belgian colonial administration, Kahembe was appointed mwami and named the chiefdom "Bukumu" after his ethnic group. Under his leadership, the region gradually recuperated from the scourges of famine and warfare. Kahembe's authority helped restore prosperity to the region, bringing people back to the fertile lands that had suffered from years of conflict and natural disasters.

Two separate wives gave birth to Kahembe's sons, Démplé Bigaruka Kahembe and Bénoit Butsitsi Kahembe — the latter being the son of a Tutsi wife. Upon Kahembe's retirement, Bigaruka was appointed interim chief while Butsitsi served in the military. In 1962, Butsitsi died in a car accident, leaving behind two minors, Godefroid Butsitsi Kahembe and Jean-Bosco Butsitsi Bigirwa. A commission of inquiry later restored the chiefdom to Démplé Bigaruka Kahembe, who ruled until 1975. He designated his son, Bakungu Bigaruka, as his successor. Bakungu governed from 1975 until his assassination on 8 October 1995 in Munigi. His death marked the beginning of heightened succession conflicts within Bukumu Chiefdom, as Bakungu left no heirs.

The conflict escalated during the First Congo War when the Rwandophone-dominated AFDL rebellion supported the Butsitsi clan's claim to chieftaincy. Godefroid Butsitsi Kahembe, one of Butsitsi's sons, was appointed as the mwami by the AFDL. However, the region remained embroiled in violence, and in December 1997, Godefroid was assassinated alongside Mwami Ndeze Ndabishoboye of Bwisha Chiefdom in Rutshuru Territory. While the AFDL attributed the killings to Rwandan Interahamwe militias, some factions within Bukumu suspected the rival Bigaruka clan of orchestrating the killings. Following Godefroid's assassination, his brother Jean-Bosco Butsitsi Bigirwa was installed as chief by the AFDL. Jean-Bosco also received the backing of the Tutsi-led rebel group, Rally for Congolese Democracy–Goma (RCD), during the Second Congo War. Despite this endorsement, the succession crisis continued to fracture the Bukumu Chiefdom. In mid-November 2001, Jean-Bosco narrowly survived an assassination attempt, though it remains unclear whether the attack was connected to the ongoing succession conflict.

In December 2006, a new military integration initiative known as "mixage" was introduced, aiming to incorporate the forces of the Congolese Tutsi-led National Congress for the Defense of the People (CNDP), commanded by Laurent Nkunda, into the national army. This strategy led to the formation of six mixed brigades intended to combat the Democratic Forces for the Liberation of Rwanda (FDLR). The mixage process began in early 2007 but soon unraveled, with conflicting accounts of the agreements between the parties. Nkunda maintained control over his forces, keeping them operational and securing financial and military support. The counterinsurgency efforts against the FDLR contributed to severe human rights violations, particularly against the Hutu population, which had long coexisted with the FDLR in the region.

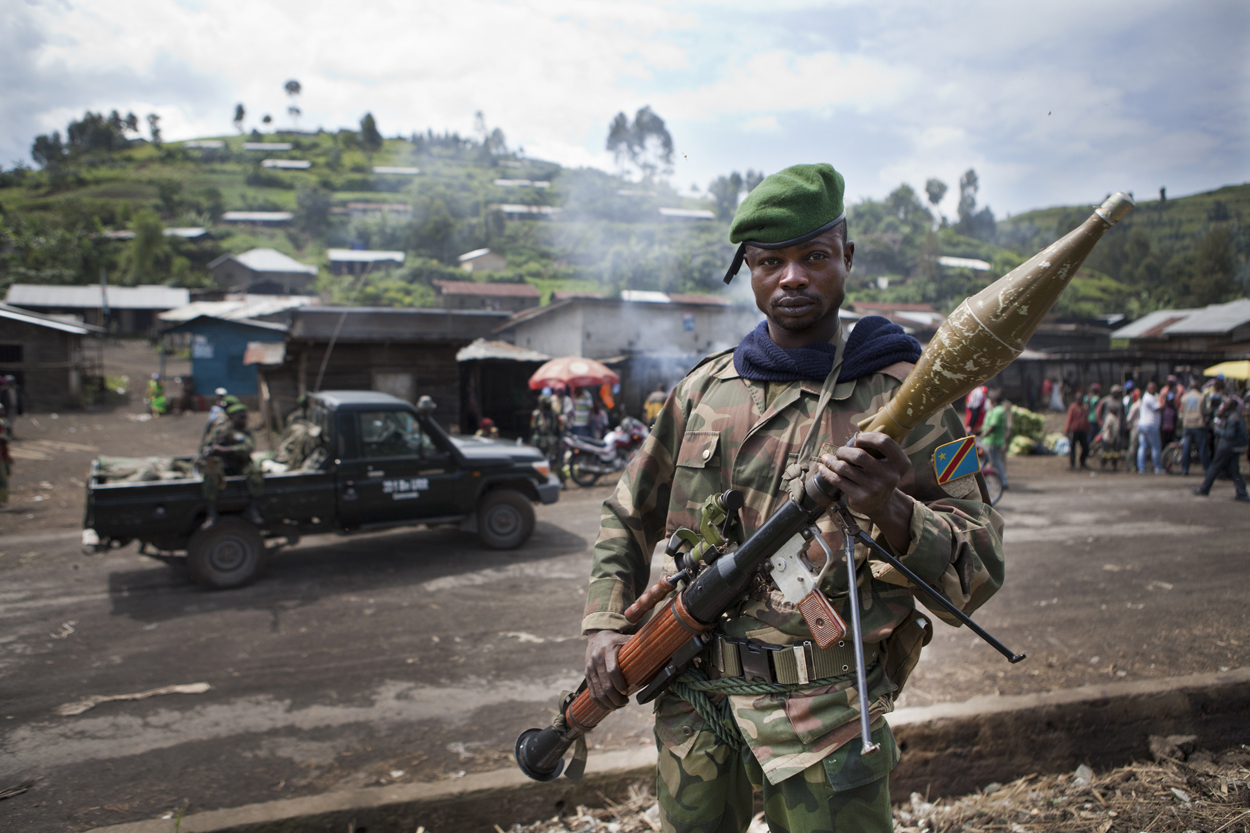
A FARDC soldier deployed in Kibumba groupement, the last position before entering M23-controlled territory in September 2012

By mid-2007, as the mixage process disintegrated, clashes erupted between CNDP forces and FARDC. CNDP fighters fortified strategic locations, particularly in Runyoni, Bunagana, the Tongo groupement of Bwito Chiefdom, and Nyanzale, which were vital transit corridors to Rwanda and Uganda. By December 2007, the Congolese government launched a large-scale offensive against the CNDP, deploying around 20,000 troops. However, this campaign ended in failure, culminating in a CNDP victory at Mushaki on 10 December. The following day, FARDC, with support from United Nations Mission in the Democratic Republic of Congo (MONUC), resumed operations in multiple locations, including Kibati and Mweso. The conflict escalated in October 2008, with intense clashes between FARDC and CNDP forces across the region, particularly in the Kibumba-Rumangabo-Kalengera corridor. CNDP troops seized control of the Rumangabo military camp and key locations between Kalengera and Kibumba, situated 30 kilometers north of Goma. MONUC reinforced its positions in Kibumba and Rubare to prevent further CNDP advances toward Rutshuru and Goma. The fighting led to massive displacement, with Kibumba's population fleeing to Kibati and Munigi, approximately ten kilometers north of Goma. Reports indicate that around 20,000 displaced persons sought refuge in Kibati. In November 2008, CNDP forces forcibly emptied, looted, and burned multiple displacement camps near Rutshuru.

Beyond the armed conflict, natural disasters have also impacted the region. On 15–16 May 2010, heavy rainfall in the Kibumba groupement resulted in significant destruction, with five reported deaths, around fifty individuals missing, and several homes destroyed in Gafizi village. In September 2010, a leadership dispute emerged between Jean-Bosco Butsitsi Bigirwa and Jean Claude Rwandinda Bigaruka, both of whom claimed to be the rightful customary chief of the chiefdom.

Jean-Bosco abdicated the throne on 29 March 2016 following a suspension he deemed politically and tribally motivated. On 12 October 2020, Lebon Bazima Bakungu was acknowledged as the legitimate chief and rightful heir to the Bukumu throne among the three claimants: Jean Bosco, Isaac Butsitsi, and Lebon Bakungu, following a decree from the Provincial Consultative Commission for the Settlement of Customary Conflicts (Commission Consultative Provinciale de Règlements des Conflits Coutumiers; CCPRCC). This verdict came after a comprehensive survey conducted over four weeks among the twelve ruling families of the Bukumu Chiefdom at the behest of the governor of North Kivu and the national Ministry of the Interior and Security, under the ministerial order No. 025/CAB/VPM/MININTERSEC/ERS/037/2018 of 19 February 2018, which recognizes a chief of chiefdom.

== Urbanization ==
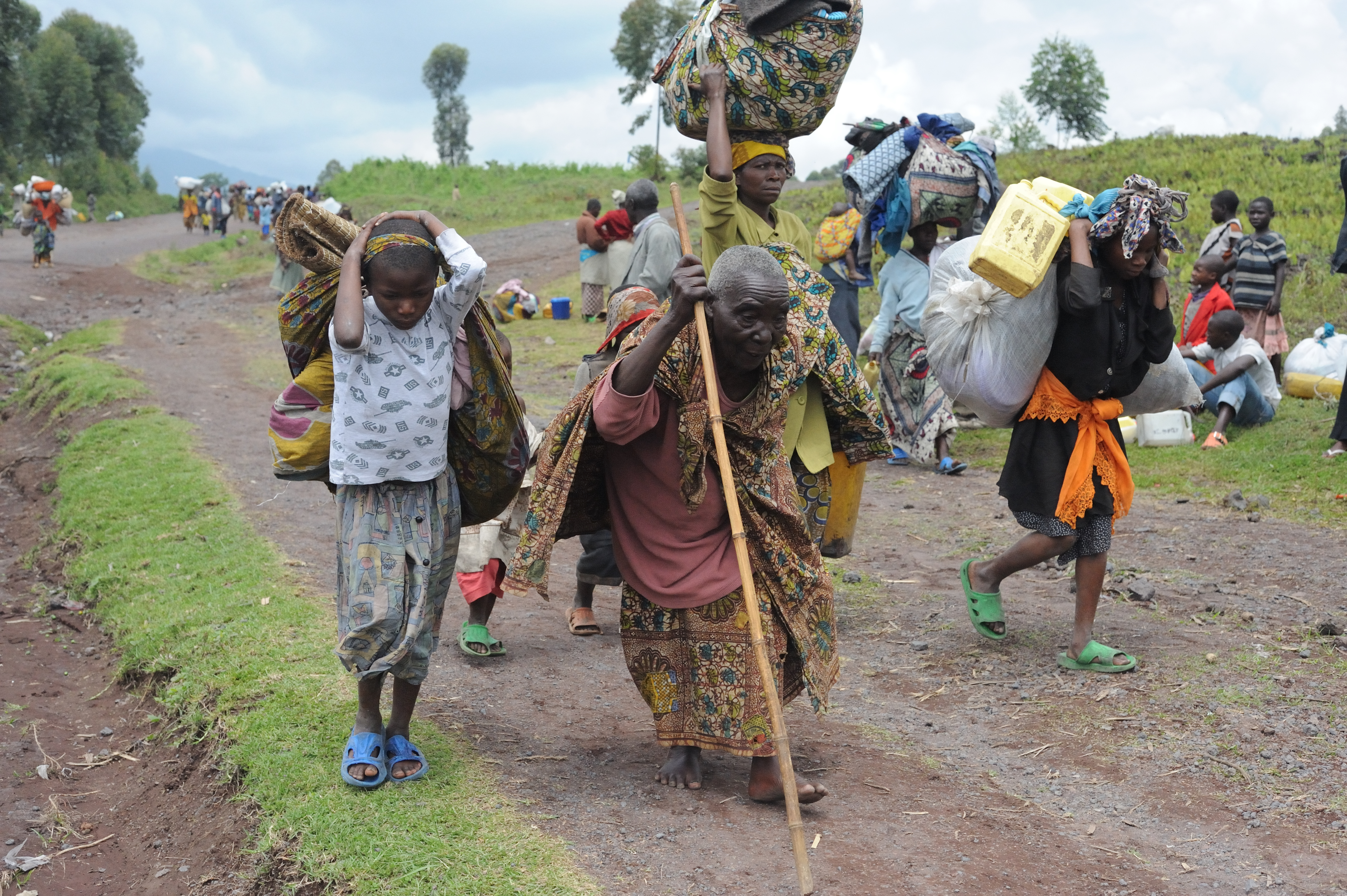
Kibati villagers fleeing gunfire in a camp for internally displaced persons during the 2008 Nord-Kivu campaign

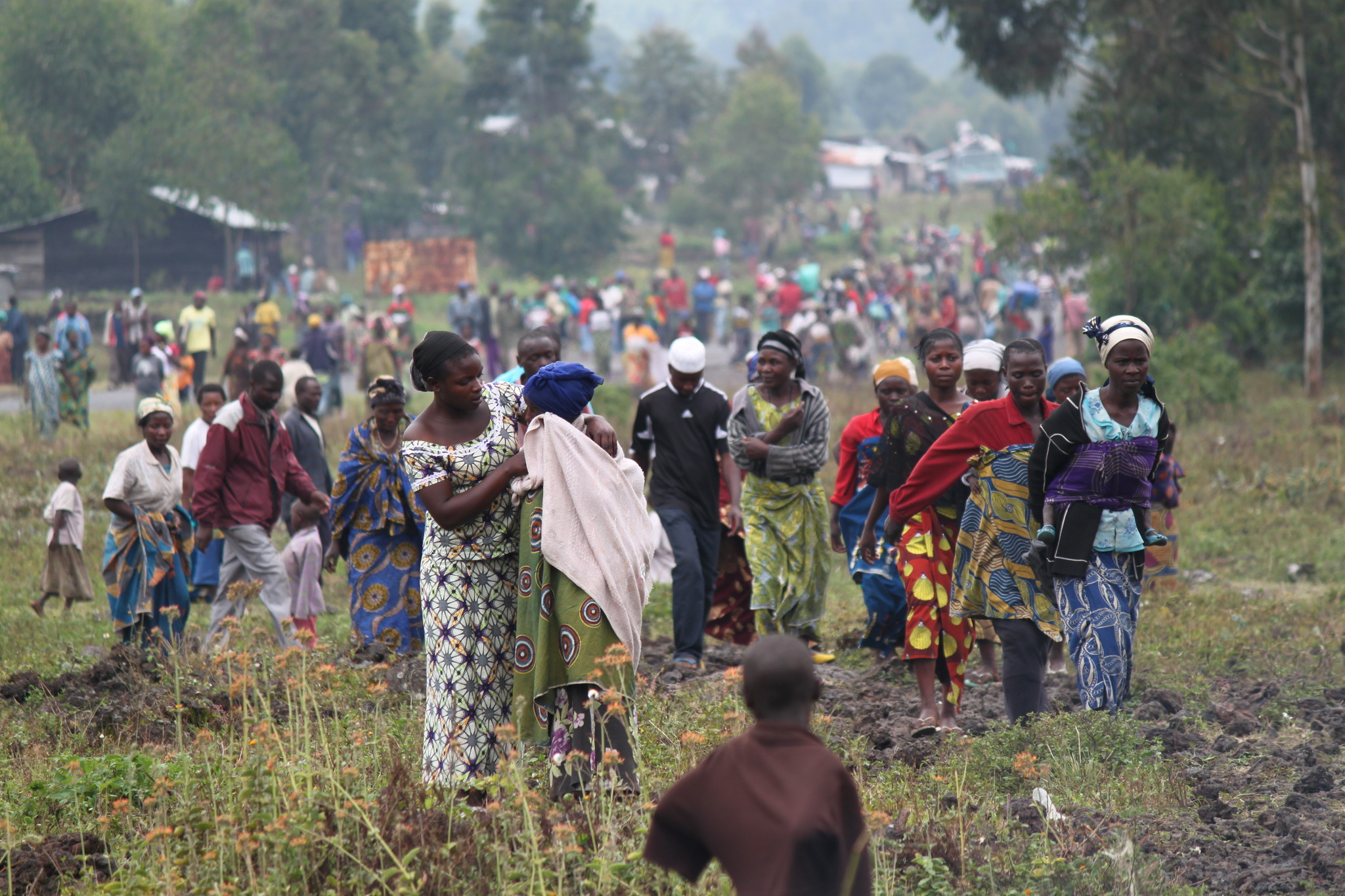
In June 2012, thousands of families arrived at Kibati camp, fleeing for their lives. That same month of that year, the camp housed around 50,000 people

Urbanization has profoundly reshaped the Bukumu Chiefdom, influencing its social, political, economic, and infrastructural development. Traditionally a rural and agricultural region, Bukumu's economy was historically driven by banana plantations and the cultivation of potatoes, cabbages, and other vegetables, with surplus produce traded beyond national borders, particularly in Rwanda. The region was also known for producing kasiksi (banana beer), which was sold in Bahunde Chiefdom, Buhavu Chiefdom, and Bushi. The fertile volcanic soil of the Kibumba groupement made Bukumu a key center for potato farming in Kivu, supplying markets in Bukavu, Goma, Rutshuru, Masisi, and Rwanda. Additionally, logging and livestock farming played crucial roles in the local economy. However, the First and Second Congo Wars significantly disrupted agriculture and livestock rearing, as Rwandan forces looted farms, and successive conflicts, including the M23 rebellions, forced many farmers to abandon their fields. Displaced populations settled on agricultural land, further reducing available farmland, while cattle rustling and plant diseases—such as bacterial wilt affecting banana plantations—accelerated the decline of Bukumu's agricultural sector. Moreover, volcanic eruptions in 1977, 2002, and 2021 destroyed large areas of farmland.

The transition from a rural to an urban landscape has shifted economic activities, with construction materials—such as volcanic stone, sand, gravel, and wood—becoming primary resources due to the rapid urban expansion of Goma, Bunia, and Bukavu. A large sand mine in Munigi is a key supplier for Goma's growing construction industry. The proximity to Goma International Airport has also facilitated the development of industrial activities, attracting national and foreign investors. For instance, Lebanese entrepreneurs have established a mattress production plant in Munigi, employing 114 workers.

The rapid urbanization of southern Bukumu, particularly near Goma, has intensified land competition and led to rising land prices, as agricultural plots are increasingly converted into residential and industrial zones. This shift has transformed Bukumu's political economy, making land access a central issue in local governance and fueling socio-economic tensions.

=== Land conflicts ===
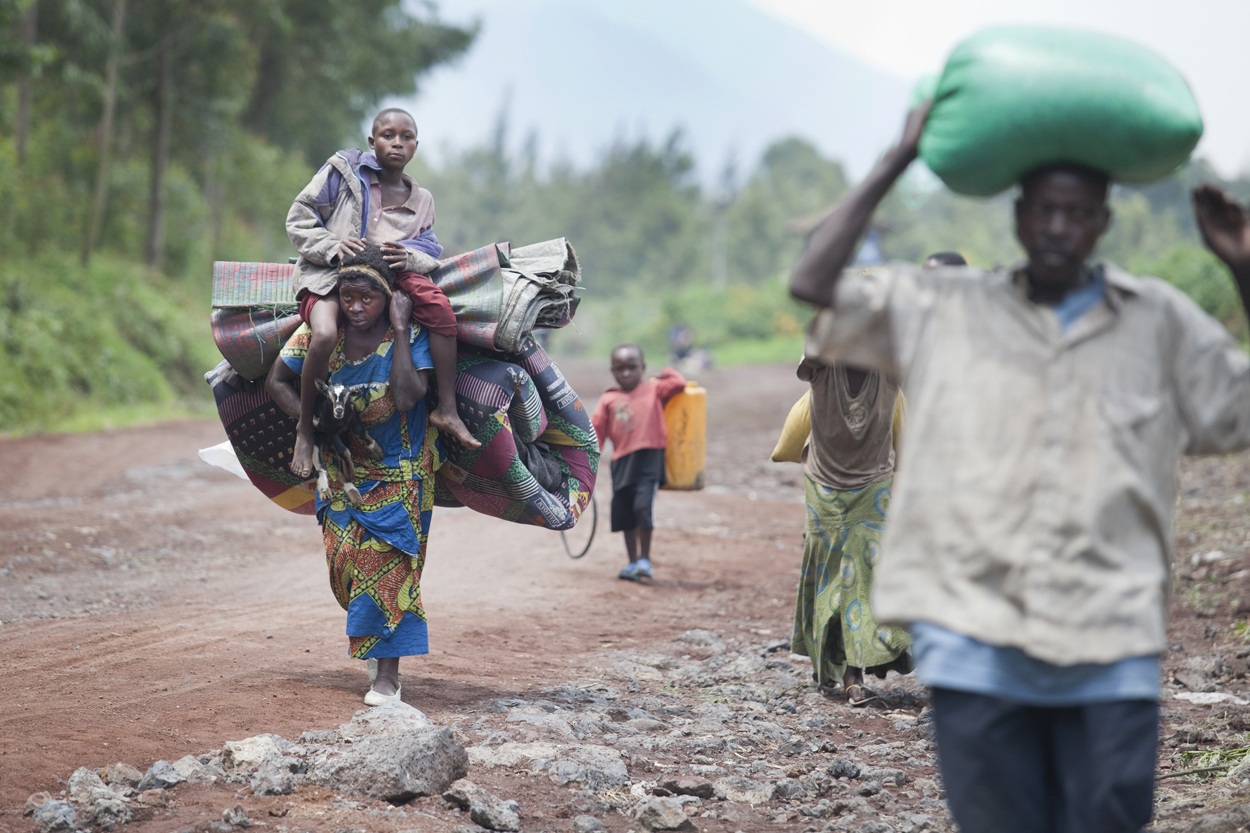
Internally displaced persons (IDPs) arrive in the Munigi groupement as Bosco Ntaganda fighters advance from Goma

The rapid expansion of the city's southern peripheries has attracted migrants from across North Kivu province, driven by the availability of relatively affordable land compared to central Goma. However, this influx has intensified competition for land, leading to a surge in land disputes. One of the primary drivers of these conflicts is the overlapping claims to land ownership and disputes over land titles. Historically, land allocation was managed by customary authorities, but with the expansion of state institutions, multiple entities, including government bodies and modern courts, now issue competing land titles. This lack of centralized authority has resulted in frequent disputes, with approximately 80% of court cases in Goma reportedly involving land issues. Corruption also aggravates the problem as the legacy of state abandonment during the Mobutu Sese Seko's era made many officials susceptible to bribery, influencing land adjudication in favor of those with economic and political power. As land values continue to rise, fraudulent practices such as selling the same plot to multiple buyers or reselling previously allocated plots have become common. In some cases, people who sold land in the past attempt to reclaim it at a higher price.

Since 2018, these land disputes have increasingly been perceived through the lens of ethnic and inter-communal tensions, particularly between the Kumu and Nande communities, the two largest ethnic groups in the region. While the root causes of the conflicts lie in contested land ownership and economic pressures, public discourse often frames them as tribal disputes. For example, in 2021, a protest demanding the withdrawal of MONUSCO escalated into an ethnic confrontation. In response to these disputes, local leaders established the Intercommunal Barza, a traditional conflict resolution platform with cultural significance that facilitates dialogue among community representatives, aiming to resolve disputes amicably before they escalate into broader conflicts. The Barza has played a critical role in de-escalating tensions, such as the 2021 land dispute in Buhene village, where leaders from various ethnic groups delivered peace messages to prevent further violence.

=== Protests over Virunga National Park ===
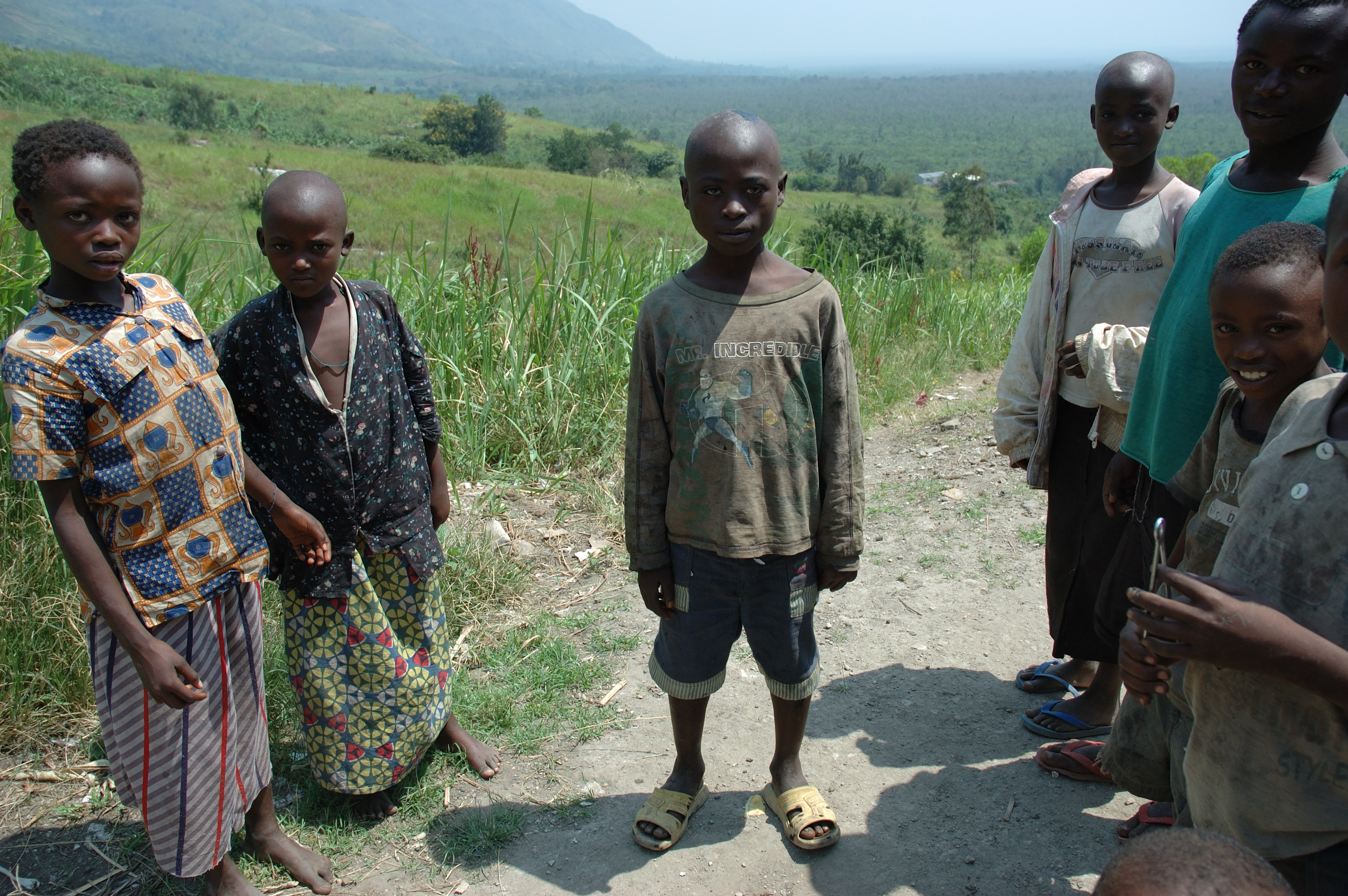
Children playing around the health center, located on a terrace with a view of the plains of Virunga National Park

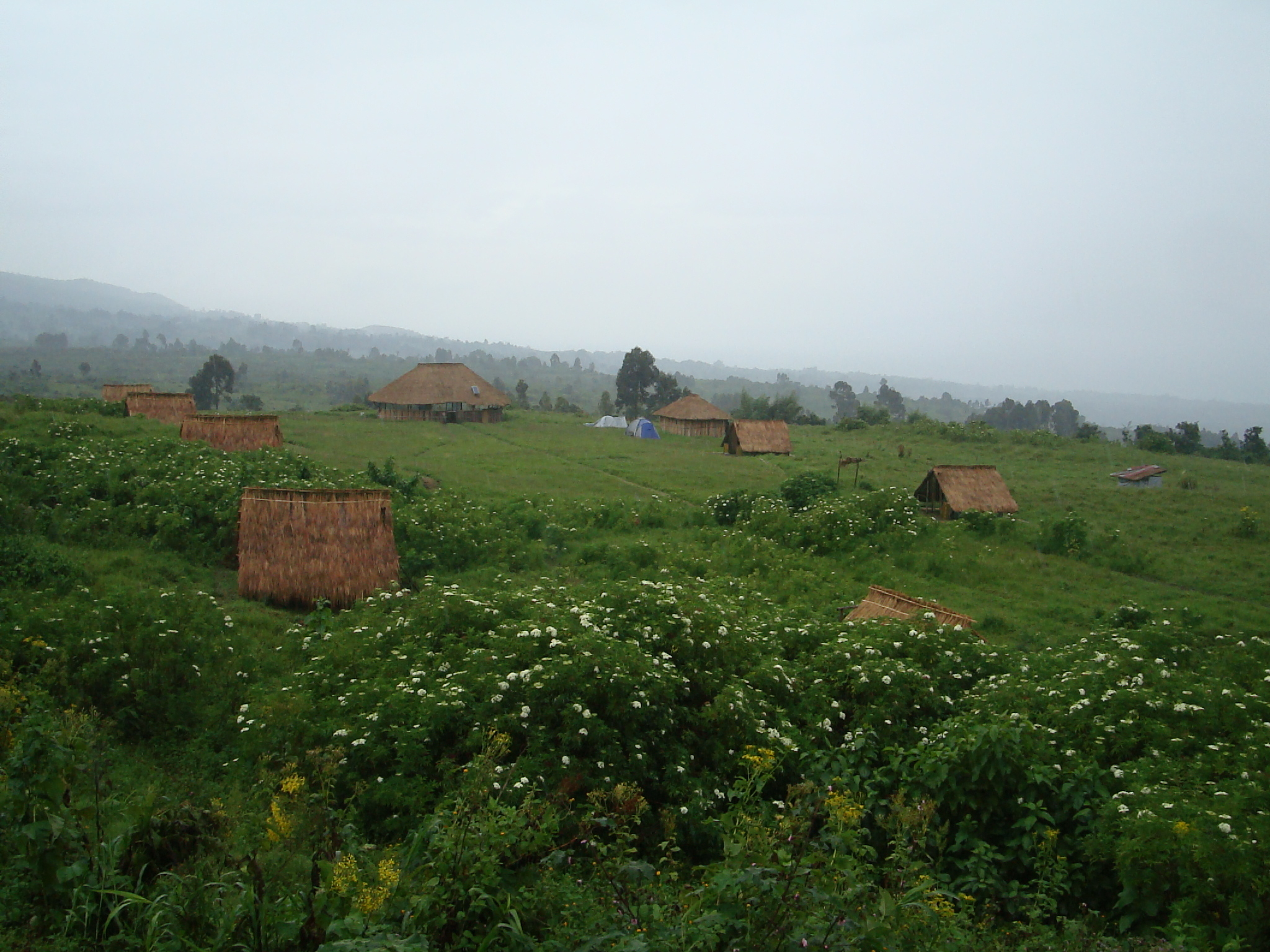
Several thatched huts surrounding the Virunga National Park, offering a scenic view of its vast plains

The dispute over Virunga National Park's boundaries has become a major issue in Bukumu Chiefdom, especially because of its historical and ongoing effects on local communities. Virunga National Park was established in 1925 under Belgian rule as a World Heritage Site, covering 170 square kilometers of the chiefdom's 333 square kilometers. This led to the expropriation of local land, with residents being forced to relinquish their properties to make way for the park. Those who fought against giving up their land were often subjected to violence, and some were even killed for trying to reclaim or access the expropriated areas. Belgian authorities and the Congolese Institute for Nature Conservation (Institut Congolais pour la Conservation de la Nature; ICCN) promised to implement development projects, including schools, roads, and essential services like water and electricity, as compensation for the land taken. However, these promises were never fulfilled. Without written contracts to guarantee the terms of this agreement, the local communities were left without compensation or any tangible benefits from the park, and this historical grievance continues to fuel present-day conflicts as many residents believe that their ancestors were deceived and swindled by the ICCN, which promised benefits in exchange for land but failed to deliver.

The tension between the park authorities and the surrounding communities remains unresolved, as many locals continue to defy park regulations by entering the land they once lived on to cultivate crops. These incursions are seen as a response to the park's expropriation of the land and its failure to meet its development promises. The damage caused by Rwandan refugees cutting down trees on the Rusayu side of the park has only made matters worse. Over the years, the conflict between local communities and park rangers, responsible for protecting the park's boundaries, has intensified as the increasing militarization of conservation efforts in Virunga National Park has led to violent encounters, with park rangers using force to prevent encroachments into the area. These violent confrontations have serious consequences for the local population, whose survival heavily depends on access to the park's resources.

=== The expansion Goma ===
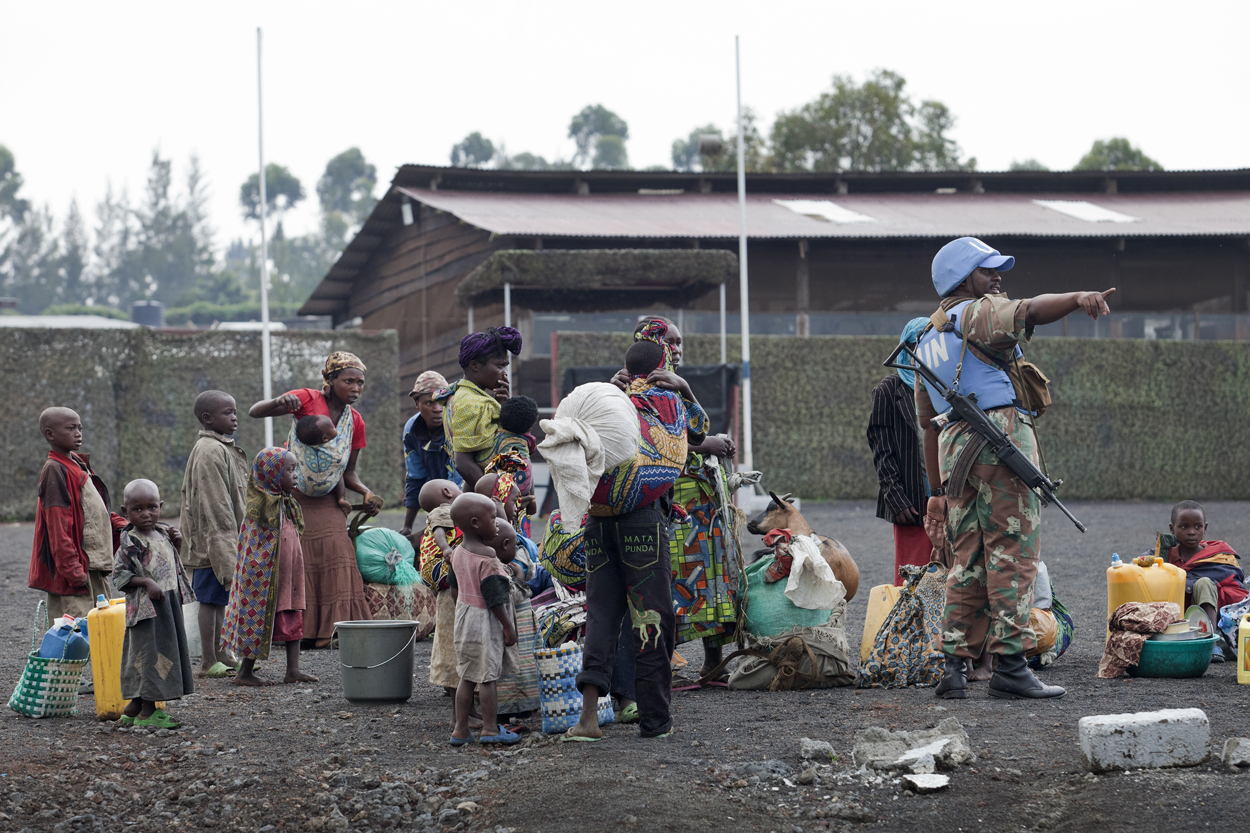
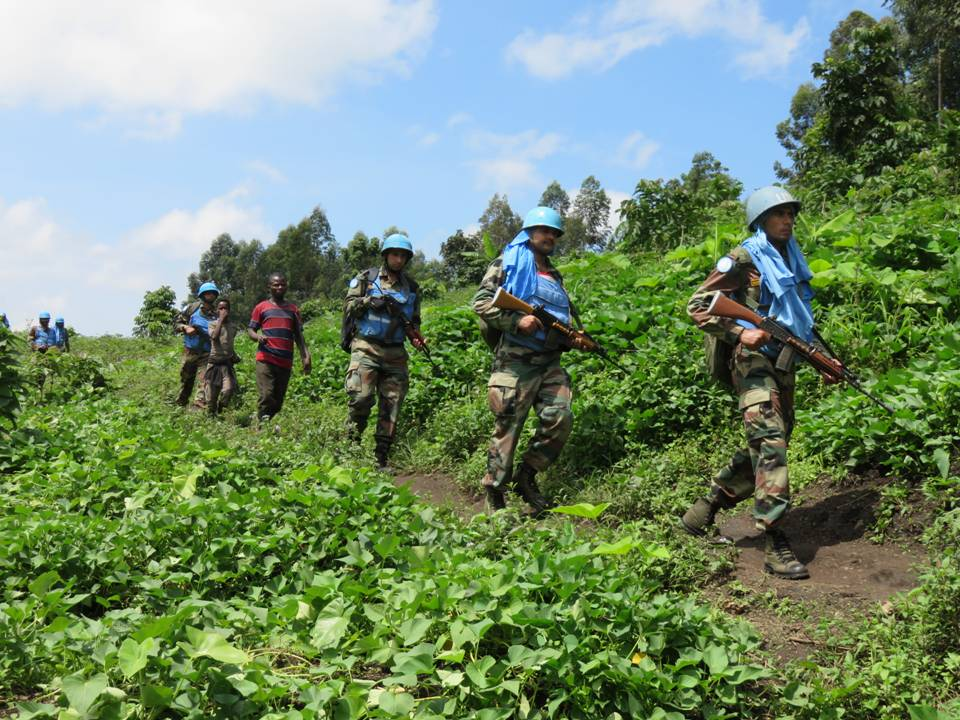
Munigi groupement

The expansion of Goma into Bukumu Chiefdom has become a central issue in land conflicts, as the city's rapid urbanization has encroached on the traditional lands of the chiefdom. Over the years, the administrative boundaries of Goma have increasingly absorbed portions of the Bukumu Chiefdom, leading to disputes over land rights, local governance, and the preservation of community identity. Historically, when Bukumu Chiefdom was created, it comprised eight groupements, including Munigi, Mudja, Rusayo, Buvira, Kibati, Kibumba, Buhumba, and the now-defunct Byahi. In 1988, Goma was officially established, and as part of this process, the Byahi groupement was integrated into the city. This marked the beginning of the chiefdom's loss of its land to urban expansion. The city's growth accelerated during the 1998–2003 Congolese Rally for Democracy (RCD) rebellion, which saw the annexation of parts of Munigi, Mudja, and Rusayo to Goma, as well as the transformation of the Kibumba and Buhumba groupements into rural communes in 2006.

The creation of these rural communes was aimed at improving local administration and public services, but they remained geographically within Bukumu Chiefdom while no longer being managed by it. This dual administrative structure has led to significant confusion and tension, as urban authorities in Goma began to assert control over land management issues traditionally handled by the customary authorities of Bukumu Chiefdom.

==== Urban vs. rural land management and political tensions ====
During the Belgian colonial period, the Land Decree of 1893 established a clear separation between urban land, governed by colonial law, and rural land, governed by customary law under the authority of chiefs. This system persisted after independence and remains in place today. As Goma expanded, the city's authorities increasingly intervened in land disputes within the chiefdom, sometimes issuing land titles for areas within the chiefdom under Goma's jurisdiction. This has led to confusion and disputes over land ownership, particularly in the Nyiragongo Territory, where the Karisimbi commune in Goma issued land titles for properties within its expanded boundaries. Local customary authorities, concerned about losing control over land, have exacerbated these tensions by either unintentionally or deliberately contributing to the confusion.

==== Cultural and political resistance to annexation ====
With the increasing urbanization of the region, Bukumu Chiefdom's area has been reduced to just 163 square kilometers, raising fears among the local population about the erasure of their cultural and historical identity. The prospect of annexation is seen as a direct challenge to the autonomy of the Bakumu people, who fear that their customary land management practices, along with their unique tribal identity, would be lost under Goma's urban governance system.

For many residents of Bukumu, the loss of their land to Goma is not just a matter of economic or political consequence but a profound cultural issue. The annexation of Bukumu land into Goma would mean the dismantling of traditional power structures and the imposition of urban laws over customary practices. Despite this, the idea of annexation remains a contentious topic on the political agenda, with some arguing that it is necessary for the city's growth, while others view it as an existential threat to the identity of the Bakumu people.

=== Challenges to customary power ===
Since its creation, Bukumu Chiefdom has been governed by the Kahembe family, but internal disputes over succession have continuously challenged its stability. The struggle for leadership has primarily been between two branches of the family: the Butsitsi and Bigaruka lineages. Despite customary law dictating that the eldest son should inherit power, succession has not followed a straightforward path, often influenced by external political and ethnic dynamics. The legitimacy of succession has been a point of contention, particularly following the early 1960s when Butsitsi, born to a Tutsi mother, became mwami despite his older brother Bigaruka's seniority. The reasons behind this decision remain debated, with some sources suggesting that Kahembe himself preferred Butsitsi due to Bigaruka's alleged misconduct, while others argue that Bigaruka was the rightful heir. This departure from traditional succession practices set the stage for ongoing disputes that have shaped the governance of the chiefdom.

Following Butsitsi's death in 1962, Bigaruka ruled for over two decades before passing power to his son, Bakungu. However, Bakungu's reign was cut short by a suspicious car accident, after which power shifted back to the Butsitsi lineage amid the influence of armed rebellions. The emergence of Godefroid Butsitsi and later Jean-Bosco Butsitsi was strongly tied to the AFDL and RCD insurgencies. As a member of the Tutsi lineage, Jean-Bosco Butsitsi maintained power through alliances with Rwandan-backed armed groups.

However, his rule ended in 2016 when he lost the favor of the provincial governor, Julien Paluku Kahongya, who backed the Bigaruka family's claim to power. This shift in support was influenced by growing anti-Rwandophone sentiment, leading to the reinstatement of Lebon Bazima Bakungu from the Bigaruka lineage as chief in 2020. Thus, armed conflict, ethnic identity, and external political forces have been pivotal in determining Bukumu's leadership, while the broader instability within the chiefdom is further heightened by its historical structure. Unlike other chiefdoms where power is centralized within a ruling family, Bukumu was formed by consolidating existing customary entities, each of which originally had its own leader. This has meant that the chiefdom's leader often lacks the legitimacy or authority to intervene in internal disputes within these smaller customary units. A key example is the Munigi groupement, where a longstanding succession dispute escalated in 2021. A member of the Kifende family declared himself the rightful leader and, with the support of armed men, assumed control of the groupement's customary authority. However, he was later killed during a government intervention. Subsequently, the provincial government installed Mutumishi Amini Kifende as the official leader. This decision was later overturned by a judicial ruling, reinstating Tuishi Muhire Kakoti Olivier following the intervention of the Ministry of the Interior and Security.

=== Border economy ===
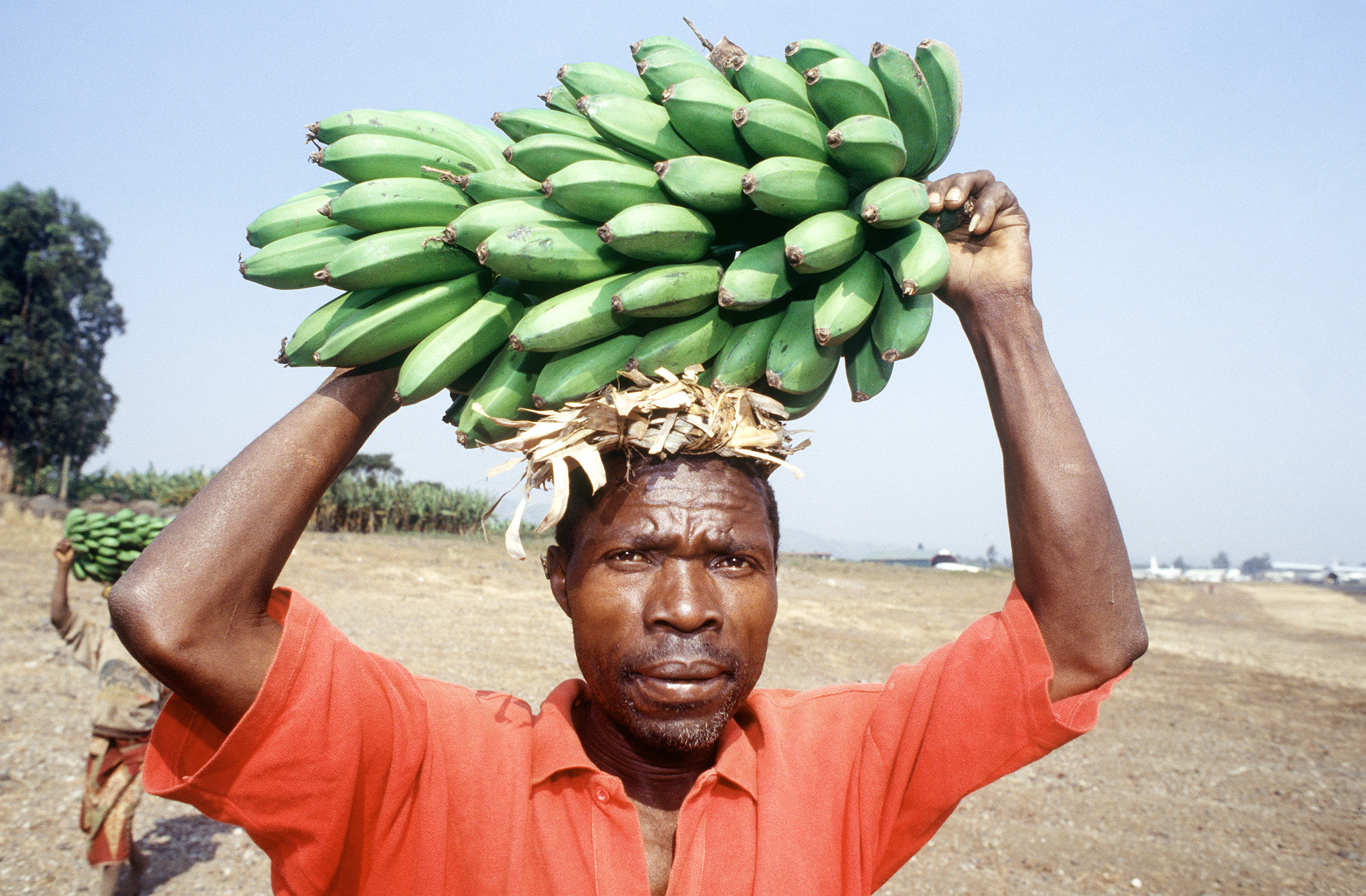
A Rwandan refugee carries a stalk of bananas on his head in the Kibumba refugee camp, one of the many camps sheltering over 1.2 million refugees who fled following the eruption of the Rwandan Civil War, circa August 1994.

The Bukumu Chiefdom's proximity to the Rwandan border has significant implications for its political economy, as the border's delineation between Rwanda and the Democratic Republic of the Congo (formerly Zaire) was historically a colonial construct that initially did not serve as a major social or political divide. Even in the post-independence epoch, inter-communal relations across the border remained largely cooperative, facilitating cross-border trade and movement. However, the cataclysmic Rwandan genocide of 1994 and ensuing conflicts, particularly the tumult that erupted in 1996, introduced new complexities to these interactions. Under the administrations of President Juvénal Habyarimana of Rwanda and President Mobutu Sese Seko of Zaire, the bilateral movement was predominantly unregulated, with people crossing freely for trade and social visits. However, after President Paul Kagame assumed power in Rwanda, political tensions increased, leading to stricter border controls and heightened conflict. Despite these challenges, cross-border trade remains a vital economic mainstay for Bukumu Chiefdom's residents. The region has experienced significant reductions in agricultural land due to volcanic activity and population displacement, making petty mercantilism an essential means of livelihood. Many residents engage in micro-scale trading, selling essential goods such as flour, tomatoes, onions, and spices. This trade is often supported by clandestine socio-economic networks, including kinship ties with the Nande ethnic group in northern North Kivu, which connects Bukumu Chiefdom to key commercial hubs like Butembo and Beni. The chiefdom's strategic location along the primary trade route between Goma and these northern cities also reinforces its significance in regional commerce.

A distinct part of the chiefdom's local economy is the dominance of roadside trading, where many landowners build homes on their plots while reserving space near the road for small businesses. This practice has grown significantly, with traders importing goods from Rwanda, Uganda, and Butembo to meet local demand. The informal economic sector, despite its extralegal dimensions, serves as the linchpin of financial sustenance for many households. Though official customs checkpoints exist, a significant portion of trade occurs through informal and illegal channels. Several unauthorized crossing points facilitate smuggling activities, often conducted at night to evade detection. Security forces, including police, military, and customs officials, are tasked with monitoring these borders, but corruption and limited enforcement capacity allow illicit trade to persist. Smugglers frequently exploit these weaknesses to move goods across the border undetected.

Similarly, Bukumu Chiefdom faces additional security concerns due to the presence of armed groups, with the Kibumba and Buhumba groupements under the control of rebel forces. The continued instability has prompted high-level government attention, including a visit by the Deputy Prime Minister and Minister of the Interior, Security, Decentralization, and Customary Affairs to Customs Terminal No. 13 in the Buvira groupement. This terminal serves as a key point for cross-border trade, with goods frequently bypassing official controls.
