= Nyiragongo Territory =

Nyiragongo Wilaya ya Nyiragongo (Swahili)
- Territory
- Territoire de Nyiragongo
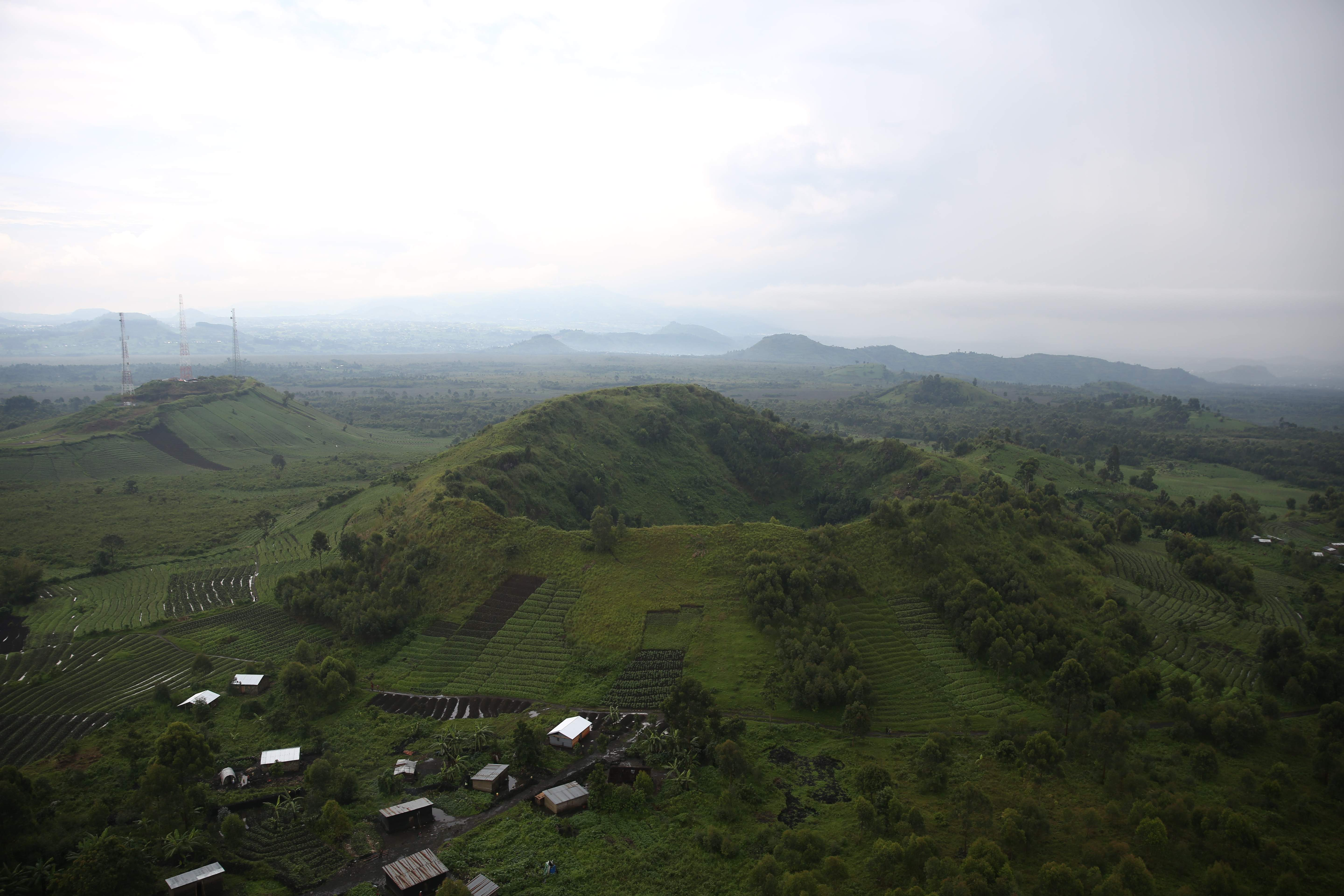
- Kibati, Nyiragongo Territory
- Nyiragongo on a map of North Kivu Province
- Location in DR Congo
- Coordinates: 0.978°S 29.291°E
- Country: DR Congo
- Province: North Kivu

Government
  - Administrator: Jean-Marie Malosa Mboma

Area
  - Total: 333 km^{2} (129 sq mi)

Population (2022 est.)
  - Total: 338,966
- Time zone: UTC+2 (CAT)
- Official language: French
- National language: Swahili

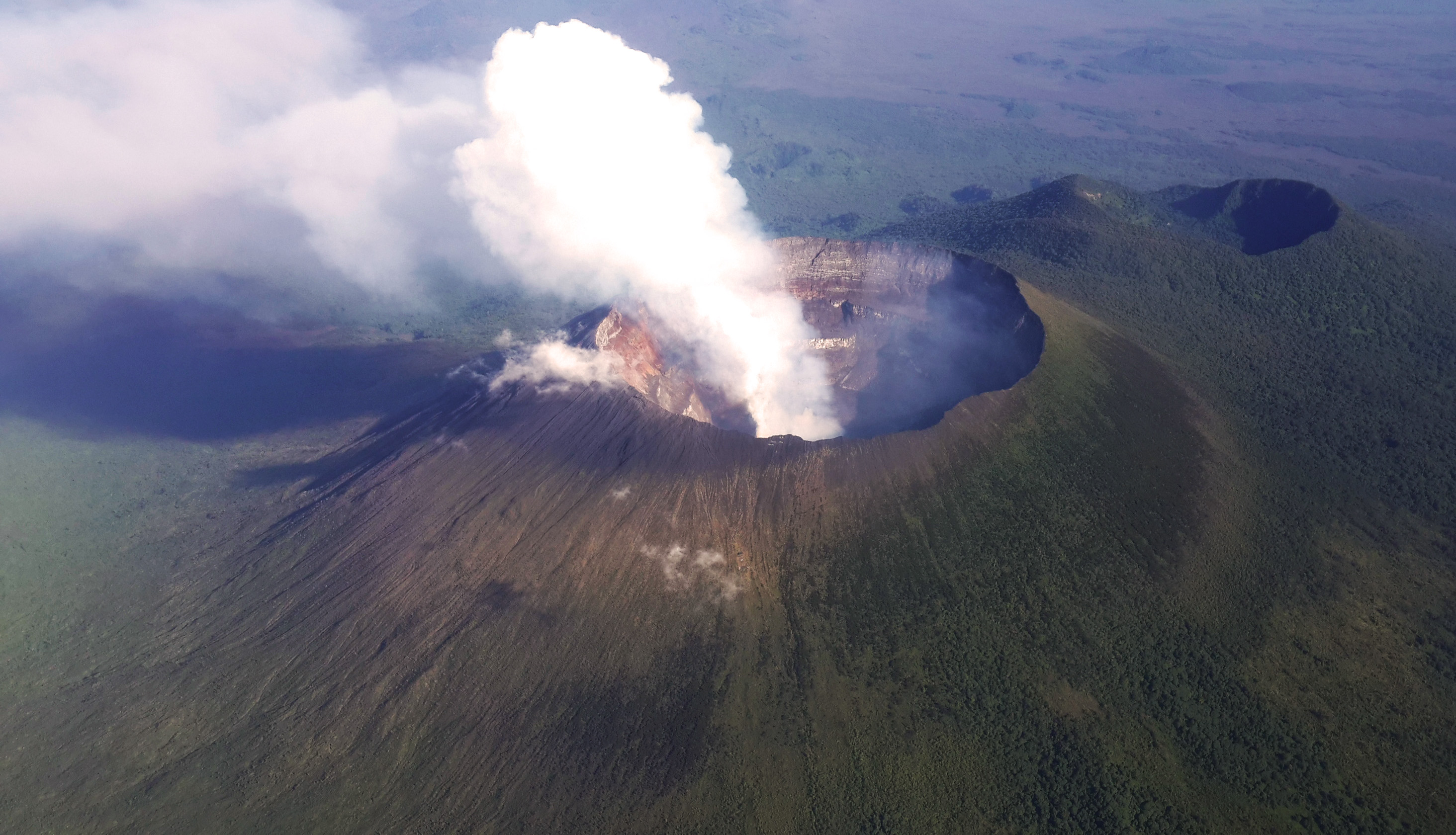
The territory contains Mount Nyiragongo, an active volcano within Virunga National Park.

Nyiragongo Territory is a territory in North Kivu in the eastern Democratic Republic of the Congo. Covering an area of 333 square kilometers, it had a population of 338,966 as of 2022. The territory is bordered to the north by the Bwisha Chiefdom in Rutshuru Territory, to the south by Karisimbi commune in the city of Goma, to the east by Rwanda, and to the west by the Virunga National Park, which separates it from the Bahunde Chiefdom in Masisi Territory.

Established by presidential ordinance on 20 August 1998, with administrative foundations dating back to District Commissioner's Order No. 58 of 22 June 1929, Nyiragongo Territory is composed solely of Bukumu Chiefdom. This chiefdom is further divided into seven groupements, which are subdivided into 58 villages. The territory is historically governed by the Kumu people, but its population is ethnically diverse, including the native Shi, Nande, Hunde and the Congolese Banyarwanda as well as other ethnic groups.

== Geography ==
=== Topographical relief and geology ===
Nyiragongo Territory, named after its active volcano, is characterized by a diverse and rugged topography. Covering 333 square kilometers, more than half of its land area (170 square kilometers) lies within Virunga National Park, while the remaining 163 square kilometers is inhabited by the local population. With an average elevation of 2,000 meters, the landscape consists primarily of a plateau that appears as a vast, slightly inclined plain, surrounded by towering mountains that shape its natural environment. The highest point in the territory is found in the Hehu Mountains, reaching approximately 2,430 meters. Other notable peaks include Mount Mikeno (4,437 m), Mount Karisimbi (4,506 m), Mount Nyiragongo (3,470 m), and Mount Nyamulagira (3,058 m). While the eastern part of the territory is home to the dormant volcanoes Karisimbi, Mikeno, and Visoke, the western region contains the active volcanoes Nyiragongo and Nyamulagira. The northern sector of Nyiragongo Territory is marked by several hills, including Kanyengunzu, Kiringo, Butobya, Ruhunda, Nyondo, Rwimisambi, Kabatwa, Kombe, and Bizuru. The region also contains numerous caves, such as Nyambata, Gihari, Ngobera, Kanangobera, Kagera, and Kiroko. The volcanic origin of the land has resulted in fertile soil, particularly where lava has decomposed into nutrient-rich earth. Sand quarries are located in the Munigi groupement, while clay quarries can be found in the Buvira and Rusayo groupements, though their exploitation remains minimal.

=== Vegetation and hydrology ===
The territory's vegetation is sparse due to limited water availability, with only a few shallow-rooted plant species. However there are some areas dotted with shrubs in the Kibumba groupement. Agriculture plays a crucial role in shaping the landscape, as local farmers cultivate gardens and crops that enhance the region's appearance.

Nyiragongo Territory lacks rivers, lakes, or perennial streams. A swamp is located within Virunga National Park, to the north of the territory near Mount Mikeno. During the dry season, residents of Kibumba and Buhumba rely on this swamp, which is about five kilometers from their settlements. However, water shortages occur during severe droughts when the water level recedes.

=== Climate ===
Nyiragongo Territory's climate is directly influenced by its relief, with temperatures ranging between 15°C and 30°C and elevations varying from 125 meters to 2,700 meters. Precipitation is abundant and increases with altitude, though its distribution throughout the year varies. Bukumu Chiefdom experiences a temperate climate with two primary seasons: the dry season and the rainy season. In the northern region, rainfall is nearly constant, with a brief dry spell in June and July. The southern region, at an altitude comparable to Goma (1,493 meters), follows a more complex climatic pattern, featuring four distinct seasons: a major rainy season in November, a long dry season in May and June, a shorter dry period in January and February, and a brief rainy season in March and April.

=== Administrative division ===
Nyiragongo Territory was formally established by a presidential ordinance on 20 August 1998, with administrative foundations dating back to District Commissioner's Order No. 58 of 22 June 1929. The territory is governed by a Territorial Administrator, assisted by two Assistant Territorial Administrators. These officials, appointed by the Ministry of the Interior and Security, oversee the implementation of state policies at the local level under the supervision of the provincial governor, who acts as the representative of both the President and the Ministry.

Administratively, the territory consists of a single chiefdom, Bukumu Chiefdom, which is led by a customary chief, known as the mwami. The mwami, a descendant of the region's traditional rulers, is supported by an Administrative Secretary, an Accounting Receiver, and other sectoral service officials. While the mwami is selected from the royal family in accordance with customary traditions, he remains subordinate to the Territorial Administrator, who holds the official authority.

Bukumu Chiefdom is divided into seven groupements, which are further subdivided into 58 villages (localités).

Groupements
1.	Buvira
2.	Kibumba
3.	Kibati
4.	Mudja
5.	Munigi
6.	Rusayo
7.	Buhumba

=== Volcanic activity ===
Nyiragongo is the most active volcano in the eastern Democratic Republic of the Congo and one of the few stratovolcanoes in the world that hosts a quasi-permanent lava lake. It is located within the western branch of the East African Rift, specifically in the Virunga Volcanic Province (VVP) of central Kivu. The volcano is situated along the main north-south axis of the rift, and its activity is sometimes linked to the dynamics of the rifting process.

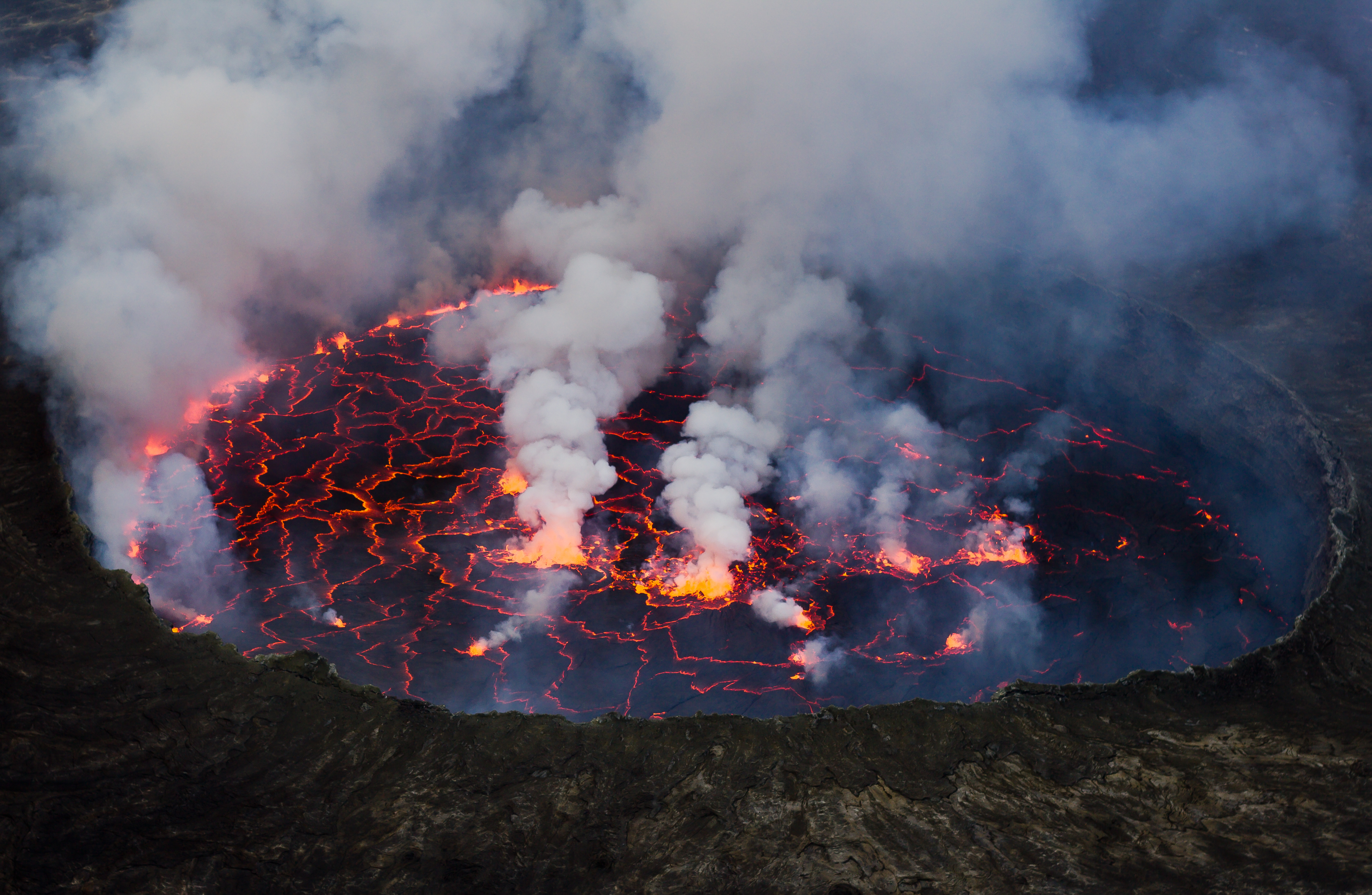
Lava Lake of the Mount Nyiragongo in Virunga National Park

Nyiragongo has experienced several major fissure eruptions in recent decades, with significant lava flows originating from its flanks rather than the central crater. These flank eruptions occurred on 10 January 1977; 17 January 2002; and most recently on 22 May 2021. In contrast, most of Nyiragongo's volcanic activity takes place within its crater, where an actively overturning lava lake is frequently observed. Notable intra-crater eruptions include the reactivation of the lava lake on 23 June 1994, after a period of dormancy, as well as the formation of a new eruptive vent on 28 February 2016, which triggered a sequence of volcanic earthquakes. From 2016 to 2021, the lava lake remained continuously active until it drained during the 2021 eruption, when lava effusion from a lateral vent reached several kilometers southeast of the volcano. The lava lake was briefly reactivated on 28 September 2021, persisting until December of that year.

Monitoring Nyiragongo's volcanic activity and predicting potential eruptions require a multi-parameter approach, incorporating gas emissions, seismicity, and ground deformation. Variations in sulfur dioxide (SO_{2}) emissions, in particular, serve as key indicators of changes within the magmatic system. The installation of a mini-DOAS (Differential Optical Absorption Spectroscopy) station near the volcano has facilitated continuous monitoring of SO_{2} release, which can provide insights into magma ascent. Despite this, the abrupt 2021 eruption, which exhibited few obvious precursory signals, has prompted further research into Nyiragongo's seismicity and degassing patterns. Studies conducted between 2014 and 2017 indicate that the volcano maintains a nearly constant background tremor and low levels of SO_{2} outgassing, underscoring the need for improved monitoring techniques to better anticipate future eruptions.

== Economy ==
=== Agriculture and livestock ===
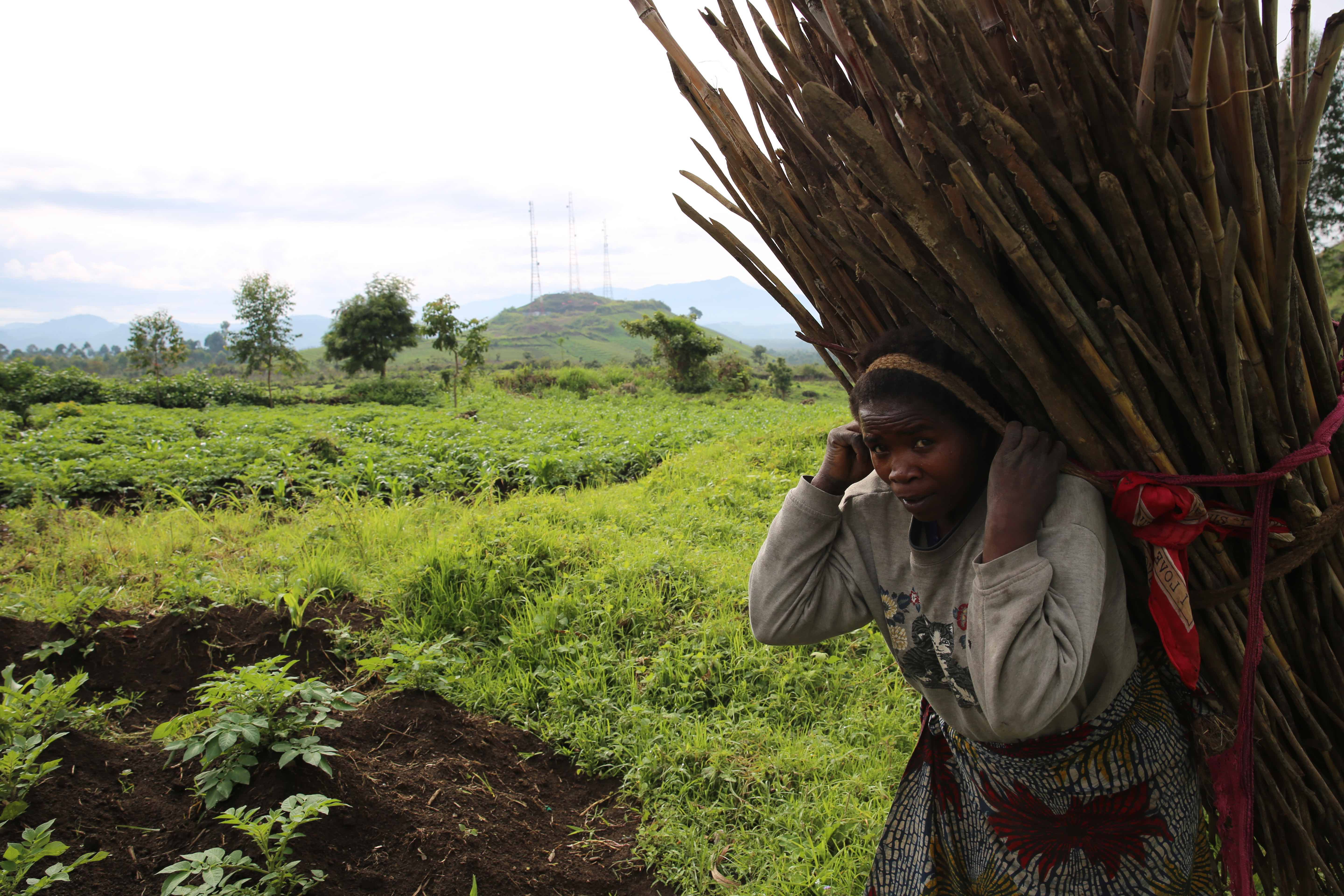
A woman carrying a heavy load on her back in Nyiragongo Territory

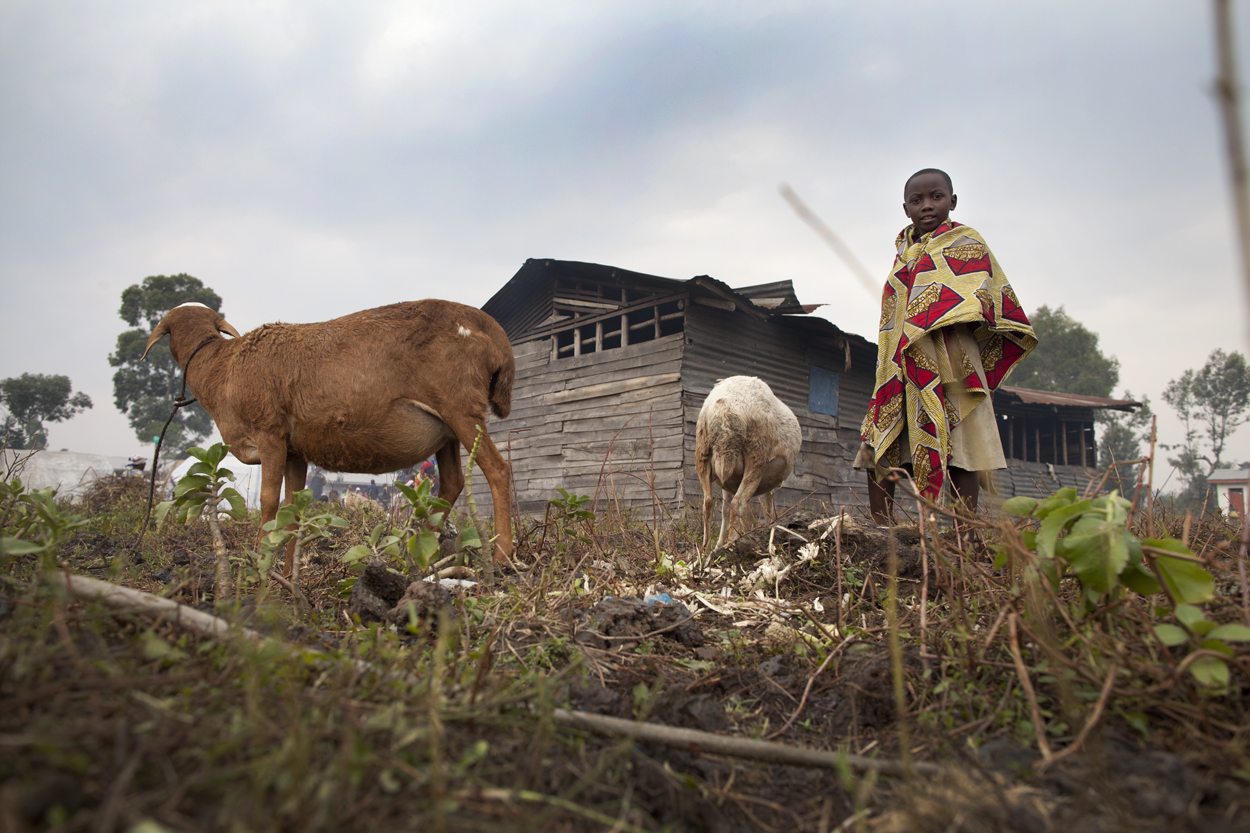
A young girl from Kibumba groupement stands near two sheep in Kanyaruchinya displaced persons camp, 4 km north of Goma

Agriculture is the primary economic activity. However, despite the population's reliance on farming, agricultural productivity remains limited due to small landholdings. Most farming households cultivate an average of 0.6 hectares, which restricts overall output and often leads to food insecurity, particularly during lean periods before harvests. The agricultural sector is characterized by monoculture, with beans predominating in the south and market gardening in the north. The most commonly grown crops include bananas, beans, maize, sweet potatoes, carrots, leeks, onions, cabbages, and potatoes. In some areas, eucalyptus trees are planted for various uses. Wheat and peas were previously cultivated but are gradually disappearing due to a lack of awareness and declining interest among farmers. The land tenure system in the territory is largely feudal, with a significant portion of the population working as sharecroppers. More than 50% of the land is cultivable, while the presence of volcanic rock in some areas renders agricultural and livestock activities unfeasible. These rocky areas, however, serve as valuable quarries for building stones, which provide employment opportunities, particularly for the indigenous Pygmy communities, given the demand for construction materials in Goma.

Livestock farming is another important economic activity, despite the limited availability of pastureland. Goat rearing is widespread, while cattle breeding faces greater challenges due to land constraints. The only designated pasture reserve is located in the Buhumba groupement, where cattle are concentrated. During dry periods, herders move their cows southward in search of water, often leading to conflicts with farmers when livestock damage banana plantations. Other livestock raised in the territory include sheep, pigs, chickens, and rabbits. Periodic volcanic eruptions further impact agricultural and livestock activities, as lava flows reduce the amount of arable land.

=== Trade and commerce ===
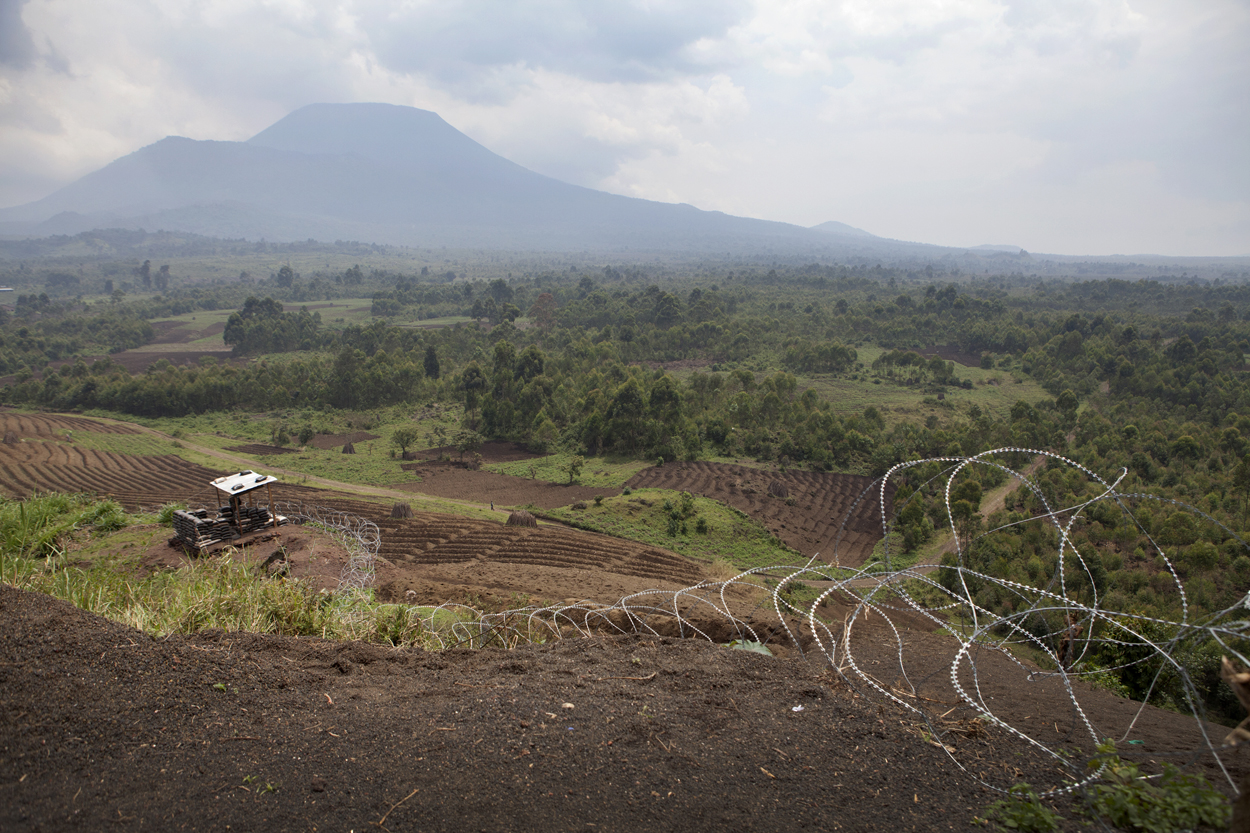
Kibati, Nyiragongo Territory

The commercial sector remains largely underdeveloped, with most of the population engaged in informal, small-scale trade. There are no established shopping centers, major trade networks, or registered businesses, and economic activity is primarily concentrated in local markets. The most significant market is in Ruhunda, located in the Kibumba groupement, while markets in Munigi and Mudja have ceased operations due to declining customer demand.

Trade is largely oriented toward Goma, where residents procure finished and consumer goods. Farmers supply Goma and Rutshuru Territory with vegetables such as cabbages, leeks, spinach, carrots, and various herbs used in modern cuisine. However, long-distance trade has diminished, with orders from Kinshasa and Kisangani becoming infrequent since the eruption of Mount Nyiragongo on 17 January 2002, which damaged part of Goma International Airport. Key commercial products include Kasikisi (a traditional banana beer), firewood, construction wood, and charcoal, much of which is sourced from Virunga National Park. The park's resources are often exploited by foreign armed groups. Agricultural produce, including beans, bananas, sweet potatoes, potatoes, and various vegetables, also contributes to the local economy.

=== Fishing, hunting, and tourism ===
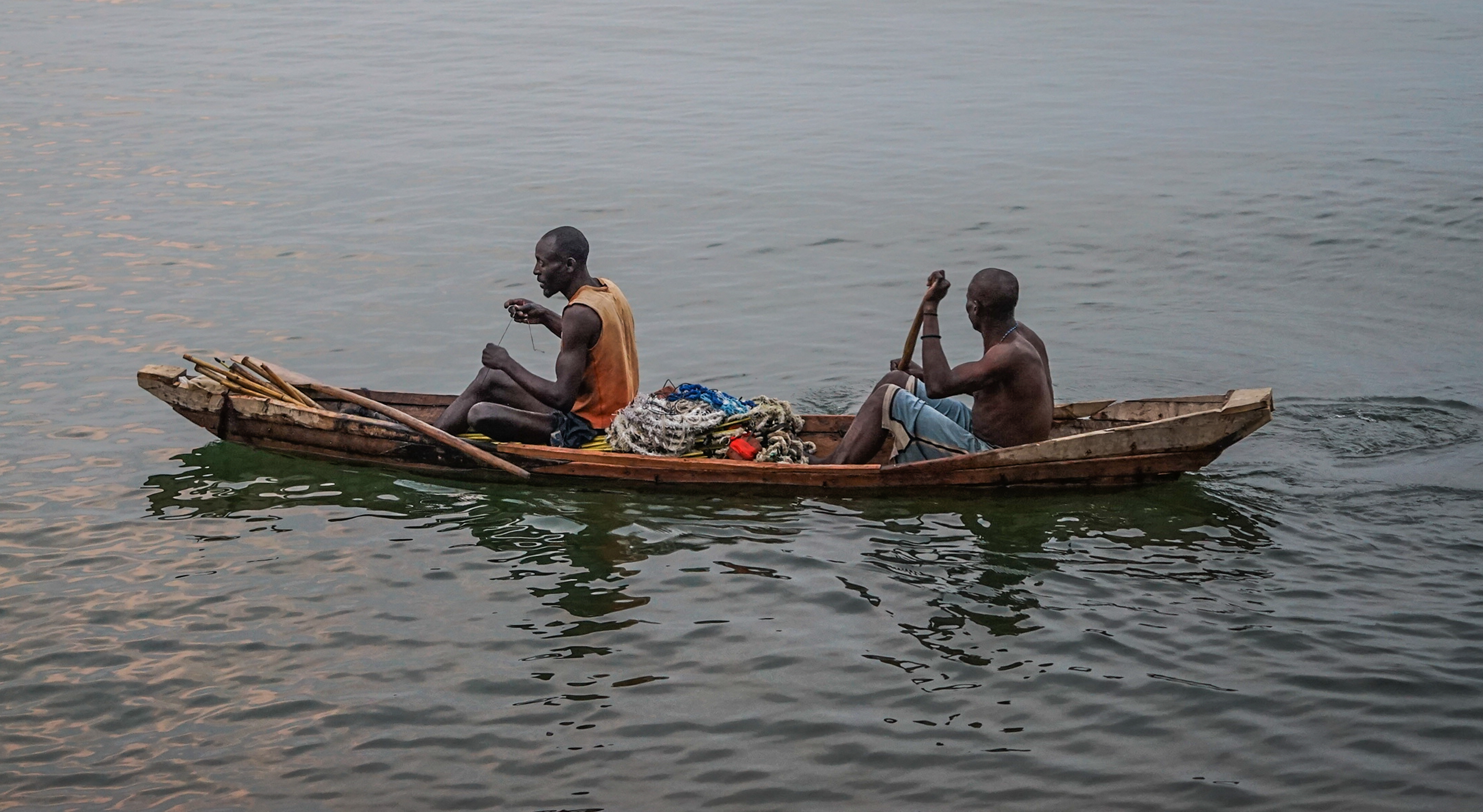
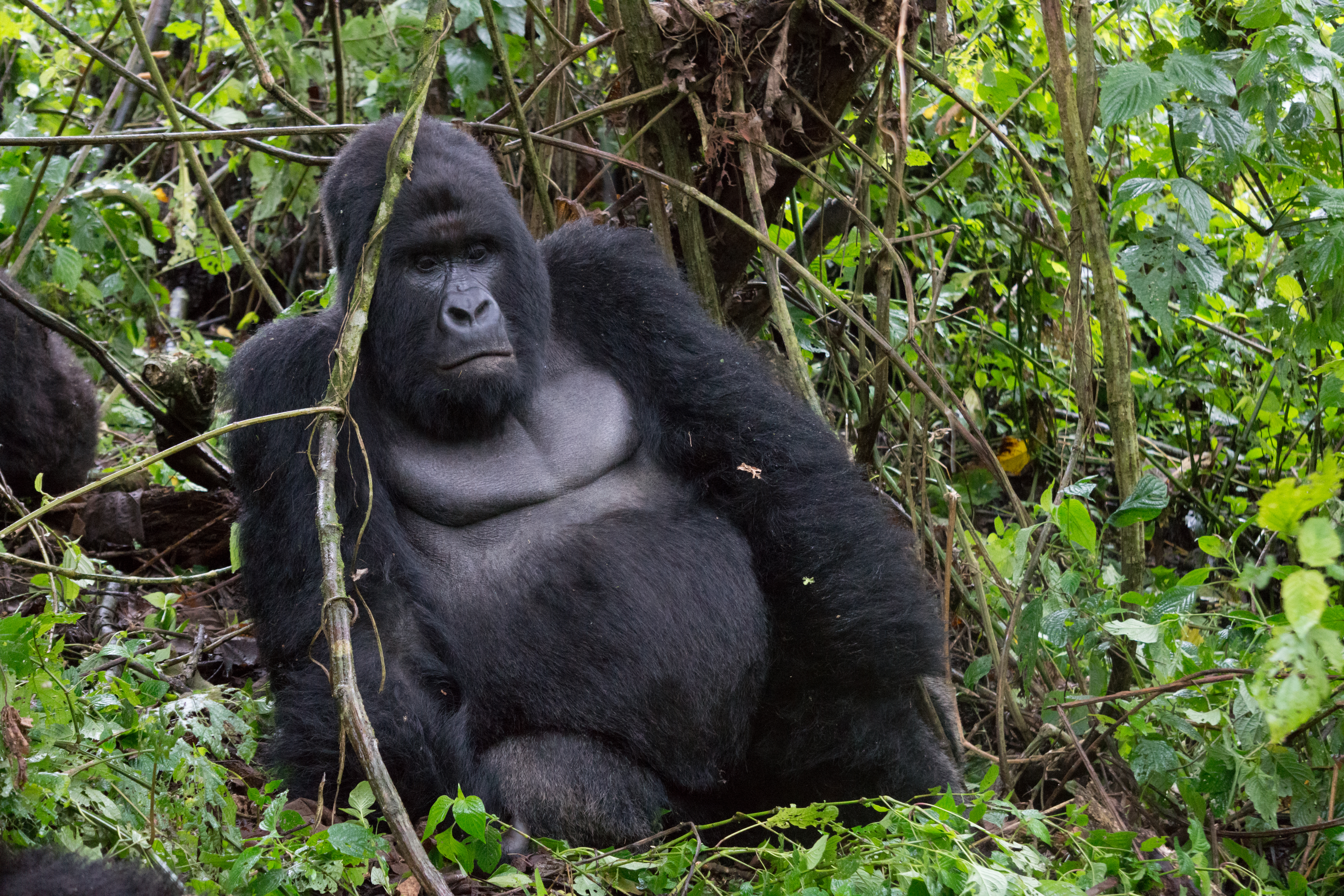
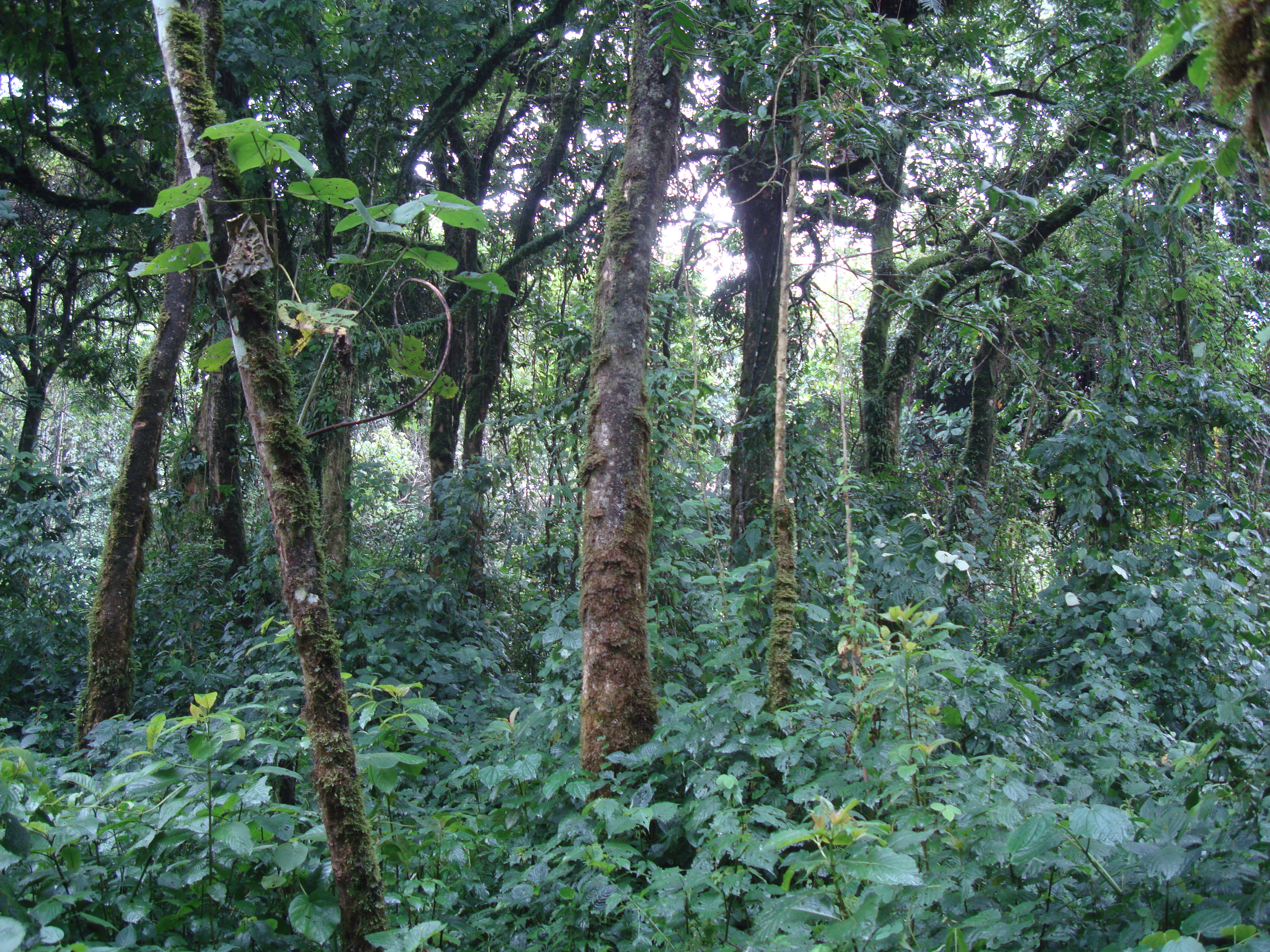
Virunga National Park

Fishing is not a viable economic activity in Nyiragongo Territory due to the absence of lakes, rivers, or perennial water sources.

Hunting, though officially prohibited by the Institut Congolais pour la Conservation de la Nature (ICCN), continues to be practiced, particularly by indigenous Pygmy communities who rely on it for subsistence. These groups engage in small-scale hunting and gathering within Virunga National Park, despite legal restrictions. In recent years, hunting has been largely reduced to the capture of small wild rodents.

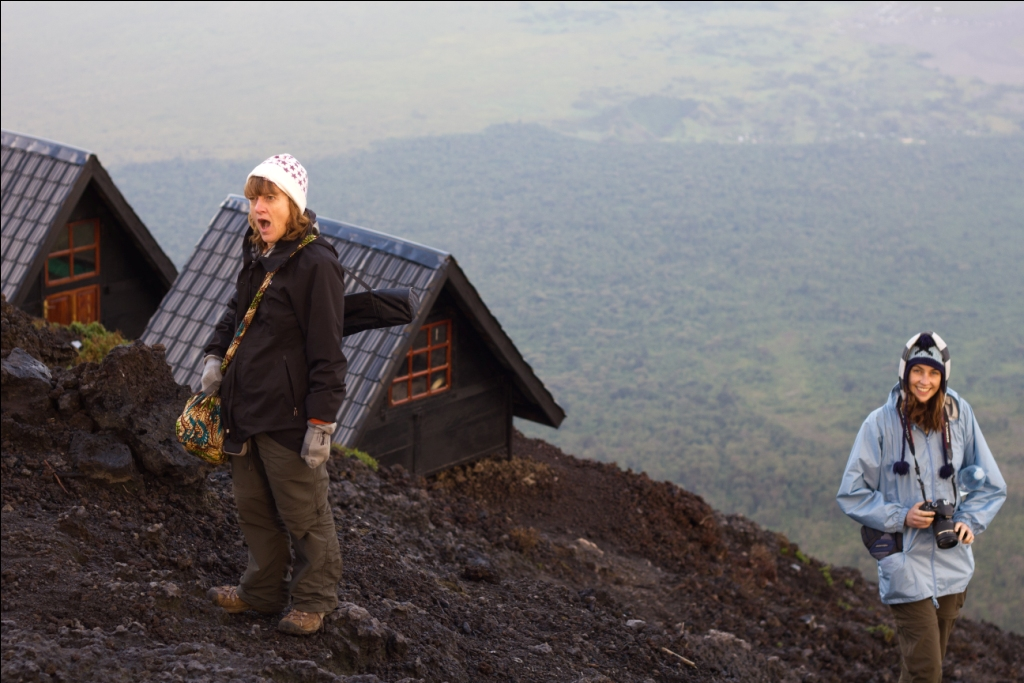
Nyiragongo crater cabanas, perched on the edge of the crater with a direct view of the boiling lava lake

Tourism has potential in the territory, as it borders Virunga National Park, home to various natural attractions. Notable sites include the active Nyiragongo volcano, the extinct Mikeno and Karisimbi volcanoes, and a rich array of plant and animal biodiversity, including the critically endangered mountain gorilla, which attracts international interest. Historical landmarks include a World War I cemetery marked by a signpost in Nyakabanda, located in the Kibati groupement along the Goma-Rutshuru road. Tourist infrastructure remains limited, with the sole accommodation facility being a lodge in Kilimanyoka. This lodge serves as a resting point for visitors exploring the Nyiragongo volcano, under the supervision of Virunga National Park rangers. Despite its natural attractions, the tourism sector faces challenges due to regional insecurity and limited investment in hospitality services.

== Culture ==
=== Demographics ===
Nyiragongo Territory has experienced significant population growth over the past decade. In 2011, it had a population of 67,208, with a high population density of 412 inhabitants per square kilometer. By 2022, the population had surged to 338,966, comprising 44,371 men and 49,676 women, along with 115,267 boys and 129,652 girls under the age of 18.

=== Education and healthcare ===
Educational progress has been historically limited, partly due to past societal constraints and governance issues that discouraged intellectual advancement. Many residents seeking better educational opportunities relocated to other areas. However, in recent years, there has been a growing emphasis on education, with an increasing number of families striving to secure diplomas for their children. Despite this positive shift, the territory still faces significant challenges, including an insufficient number of schools. The local population has called on the government to invest in expanding educational infrastructure to accommodate the growing demand for quality learning conditions.

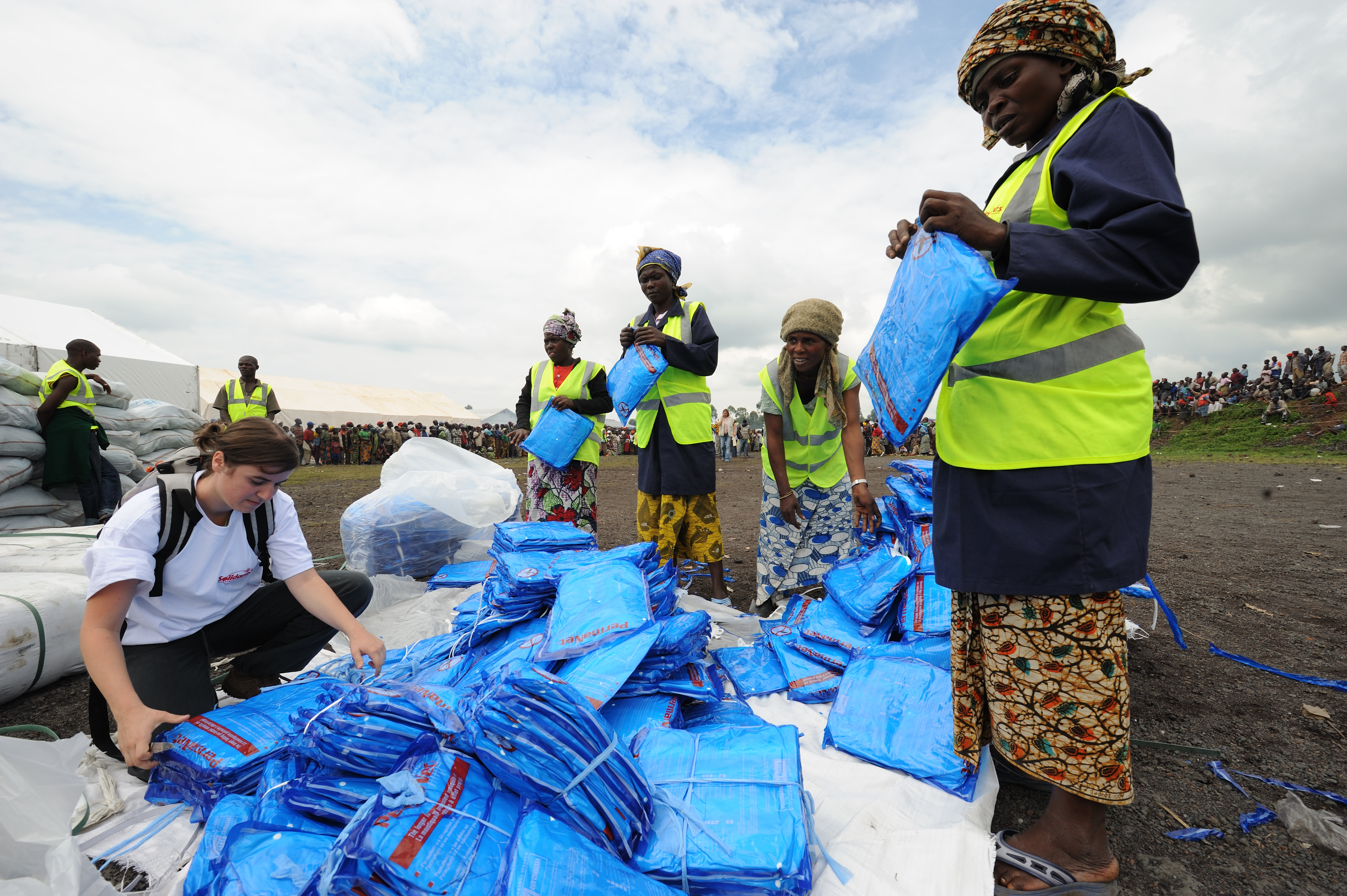
Distribution of plastic sheets, blankets, jerrycans, soap, and cooking sets to thousands in Kibati

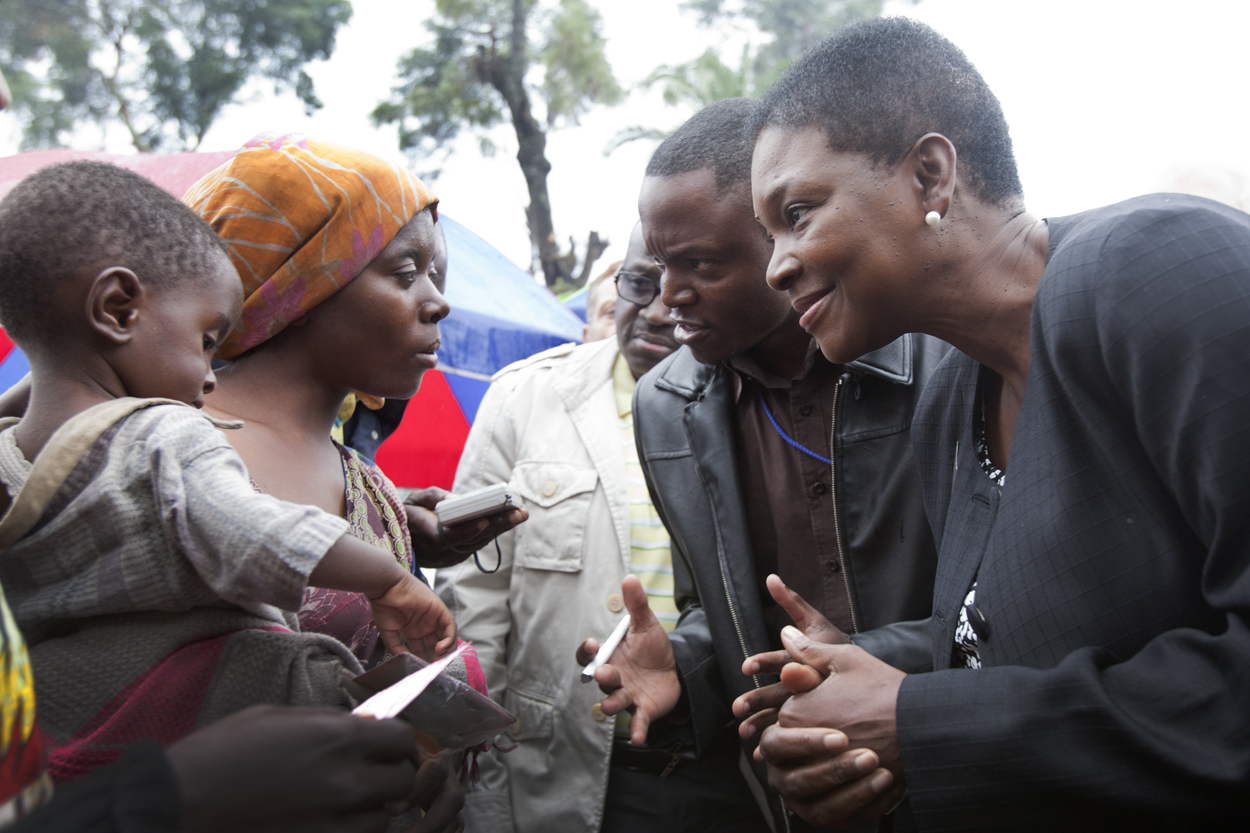
Under-Secretary for Humanitarian Affairs Valerie Amos visits the Kanyaruchinya IDP camp on the outskirts of Goma, where thousands of Rutshuru Territory residents sought refuge after fleeing clashes between FARDC and M23 rebels

Nyiragongo Territory operates under the national health system, with four main health centers. The Kanyaruchinya Health Center (Centre de Santé de Kanyaruchinya) has two health posts, while the Mudja Health Center (Centre de Santé Mudja) also operates with two health posts. The Kimbamba Health Center (Centre de Santé de Kimbamba) is equipped with four health posts, and the Kiziba II Health Center (Centre de Santé Kiziba II) functions with three health posts. These health facilities face significant challenges, including inadequate medical supplies, shortages of essential medications, and a lack of proper laboratory equipment. Organizations such as ASRAMES (a nonprofit association supplying quality medicines), the government, and international NGOs, including SODERU and the Bureau Diocésain des Œuvres Médicales (BDOM), have attempted to improve healthcare services in the territory. Additionally, the Entraide Protestante Suisse (EPER) built the Munigi Health Center as a semi-permanent facility. All healthcare institutions in the territory are under the supervision of the Karisimbi Health Zone in Goma.

=== Religion, sports and leisure ===
Christianity is the predominant religion, with Catholicism and Protestantism being the most widely practiced denominations. There is also a small presence of Muslims and members of the Baháʼí Faith, particularly in the Mudja groupement.

The primary sport practiced is association football, which is particularly popular among the youth. Local matches are organized regularly, with community leaders, including the mwami, sometimes providing soccer balls to support the activity. However, the territory lacks adequate sports infrastructure, with most fields in poor condition and limited access to proper equipment and trained personnel.

=== Housing and infrastructure ===
Housing conditions vary by region. In the southern sector, which includes areas such as Rusayo, Mudja, and Kibati (Mutaho), homes are primarily constructed from semi-durable materials, with many structures made of wooden planks. Some houses are built with straw and covered with tarpaulins. In contrast, the northern sector, encompassing the Kibumba and Buhumba groupements, features more durable housing materials.

Infrastructure development remains a challenge, though various roads facilitate agricultural transport and access to settlements. The national road crosses the territory, supplemented by several agricultural access roads rehabilitated by international organizations such as the EPER network, the United Nations Observation Missions in the DRC, and ActionAid. These roads play a key role in supporting the local economy and emergency response efforts, particularly during volcanic eruptions. Telecommunications have also expanded in the territory, with an estimated 70% of the population owning mobile devices.

== Security problems ==
Located in the territory is the town of Kibumba, which is about 20 km north of Goma along the National Road. 2. In November 2022, the town was taken over by M23, with a large number of residents fleeing the fighting. M23 retreated from Kibumba on December 23 as part of the Angolan peace agreement.

In November 2022, 8 deaths were reported in the Rutshuru IDP sites in Nyiragongo territory, North Kivu. Of these victims, a 44-year-old woman and seven children died at Kanyaruchinya Health Center and CBCA Ndosho Hospital.
