= Shangi, Democratic Republic of the Congo =

Shangi
- Location in Democratic Republic of the Congo
- Coordinates: 1°19′15″S 29°29′18″E
- Country: Democratic Republic of the Congo
- Admin. Province: North Kivu
- Territory: Rutshuru
- Groupement: Bweza

Shangi is a settlement in the Rutshuru Territory. It is part of the Bweza groupement.

== History ==
In July 2018, Shangi was the site of deadly clashes between the militias APCLS and Nduma Defense of Congo-Renovated.

On 19 May 2022, M23 rebels attacked MONUSCO peacekeepers at Shangi, as the latter joined the FARDC in counter-insurgency operations. The rebel leadership declared that the attack was in response to a previous joint FARDC-FDLR operation. On 16 June, M23 reportedly captured Shangi alongside many other settlements in the area, while 150 FARDC soldiers escaped across the border to Uganda. A few days later, however, Shangi again became the site of fighting between M23 and FARDC. Several civilians were killed during these clashes. By July, Shangi was firmly under M23 control, with locals being conscripted as porters by the rebels.
