= Rutshuru Territory =

Rutshuru Wilaya ya Rutshuru (Swahili)
- Territory
- Territoire de Rutshuru
- Rutshuru Territory on a map of North Kivu Province
- Location in DR Congo
- Coordinates: 1.187265°S 29.446004°E
- Country: DR Congo
- Province: North Kivu
- Time zone: UTC+2 (CAT)

Rutshuru Territory is a territory in the North Kivu province of the eastern Democratic Republic of the Congo, with headquarters in the town of Rutshuru.

The territory is mountainous, including a large portion of the Virunga National Park, famous for its mountain gorillas.

Rutshuru Territory has long faced persistent security challenges, primarily due to the presence of armed groups and disputes over natural resources. In June 2025, the Congolese human rights organization Badilika (meaning "change" in Swahili) published a report documenting 9,163 serious human rights violations resulting in 6,060 deaths within the territory between 1996 and 2023, with the majority of these abuses attributed to three armed groups with ties to Rwanda: the Alliance of Democratic Forces for the Liberation of Congo (AFDL), responsible for 4,380 violations; the March 23 Movement (M23), with 1,524 violations; and the Democratic Forces for the Liberation of Rwanda (FDLR), implicated in at least 650 cases.

== Location ==
The territory lies in the Albertine Rift between Lakes Edward and Kivu. The Rutshuru River runs north through the territory, emptying into Lake Edward It is bounded on the north by Lubero Territory and Lake Edward. The eastern boundary is the international border with Uganda, and further south with Rwanda. To the south is the Nyiragongo Territory, beyond which is the provincial capital of Goma. To the west is Masisi Territory and Walikale Territory. The strategically important town of Kanyabayonga is just north of the territory on the road from Goma to Butembo. The territory includes a large part of the Virunga Mountains and Virunga National Park, which includes Mount Mikeno, an extinct volcano that rises to 14,557 feet (4,437 m). The territory includes Bwito Chiefdom in the mountainous western section and Bwisha Chiefdom in the lower-lying eastern section.

== Climate ==
The territory is mountainous, with significant variations in climate from one part to another. Some parts are forested, others are mostly savanna with occasional trees. The soil in the south is generally rich and fertile. The climate is temperate and wet in the mountains, with temperatures between 3 °C (37 °F) and 18 °C (64 °F). Average annual rainfall in the south is about 1,800 millimetres (71 in), with two rainy seasons. Further north it is drier, warmer and less fertile.

== Economy ==
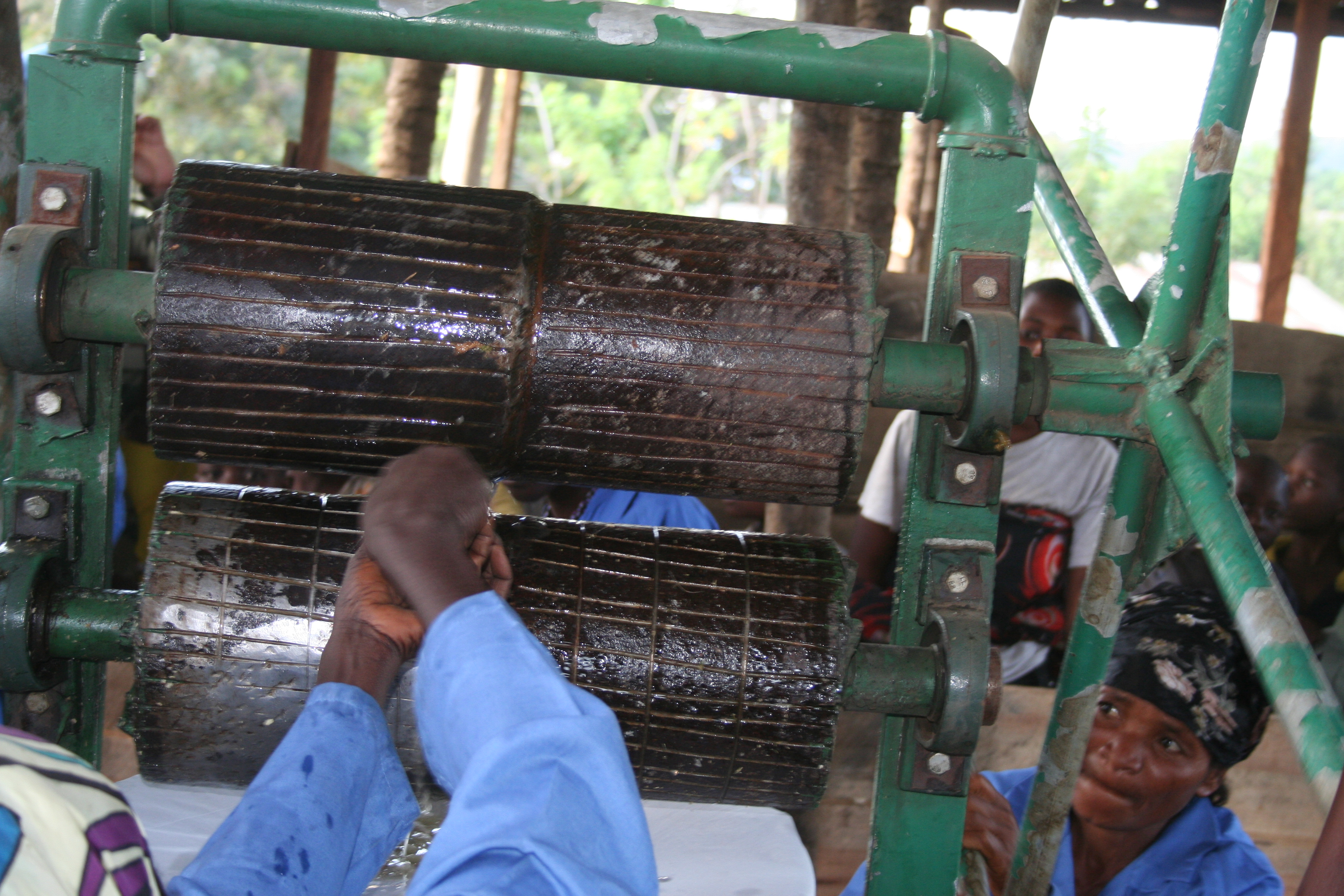
Women work at income generating project in Rutshuru. June 2009

A study of the Bwito district of Rutshuru Territory found that almost all the people lived by agriculture, with most households owning or renting between a half hectare and five hectares of land. Other economic activities include small-scale trading, brewing of banana beer and logging. Before the conflicts that started in 1992, most households raised livestock and measured their wealth in terms of heads of cattle. However, almost all the herds were wiped out during the fighting. The population is extremely poor, and due to the continued insecurity their farming methods minimize risk rather than maximizing profit. Many of the households are headed by a widow.

There have been incidents where elephants from the Virunga National Park have invaded farmlands in the territory, often causing considerable damage. Villagers typically retaliate by killing the animals, or getting soldiers to do the job. The tusks immediately disappear and the elephant is cut up for its meat.

As internally displaced people return, land conflicts have grown to alarming levels. There have been conflicts between ethnic groups, and particularly so as a result of tensions produced by Rwandan Interahamwe entering the region following the 1994 Rwanda Genocide. A number of factors have made the problem worse. At a basic level, there is not enough land to go around. Also, influential people have obtained large landholdings during the period of conflict, and some of these are members of the military or the government. Many people rely on customary law for their land titles, while the government only recognizes formal land certificates. Some of the better-informed have obtained such certificates, displacing the former users of the land.

== Security problems ==
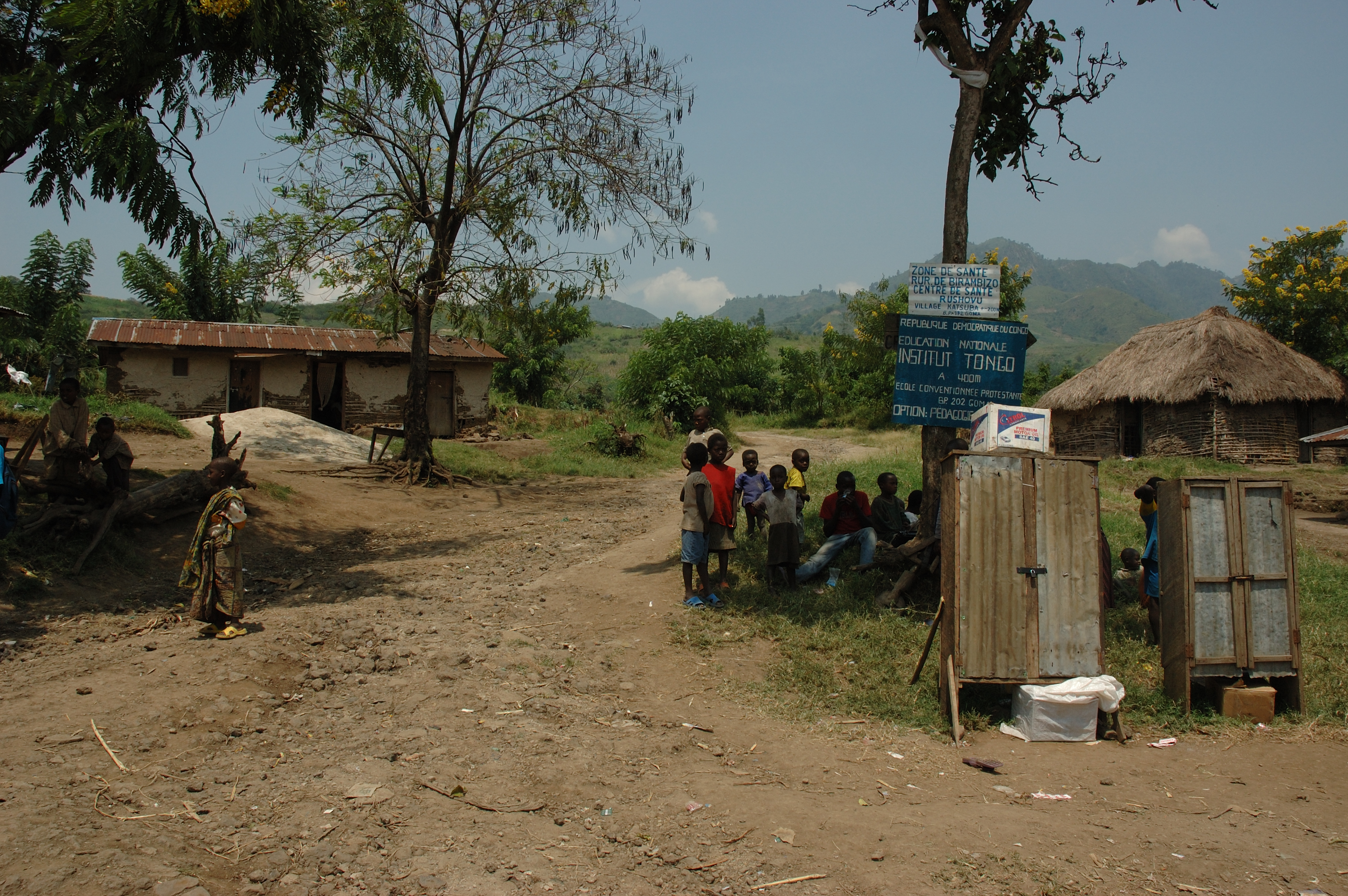
Tongo, scene of fighting in November 2006 between Laurent Nakunda's rebels and national army soldiers. The villagers fled. On their return they found the secondary school, main health centre and many houses looted

Conflict has afflicted Rutshuru territory since inter-ethnic fighting broke out in 1992–1993. The Rwandan Civil War (1990–1993) followed by the Rwandan genocide of 1994 caused many Hutu refugees to enter the region, while the Congolese Tutsi population left for Rwanda. This led to the First Congo War (1996–1997), followed by the Second Congo War (1998–2003). In these wars, Rwanda took an active role in supporting rebels opposed to the government, including supplying troops. Rwanda accused the DRC government of supporting the Interahamwe militia, a Hutu paramilitary force whom had been involved in the Rwandan genocide. An interlude of peace began in 2002.

In 2005 violence flared up again when Laurent Nkunda, an officer in the RCD-Goma rebel group, rejected the authority of the government and retreated with some of the RCD-Goma troops to the Masisi forests to the west. This was the start of the long-running Kivu conflict. A warrant for Nkunda's arrest on charges of war crimes was issued in September 2005. In January 2006 his forces attacked and occupied several towns in Rutshuru Territory including Tongo, Bunagana and Rutshuru. The troops looted the towns and raped or killed civilians who were unable to escape.

In October and November 2008 there was severe conflict in the region between government troops and rebels led by Laurent Nkunda, with an estimated 250,000 people made homeless. Nkunda claimed his CNDP forces were protecting his Tutsi community from attacks by Hutu rebels of the FDLR who fled to the DRC after the Rwandan Genocide. Throughout 2010 there were repeated security incidents. As of September 2010, camps dotted throughout Rutshuru territory held 77,000 internally displaced people.

On 2 June 2011 the United Nations Stabilization Mission in the Democratic Republic of Congo (MONUSCO) launched Operation "Restore Hope" in Rutshuru territory, a concerted drive to suppress violence through 24-hour patrols.

In July 2012, Rutshuru territory was captured by the rebel group March 23 Movement, which will hold it until it is reconquered by the government in October 2013. The following month, President Joseph Kabila, following a 930km journey through the country, visited Rutshuru and gave a speech praising peace.

In November 2022, 8 deaths were recorded in the Rutshuru IDP sites in Nyiragongo territory, North Kivu. Of these victims, a 44-year-old woman and seven children died at Kanyaruchinya health center and CBCA Ndosho hospital.

In February 2023, an makeshift bomb killed a woman and seriously injured another who lost both her legs in a field in the Gisikari Groupement, in the chiefdom of Bwisha in the Rutshuru territory, North Kivu.

== Health and education ==
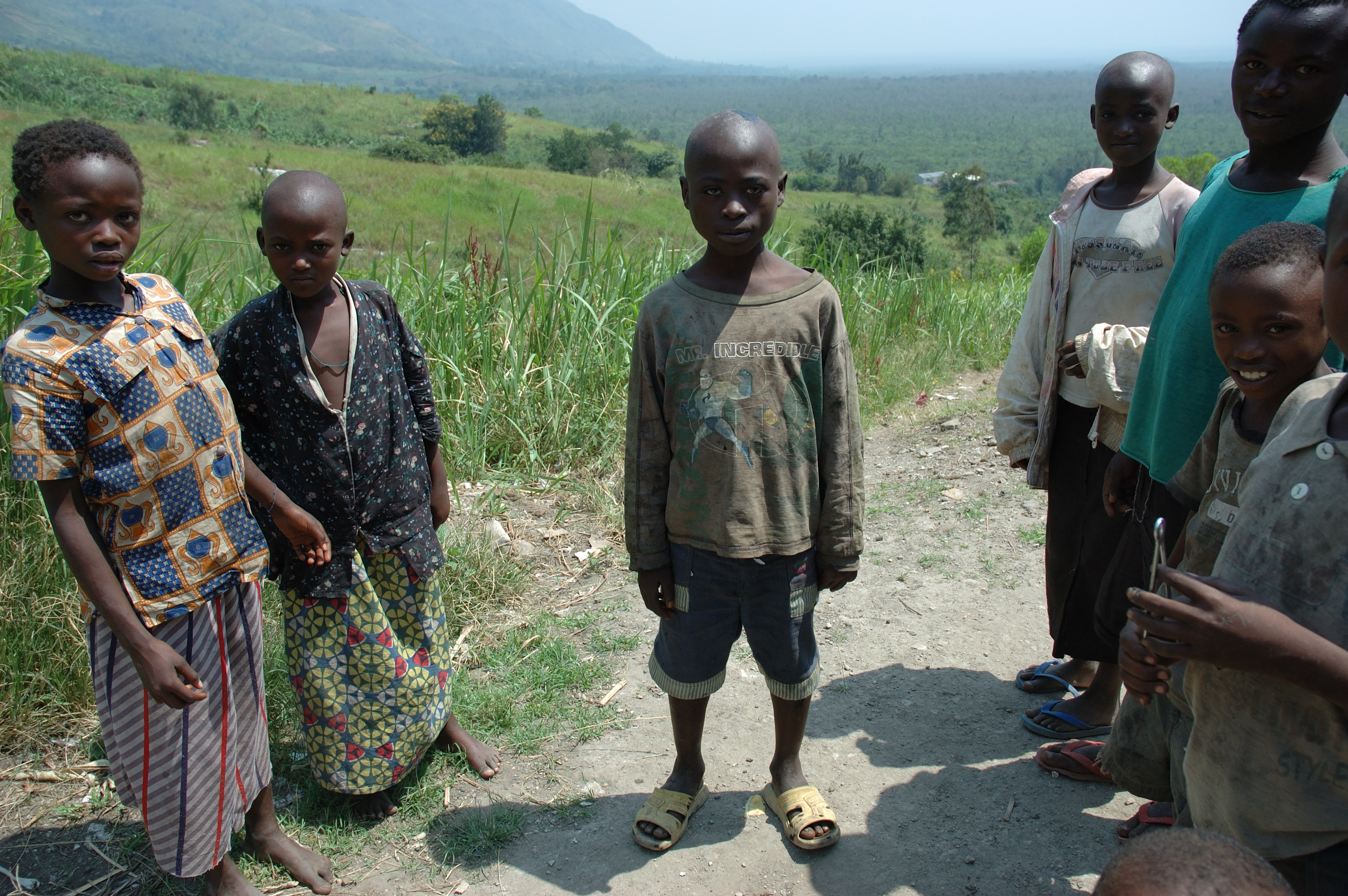
February 2007: Children on a terrace overlooking the plains of the Virunga national park

Many schools in the region have been closed due to the insecurity. School children avoid going to school for fear of being attacked and forcibly recruited into one of the armed groups. Thirty-seven children were recruited in Rutshuru in October 2008. Boys have to fight while girls become "wives" for the soldiers. Some children have been released and then recruited again more than once. By November 2008, 85% of the 310 schools in Rutshuru territory were closed. An estimated 150,000 children were out of school.

== Known settlements ==
- Bunagana
- Rutshuru
- Shangi
