= Bashali Chiefdom =

Chiefdom in Masisi Territory, North Kivu

- Chiefdom
- Chefferie de Bashali
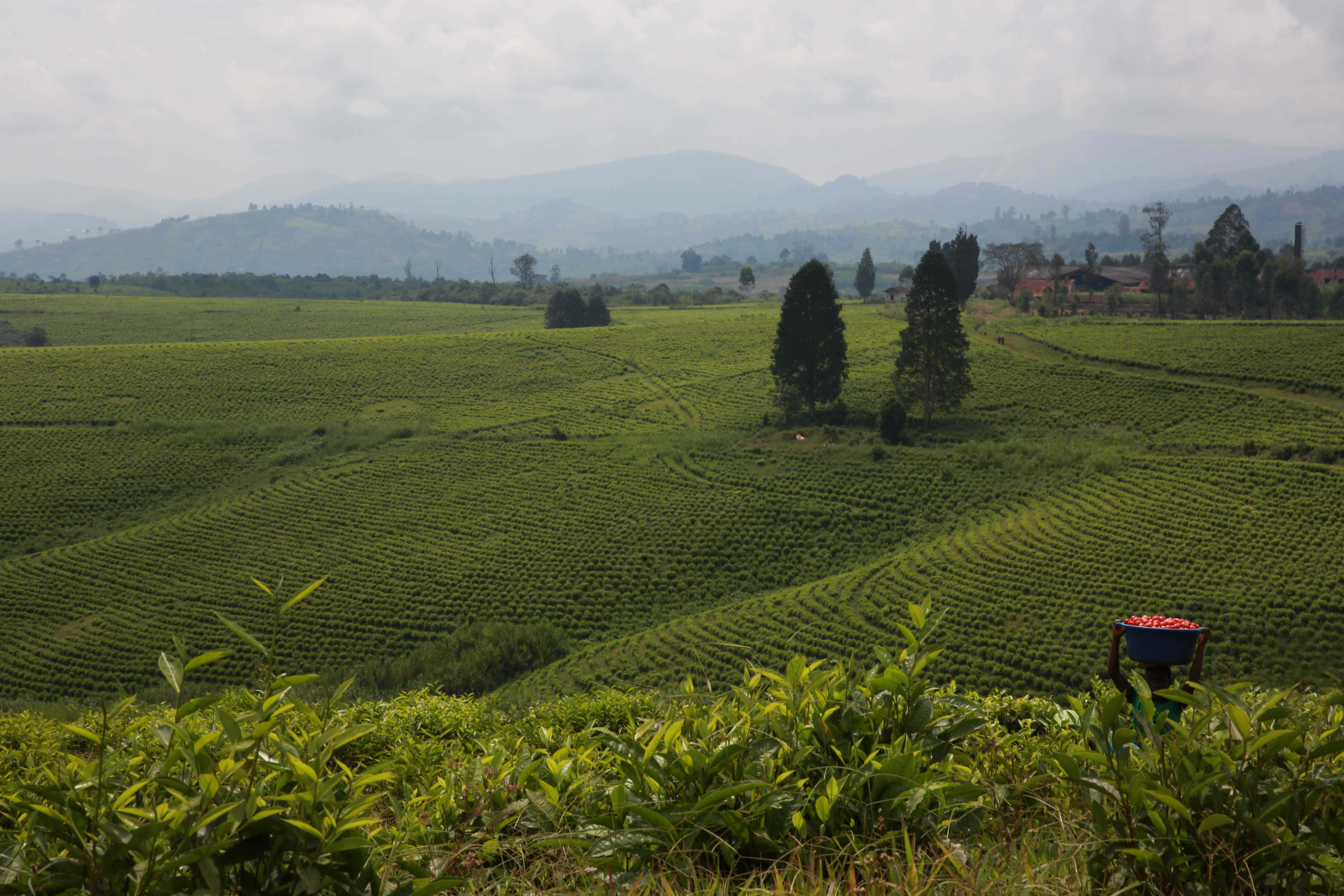
- A terraced tea plantation along the Nyanzale-Kitchanga axis
- Country: Democratic Republic of the Congo
- Province: North Kivu
- Territory: Masisi
- Capital: Kitchanga

Government
  - Mwami: Bashali Mokoto Nyanguba Sylvestre
- Official language: French
- National language: Kiswahili

The Bashali Chiefdom (French: Chefferie de Bashali) is a chiefdom located in the Masisi Territory of North Kivu Province in the eastern region of the Democratic Republic of the Congo (DRC). Topographically, it is bounded to the east by the Virunga National Park, to the north by the Bwito Chiefdom of Rutshuru Territory, to the northwest by Walikale Territory, to the south by the Bahunde Chiefdom, and to the west by the Osso sector. Encompassing a total area of 1,582 square kilometers, the chiefdom is the administrative and sociopolitical structure for the Hunde ethnic group and is administratively subdivided into two groupements: Bashali-Mokoto and Bashali-Kaembe. Kitchanga, the urban center and administrative capital of the Bashali-Mokoto groupement, is the most densely populated locality within the chiefdom.

The region has been perennially beleaguered by incessant conflicts, which have led to widespread violence and large-scale displacement. Adjacent to Kitchanga, the Mungote and Kahe Internally Displaced Persons (IDP) camps accommodate a significant number of displaced people. As of 2015, the Kahe camp housed 5,760 displaced persons, including refugees from Rwanda, while the Mungote camp sheltered 14,599 people.

== Geography ==
The Bashali Chiefdom is strategically situated in the mountainous terrains of North Kivu Province, with an altitudinal range fluctuating between 1,500 and 2,000 meters. The region experiences a distinct pluvial season from September to April, succeeded by an arid season from May to August, which contributes to a climate conducive to a variety of essential agricultural activities. The topography is characterized by its rugged nature, encompassing high mountains, extensive plains, plateaus, and hills. This diverse topography defines the physical landscape and significantly influences anthropogenic activities and settlement patterns. The volcanic soil prevalent in the Bashali Chiefdom is fertile, enriched with a high humus content, making it highly amenable to agricultural use. Additionally, the substratum is replete with valuable mineral resources, such as tourmaline, columbo-tantalite, and cassiterite.

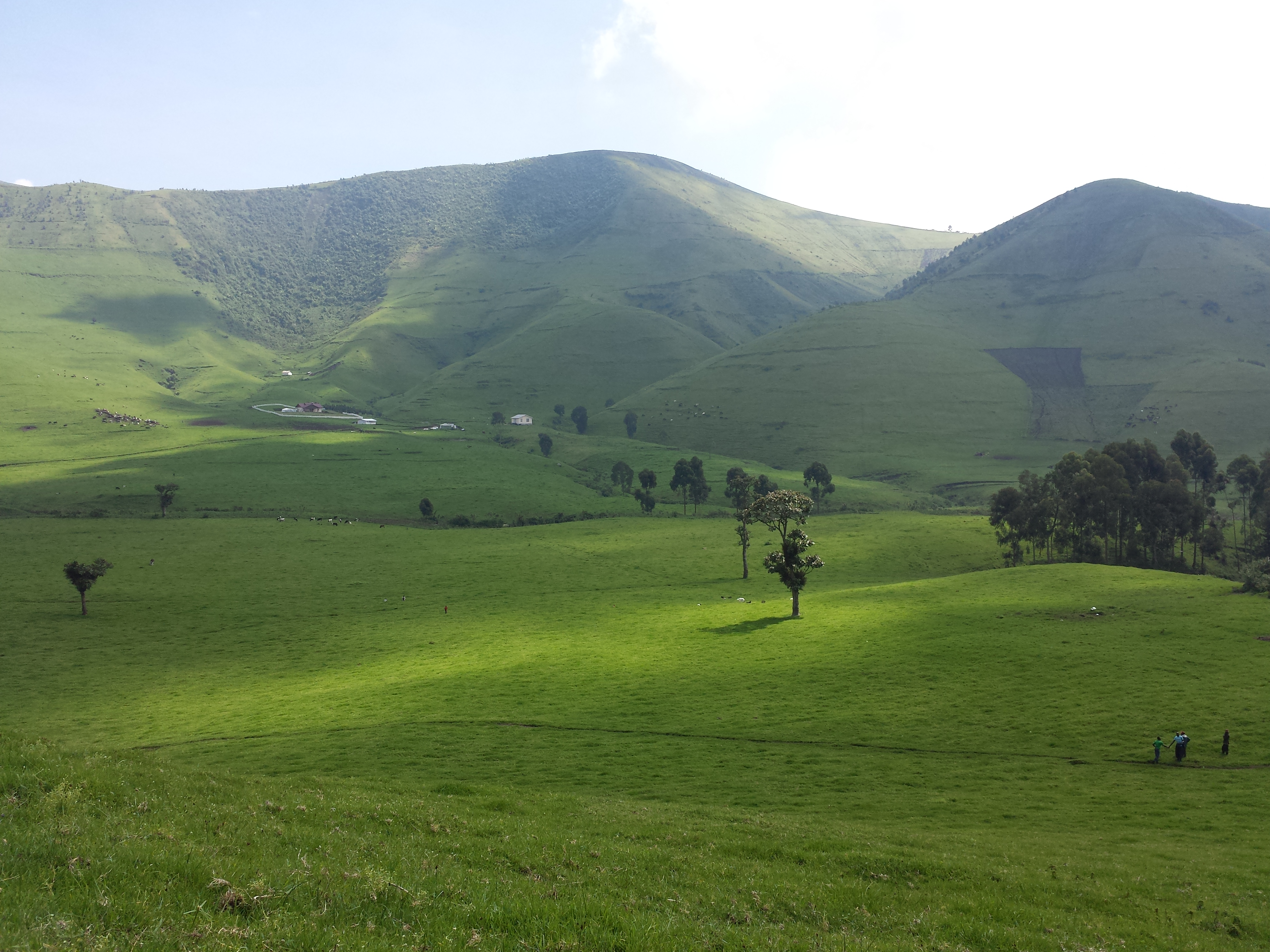
A view of the Masisi hills landscape

The vegetative cover of the Bashali Chiefdom comprises a combination of dense forests and grassy savannahs. The hydrographic network includes numerous rivers and lakes that are indispensable for both the ecosystem and the local communities. Notable rivers such as Osso (Luxoo), Mweso, Muhongozi, Lwama, Rusoma, Rwambi, Twaliba, Bushenge, Bushaala, Luwe, Lweti, Lwitwi, Katalandwa, Kihimba, and Katanda traverse the region. Four significant lakes, Mukoto, Ndalagha, Lukulu, Mbalukira, and Mbita, enrich the region's hydrography. These lakes, drained by the Muhongozi River originating from Kibachiro in the Muhanga locality of the Bashali-Mukoto groupement, are abundant in fish and hold substantial potential for enhancing the socio-economic development of the chiefdom through sustainable fishing practices.

=== Administrative divisions ===
The Bashali Chiefdom is divided into smaller administrative units denominated as groupings (groupements), each overseen by traditional chieftains called "mwamis." These groupements are further subdivided into villages (localités), each administered by customary chiefs. As of 2018, the Bashali Chiefdom comprises two groupements: Bashali-Mokoto and Bashali-Kaembe. Kitchanga serves as the capital of the chiefdom, consolidating a total of 23 localités, including sixteen in the Bashali-Mokoto groupement and seven in the Bashali-Kaembe groupement.

==== Groupements and localités ====
The Bashali-Mokoto groupement consists of 16 localités:

- Kitchanga (the administrative center)
- Muhanga
- Lupfunda
- Mweso
- Kalembe
- Pinga/Bushimoo
- Bulende
- Luhanga
- Kirumbu
- Lwama
- Mulinde
- Lukweti
- Kalungu
- Butale
- Bibwe-Nyange
- Kahira

Bashali-Kaembe groupement consists of 7 localités:

- Burungu
- Nyamitaba
- Lushangi/Burama
- Busihi-Kalonge
- Muxongati
- Lubale-Tunda
- Mutobo

== History ==
=== Early history and Belgian colonial migration polities ===
The area was traditionally inhabited by the Hunde people. During Belgian colonial rule, the Hunde community was reorganized into autonomous entities governed by traditional chiefs who enforced colonial statutes. This form of localized governance provided a facade of autonomy while ensuring the execution of authoritarian colonial mandates.

In the 1930s, the Belgian colonial administration orchestrated a substantial migratory labor movement from the neighboring Ruanda-Urundi territory into the eastern regions of the then-Belgian Congo. This migration was catalyzed by the development of colonial agricultural enterprises in the Belgian Congo and aimed at mitigating population pressures in the densely populated Ruanda-Urundi territory. By 1939, territories within Masisi were expropriated from Bahunde chieftains to resettle approximately 80,000 Hutu Banyarwanda agriculturalists. This influx was further compounded by spontaneous migrations of populations fleeing famine in Rwanda.

In 1940, the colonial administration instituted the Gishari Chiefdom exclusively for the transplanted Banyarwanda populace, which engendered a distinct administrative enclave. This maneuver sparked initial conflicts between the Banyarwanda and indigenous traditional chiefs over the governance of the Gishari enclave. Nonetheless, in 1957, the Belgian administration dissolved the Gishari Chiefdom and amalgamated it into the Bahunde Chiefdom, with Bweremana as its chief town. Subsequent administrative reorganizations culminated in December 1977 with the creation of the contemporary Bashali Chiefdom, segmented into four divisions: Bahunde Chiefdom, Osso Sector, Katoyi Sector, and Bashali Chiefdom.

=== Post-independence ethnic conflicts ===
==== Kanyarwanda War ====
The disbandment of the Gishari Chiefdom resulted in the deprivation of traditional authority among the Banyarwanda of Masisi Territory, leading to a significant impact on their political representation. Following Congo's independence, localized tensions crescendoed into the Kanyarwanda War from 1962 to 1965. During this period, Banyarwanda and indigenous political figures, notably the Nandes, vied for control over the redistribution of the Kivu-Maniéma province. The crux of the conflict revolved around the governance structures of the future provincial assemblies in the newly constituted provinces of North Kivu and Central Kivu. The nationality and political enfranchisement of the Banyarwanda emerged as contentious subjects, leading to powerful centrifugal forces. In September 1962, armed Banyarwanda attacked Hunde communities and police outposts, resulting in ten deaths and a severe military counteraction. The turmoil intensified in late 1963 with the influx of Tutsi herdsmen fleeing the Rwandan Revolution.

The ensuing political purgation in November 1963, characterized by the replacement of Banyarwanda politicians with Hunde counterparts, further inflamed the discord in the Masisi and Rutshuru territories. The legislative and provincial elections of May 1965, marred by irregularities favoring the Hunde, precipitated a dramatic escalation in violence. Hutu Banyarwanda and newly arrived Tutsi refugees clashed with indigenous populations and police forces, leading to widespread chaos, including looting, arson, and massacres. Provincial authorities accused the Banyarwanda of abetting the Mulelist insurrection, prompting a brutal military crackdown by the Armée Nationale Congolaise (ANC). In October 1965, the North Kivu provincial assembly sought to expel all Rwandans, alleging their collusion with Mulelist insurgents. However, this decree was never executed, leaving the underlying tensions unresolved. Although large-scale violence subsided in the ensuing years, localized conflicts over land dispossession and ethnic mistrust persisted.

==== Intensification of tension (1972–1981) ====
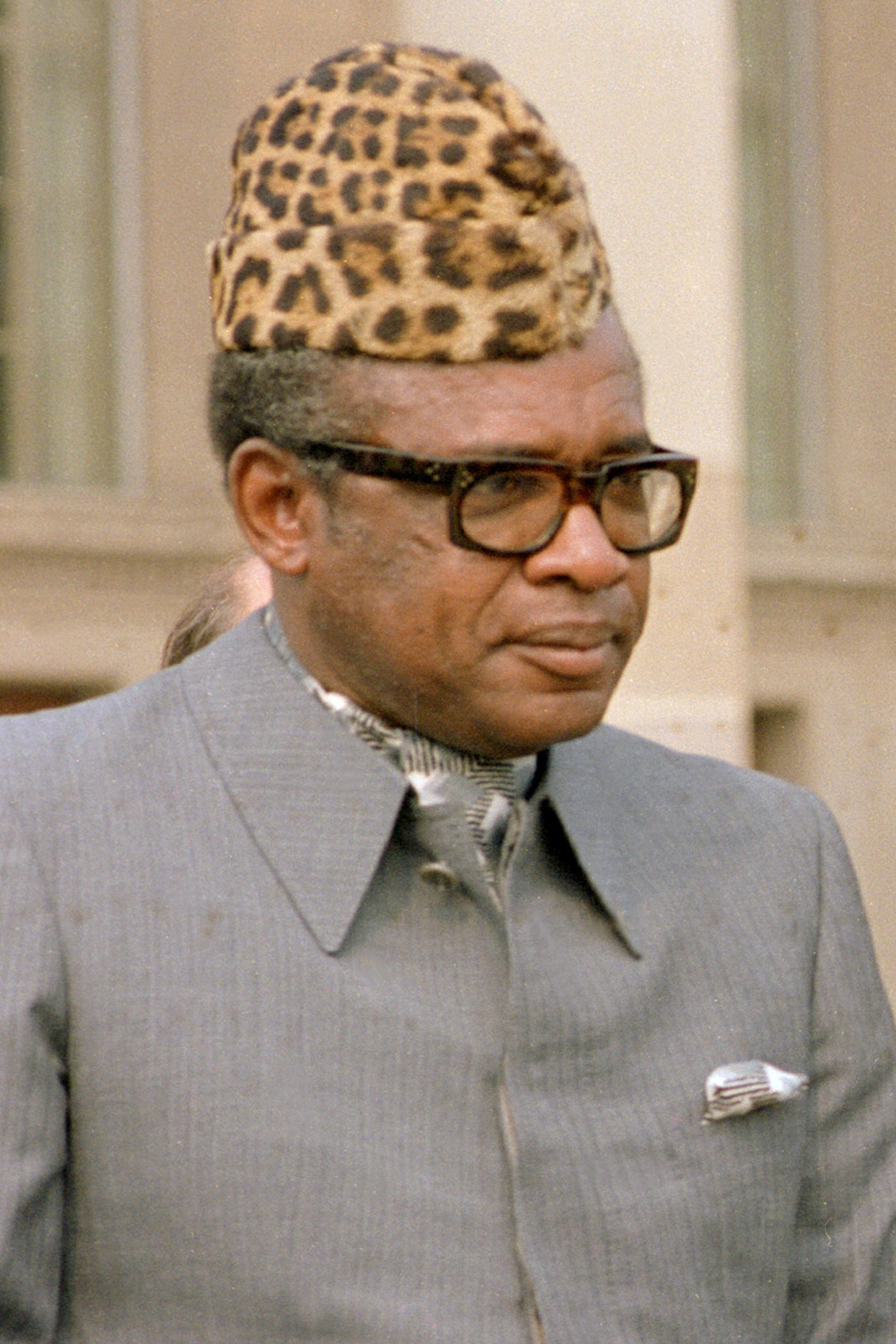
Mobutu Sese Seko sporting a typical abacost in 1983.

Two critical developments between 1972 and 1981 intensified tensions in Masisi Territory. In 1972, Barthélemy Bisengimana Rwema, a Tutsi Zairean and head of president Mobutu Sese Seko's cabinet, influenced the enactment of the first Law on Nationality, granting Zairean nationality automatically to Rwandan migrants who had arrived in Kivu before independence. The 1973 land act, part of the Zairianisation policy, conferred land law benefits to the Banyarwanda, enabling them to secure landholdings through new legal mechanisms. This law facilitated the usurpation of arable land and marginalized indigenous agricultural practices. During this period, the Congolese government initiated a large-scale livestock farming program in North Kivu, supported by international institutions. The economic prospects of cattle farming attracted government officials, merchants, and affluent individuals to North Kivu, leading to a scramble for land that intensified the struggles faced by the crop-farming populations of Masisi.

==== The Masisi War (1990–1993) ====
The Masisi War, which ensued from February 1990s to March 1993, was characterized by intense violence engulfing the Walikale Territory, Masisi Territory, and Rutshuru Territory, with a pronounced focus on the Bwito Chiefdom. The declaration of democratization by Mobutu in April 1990, and the subsequent initiation of the Sovereign National Conference (CNS) in August 1991, reignited ethnic conflicts as Banyarwanda and indigenous factions clashed over representation. The deferment of municipal elections in North and South Kivu, coupled with the "identification of nationals" operation in June 1991, designed to identify voters, encountered violent resistance from armed Hutu contingents who attacked administrative establishments in Masisi, obliterated population registers, and terrorized the teams responsible for the process. These confrontations precipitated skirmishes with law enforcement, resulting in approximately thirty casualties and ultimately culminating in the collapse of the identification initiative. From 1991 to early 1993, large-scale violence abated, yet localized violent incidents persisted.

Assassinations of traditional leaders, larceny of cattle, arson, and the destruction of infrastructure were rampant. Each ethnic group established "self-defense militias," which were armed and organized along ethnic lines. Social relations between Banyarwanda and indigenous people deteriorated further, exacerbated by calls for civil disobedience by Banyarwanda politicians and mutual societies. These groups encouraged the people to withhold taxes from traditional Hunde leaders and manage land autonomously. This epoch also saw the expulsion of indigenous farmers by Banyarwanda neighbors, particularly in areas where they were a minority. Large farmers employed soldiers to guard pastures and herds. On March 20, 1993, violence peaked when groups of young Hunde, Nyanga, and Tembo, likely organized by local politicians, perpetrated the first massacres of Hutu peasants at the Ntoto market in eastern Walikale Territory. This atrocity quickly spread to surrounding villages, sparking a wave of reciprocal violence. Hutu groups from Masisi Territory retaliated by attacking Hunde communities, leading to a brutal cycle of massacres and counter-massacres. The ensuing conflict was characterized by indiscriminate violence, including massacres of civilians, theft of livestock, and the destruction of crops. Both sides aimed to eliminate the traditional leaders of the opposing group, causing massive displacements. Over 200,000 people were forced to move to escape the violence, with many seeking refuge in areas where their ethnic group was in the majority. Estimates suggest that between 7,000 and 14,000 people were killed in six months of intense fighting. The conflict obliterated social cohesion, with each ethnic group retreating into secure areas. Traditional leaders on both sides were targeted, with Hunde leaders fleeing to Goma and Banyarwanda leaders to Rutshuru. Between November 1993 and August 1994, a brief respite in violence was achieved through military intervention by the Special Presidential Division (DSP) and extensive communication efforts involving official actors, civil society, and NGOs. These efforts culminated in a pacification agreement signed by community representatives from Bashali Chiefdom and Bwito Chiefdom.

==== The aftermath of the Rwandan genocide and the First and Second Congo Wars ====
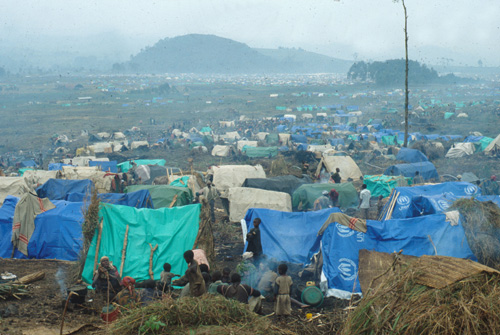
Refugee camp for displaced Rwandans in Kimbumba, 20 km from Goma, Zaire, following the 1994 Rwandan genocide

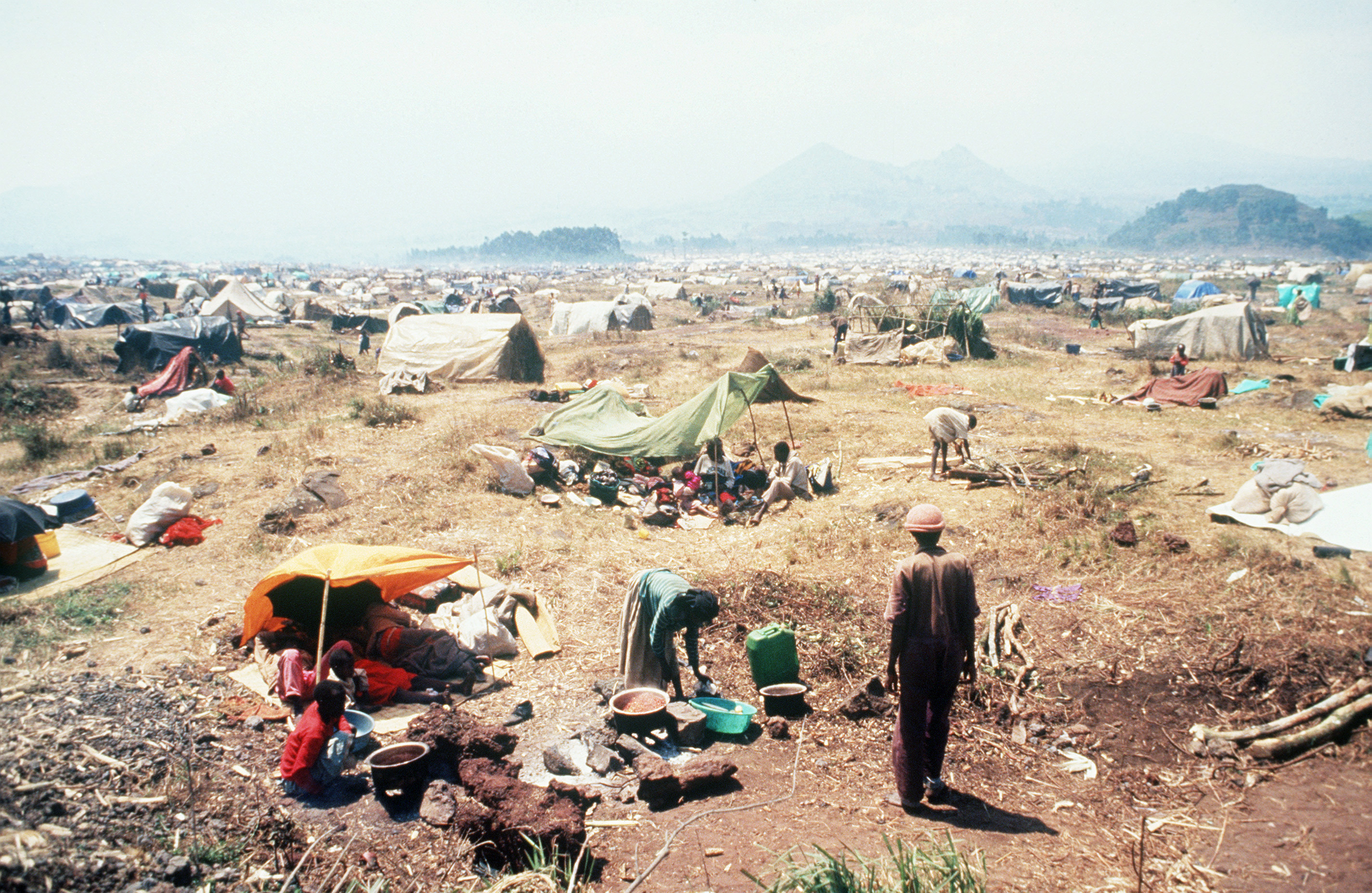
Kibumba refugee camp in Goma on August 3, 1994. Approximately 1.2 million Rwandan refugees fled to Zaire following the outbreak of the Rwandan Civil War.

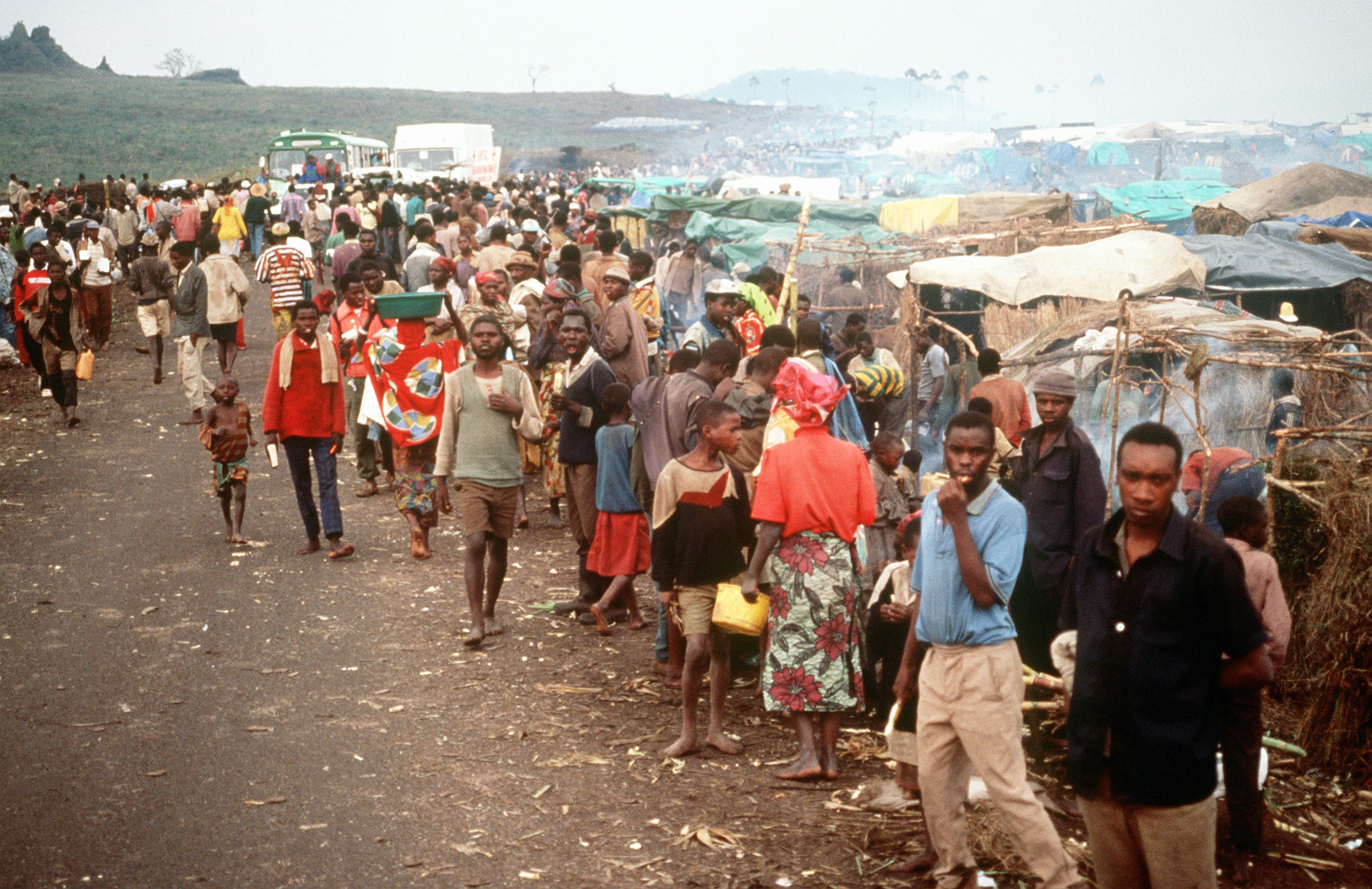
Refugee camp near Goma, Zaire, 1994, providing shelter to those fleeing the Rwandan Civil War.

Following the Rwandan Civil War, an estimated 1.2 million Hutu refugees fled to Kivu, establishing extensive refugee encampments administrated by international humanitarian organizations. These camps, predominantly sheltering Rwandan Hutus, served as operational epicenters for former génocidaires, Hutu civilians, and ex-personnel of the Rwandan Armed Forces. Among these military refugees, some amalgamated into the Forces Démocratiques de Libération du Rwanda (FDLR). The existence of these camps, compounded by cattle rustling from Tutsi livestock proprietors and targeted attacks on certain Hunde communities in proximity to the camps, sparked Masisi's second ethnic war in November 1994. This conflict extended into adjacent Rutshuru and Walikale territories, intensifying violence against the long-integrated Tutsis in Kivu.

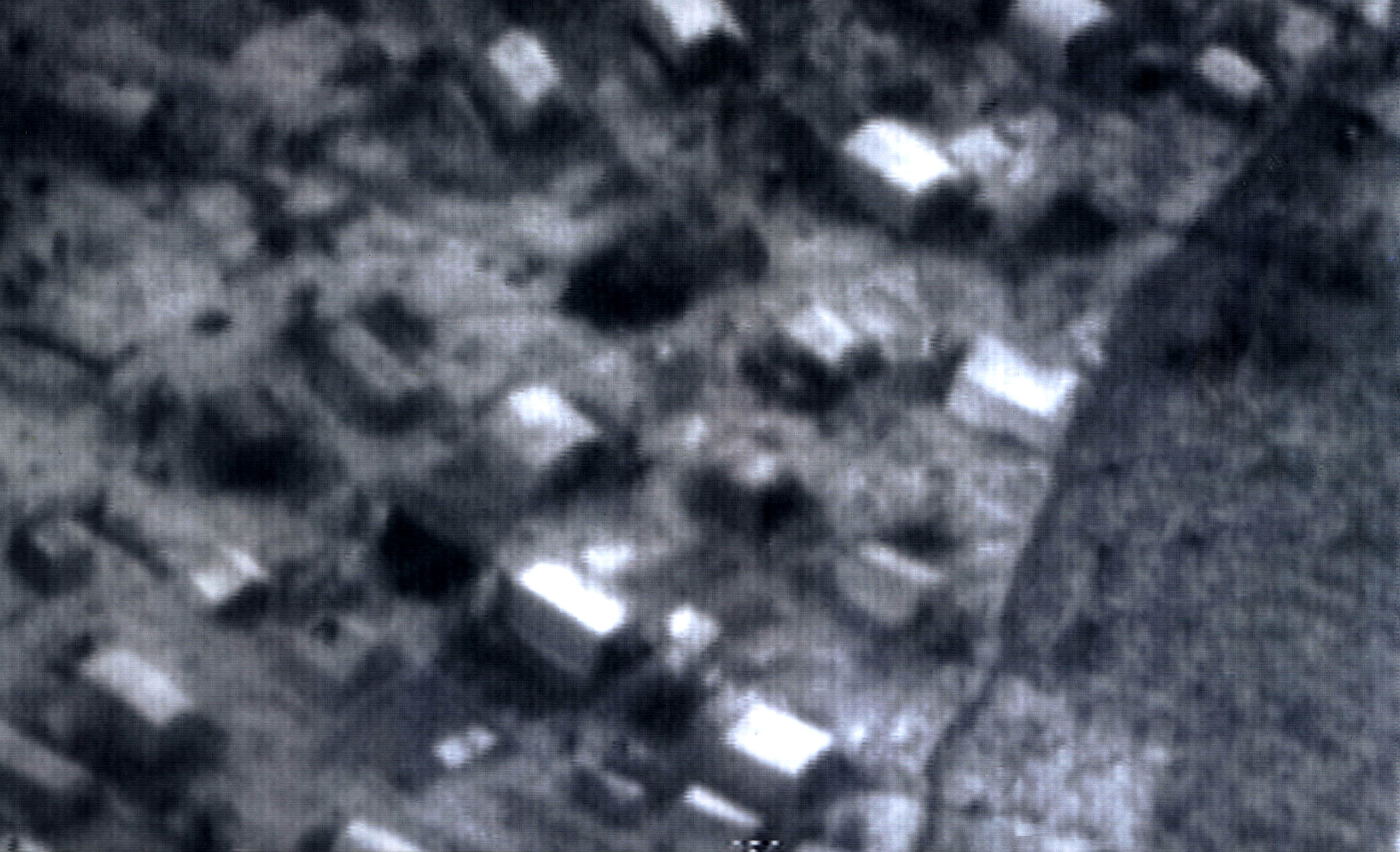
Sake, Zaire refugees in 1996

Confronted with escalating security threats and the intensifying "manhunt" for Tutsis, an armed coalition comprising Banyamulenge insurgents and other factions opposed to the Mobutu regime coalesced into the Alliance of Democratic Forces for the Liberation of Congo-Zaire (AFDL) in 1996. Supported by Rwanda and Uganda and driven by various economic interests, this coalition, under Laurent-Désiré Kabila, instigated the First Congo War, culminating in Kabila's ascension to the presidency in May 1997. This period was characterized by egregious human rights violations, including massacres, rapes, and forced displacements, exacerbated by the massive influx of refugees and internally displaced persons. In January 2022, the civil society of Masisi Territory, led by its president César Bayomba, documented hundreds of cases of women afflicted with fistula between 2018 and 2020, most of which traced back to 1997 during the passage of the AFDL, when women were victims of sexual violence and unassisted childbirth.

In 1998, the Second Congo War erupted when Laurent-Désiré Kabila endeavored to expel his Rwandan allies. This led to the eastern Congo coming under the control of the Congolese Rally for Democracy (RCD), a rebel faction supported by Rwanda and Uganda. During this epoch, Kitchanga evolved into a sanctuary for displaced individuals. The RCD restructured local governance, supplanting traditional leaders with people aligned with their cause. For instance, the Mwami of the Bashali-Mokoto groupement was replaced by Kapenda Muhima, a prominent local Hunde aligned with the RCD. This period witnessed political and military elites, predominantly Rwandophone Congolese, acquiring vast land concessions through semi-legal and often violent means. Kitchanga attained strategic significance in the RCD's "repatriation policy," with numerous Congolese Tutsi "returnees" from Rwanda settling around Kahe in 2002.

==== Ethnic and political maneuvering ====
From late 2000, the RCD-Goma sought to bolster its popular base in North Kivu by appointing Eugène Serufuli Ngayabaseka, a Hutu Banyarwanda, as the provincial governor. Serufuli endeavored to unify Tutsi and Hutu Banyarwanda under the concept of a "Rwandan-speaking" area. To weaken the alliance between the Mayi-Mayi, ex-FAR/Interahamwe, and Hutu armed groups within the FDLR, Serufuli offered the Mayi-Mayi a separate peace and recruited numerous Hutu Banyarwanda into the "Local Defence Forces," allied with the RCD/RPA soldiers. Despite the failure of the FDLR's "Oracle of the Lord" operation against Rwanda in mid-2001 and the commencement of the withdrawal of Rwandan soldiers from the province in September 2002, the RCD-Goma's strategy did not yield the anticipated results. Most Mayi-Mayi groups, encouraged by the Kinshasa government, refused to negotiate with the RCD-Goma and maintained their alliance with the FDLR. Consequently, the RCD-Goma attempted to fragment the Mayi-Mayi groups, offering leadership positions within the RCD-Goma to certain Mayi-Mayi leaders in exchange for their collaboration against FDLR-aligned factions. Throughout this period, civilians remained targets of violence against a backdrop of widespread resource pillaging by various armed groups.

==== Atrocities and human rights violations ====
The violence escalated precipitously, with numerous documented atrocities. In early November 2002, elements of the RCD-Goma massacred an indeterminate number of Hunde during an assault on the village of Bushimoo in the Bashali-Mokoto groupement. On November 3, 2002, Mayi-Mayi forces under a Hunde leader incinerated several Nyanga villages in the Bashali-Mokoto groupement, resulting in numerous casualties. Between January 21 and 23, 2003, RCD-Goma forces executed an unknown number of Hunde civilians in the villages of Bushimoo, Kauli, and Binyungunyungu. During these attacks, they opened fire on civilians, set fire to villages, and committed acts of rape. On February 25, 2003, RCD-Goma elements killed at least 44 people in Bushimoo and Kailenge during a purported community meeting. In April 2003, the RCD-Goma killed five civilians and tortured two women near Walikale, accusing them of collaborating with the Mayi-Mayi. On June 26, 2003, RCD-Goma soldiers used bayonets to kill seven inhabitants of Lukweti, perceived as a Mayi-Mayi stronghold, and systematically pillaged the village.

==== Escalation and entrenchment of conflict ====
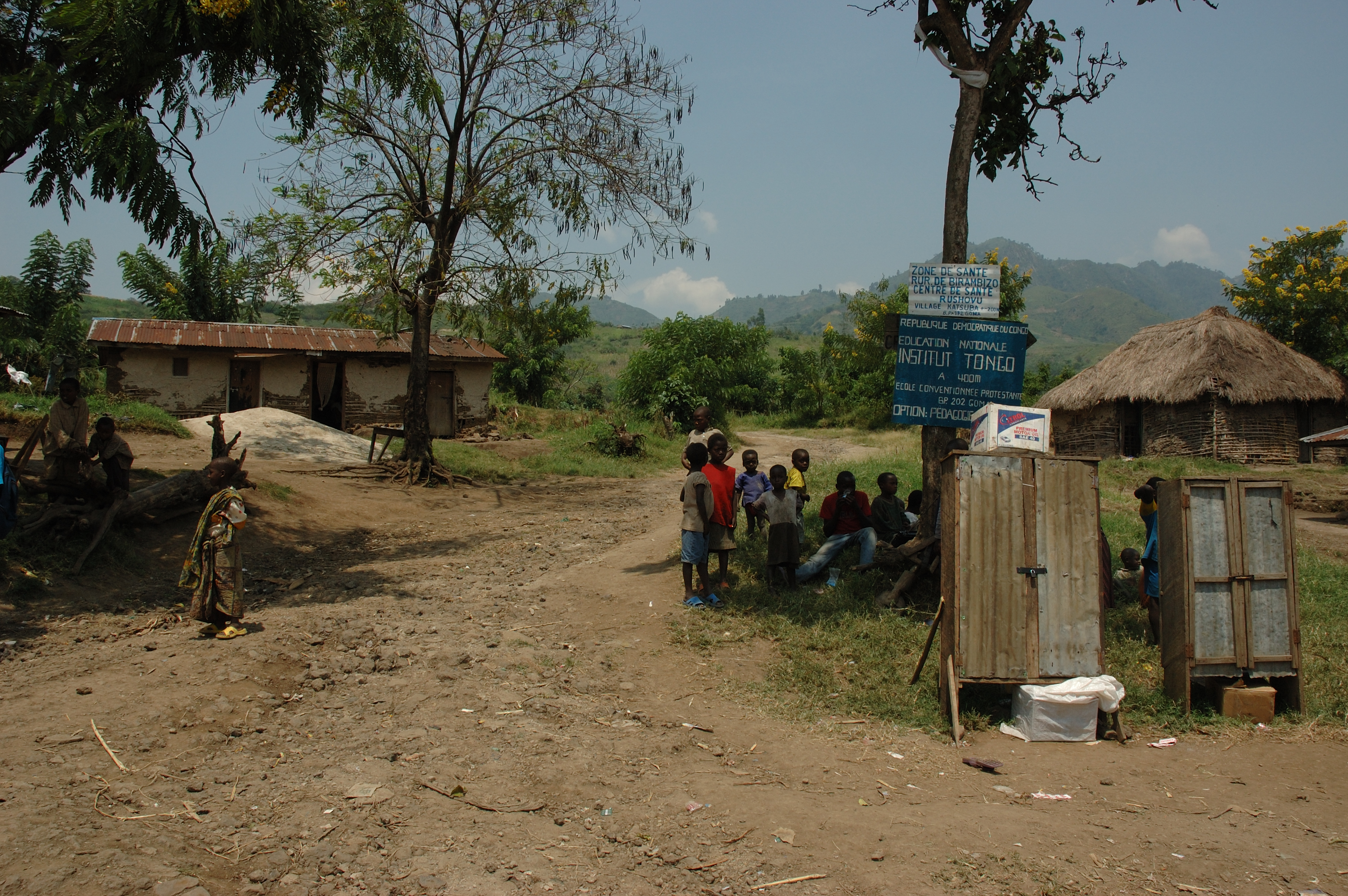
The Tongo groupement in the Bwito Chiefdom became a battleground for Laurent Nkunda's 83rd Brigade and the 9th Brigade of the FARDC.

In 2004, Bashali Chiefdom became a focal point for the Forces Armées de la République Démocratique du Congo (FARDC) 81st, 82nd, and 83rd Brigades, which remained allegiant to Congolese Tutsi military defector Laurent Nkunda, who accused the government of neglecting to integrate his military faction into the national army and failing to safeguard their interests. In February 2006, Nkunda's adherents were reported to be coercing civilians to carry their belongings and subjecting them to corporal punishment for noncompliance. Some were compelled to transport loads into the remote forest area of Bwiza. Local authorities implored the government to restore peace in Kitchanga. In November 2006, Nkunda's soldiers established a strong presence in Kimoka towards Virunga National Park, around thirty kilometers from Goma. Radio Okapi reported that his men came from Kitchanga, Goma, and Mushaki in civilian clothes, donning military uniforms upon arrival in Sake. This sowed widespread outrage and revulsion among the locals who feared Nkunda's presence in Sake. On November 26, the 11th Integrated Brigade of FARDC launched an offensive as part of a so-called cleansing operation (opération de nettoyage) between Sake and Kitchanga against Nkunda's loyalists. Most of these areas remained under the occupation of Nkunda's insurgents. However, the localités of Tongo and Bambu groupements in the Bwito Chiefdom were seized that same day by the 9th Integrated Brigade as part of the same operation. This fighting precipitated a mass exodus, with many families fleeing Bashali Chiefdom towards Goma, and others towards Minova in South Kivu. The United Nations Office for the Coordination of Humanitarian Affairs of North Kivu reported that at least 6,000 displaced families from Nyanzale, Kashuga, Darubandi, Tongo, and Mweshe sought refuge in Kitchanga.

==== The CNDP, APCLS, Mai-Mai Nyatura, CNRD, and NDC-Rénové ====
In December 2006, Nkunda formed the political armed militia Congrès National pour la Défense du Peuple (CNDP). In February 2007, CNDP began imposing multiple taxes on transporters and traders in Sake, Kashebere, and Mushaki. Tensions heightened in May 2007 following the arrest of 14 Rwandans, including CNDP militants, and reports from MONUSCO indicating that Nkunda's forces in North Kivu were wearing various Rwandan military uniforms. In September 2007, the CNDP forcibly recruited children from the Nyakaboya Institute and its surroundings to participate in their warfare. The recruitment spanned Kwasimoni, Muheto, Nyakabowa, and Nyamitaba, causing widespread displacement of civilians from Muheto, Nyamitaba, Kalonge, Kausa, Kitshanga, and Kwasimoni towards Lushebere and Katalé. Pernille Ironside, UNICEF's human rights advocate in eastern DRC, declared that these children were recruited in Ngungu and Kitchanga in Masisi Territory and Nyamilima in Rutshuru Territory.

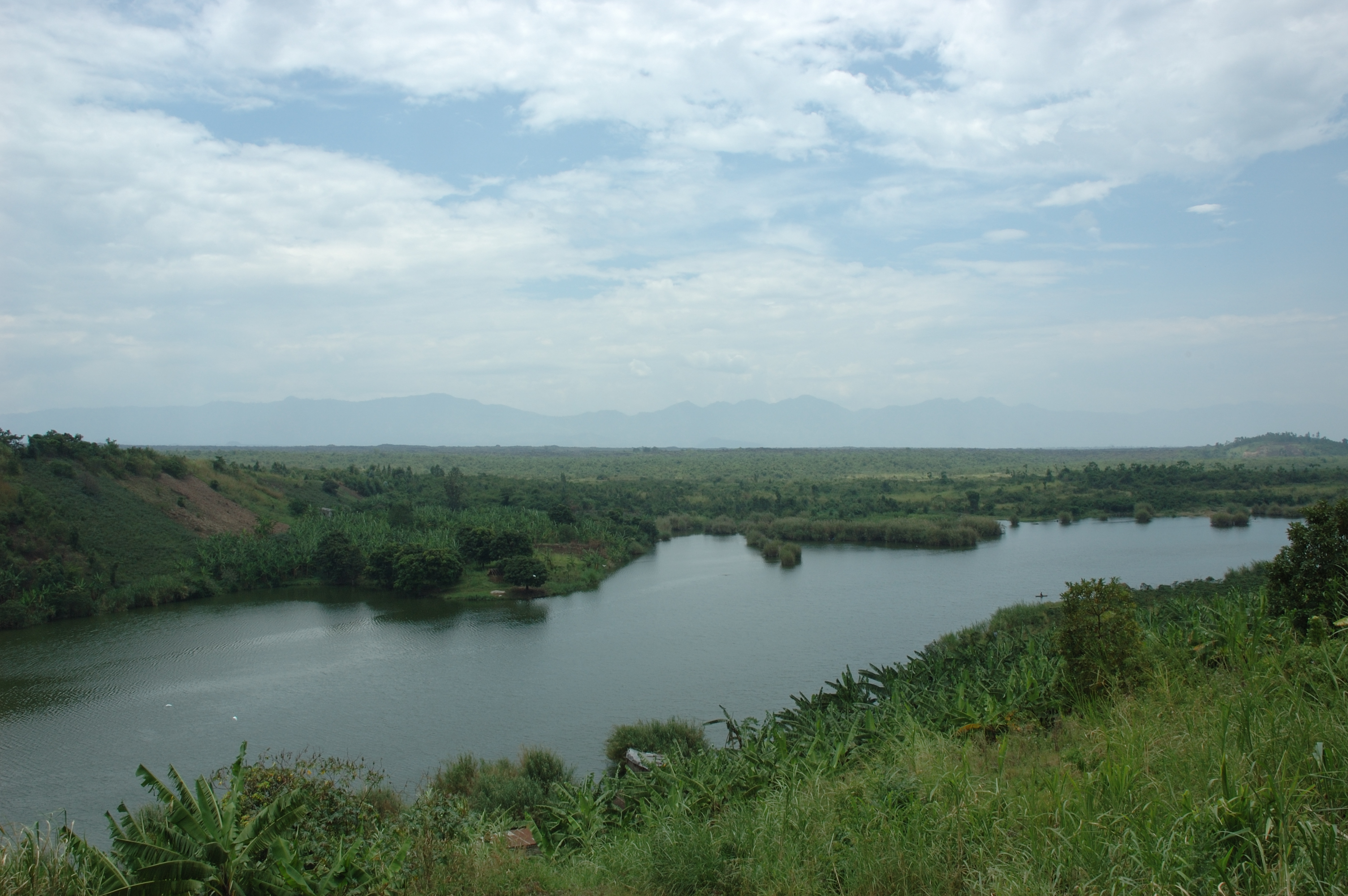
Katale, located near Virunga National Park, March 2007.

In October 2007, a confrontation erupted between FARDC and CNDP in Mushaki around 3 a.m. local time, intensifying around 4 a.m. towards Bihambwe, Matanda, and Katale on the road to Masisi center. Other clashes were reported in Katshiru, Weso, and Buranda, beyond Kitchanga, approximately one hundred kilometers west of Goma. Nkunda declared war through international media and did not provide the 500 men he had promised MONUSCO for integration. MONUSCO dismantled the transit camp established in Mushaki, which was to accommodate CNDP's militias. At least 6,000 families, mainly Congolese Tutsi from Mushaki, fled towards Kirolirwe, approximately 20 kilometers northwest of Goma on the Kitshanga road. Around 10,000 displaced people, primarily Hutus, Hunde, and Tutsis, from Mweso, Kalembe, Nyanzale, and neighboring regions, congregated for nearly a month in a primary school in Kitchanga repurposed as a shelter. Following the three-day combat between FARDC and CNDP, the FARDC reclaimed Mushaki, one of CNDP's strongholds situated 40 kilometers west of Goma, at 6 a.m.

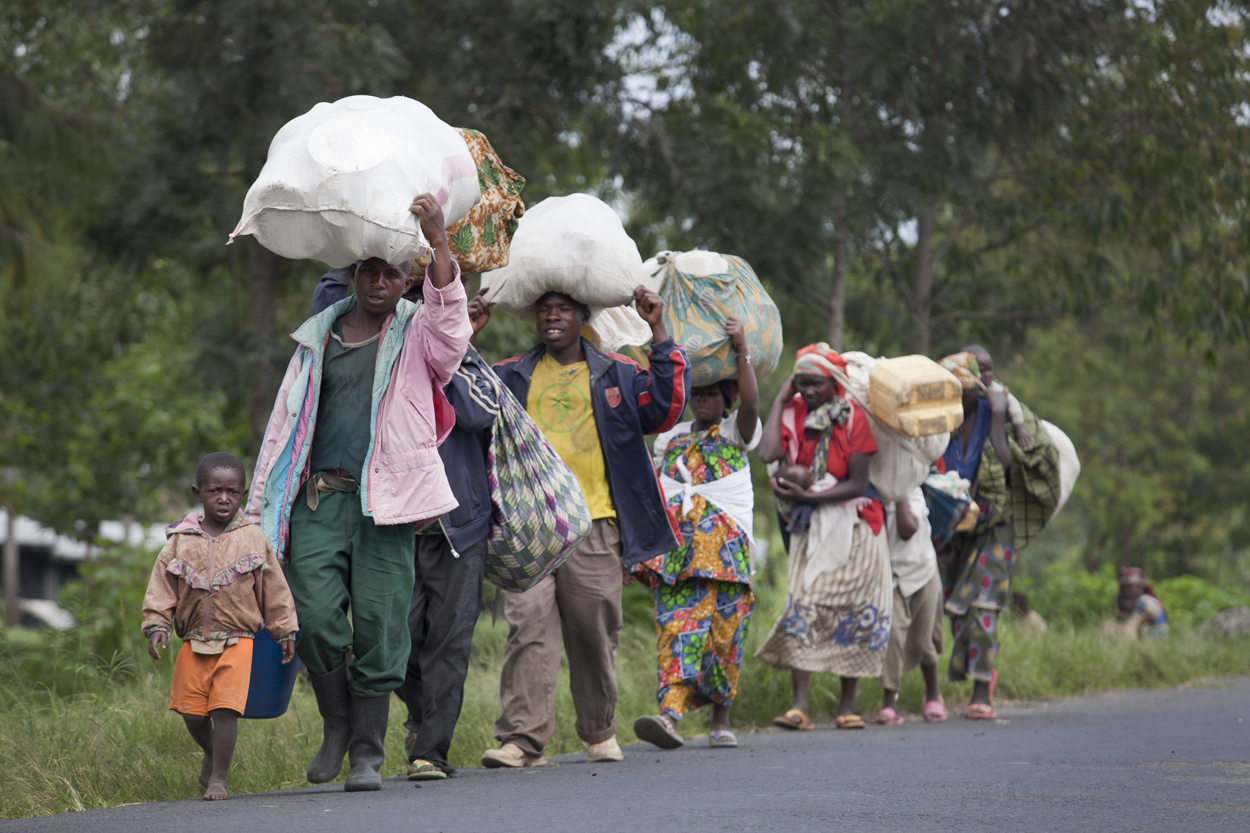
Residents of Sake fleeing their villages due to clashes between FARDC and rebel groups.

On August 26, 2008, the CNDP launched an offensive in Goma, plunging the North Kivu communities into turmoil. Nkunda justified the insurrection as a protective measure for the Congolese Tutsi, thus imbuing the conflict with an ethnic dimension. As with any armed conflict, the war generated numerous casualties and exacerbated divisions among local communities. By 2012, the Bashali Chiefdom had become a bastion for the Alliance des Patriotes pour un Congo Libre et Souverain (APCLS), a group that emerged in the region with the intention of protecting indigenous populations from Tutsi-led rebel factions. In April of that year, the APCLS engaged in combat with FARDC in the Bushenge sector, situated between Mweso and Kashuga, over 100 km northwest of Goma, with the objective of seizing control of Mweso. The APCLS incinerated the FARDC position in Mbuhi, resulting in the mass displacement of hundreds of households from Kashuga, Katshiru, and Kalembe, who sought refuge in Mweso and Kitchanga. Administrative officials subsequently entreated military authorities to deploy soldiers to safeguard the displaced populace. That same month, the NGO Heal Africa reported 112 instances of sexual violence in March 2012, with numerous victims being minor girls, attributing the insecurity to the presence of armed groups and numerous displaced persons' camps. Later in April 2012, Bosco Ntaganda, chief of staff of the CNDP, established headquarters in Kingi and Kibati, on the road to Kitchanga, and commandeered several localities in the Masisi Territory, including Karuba located 37 km northwest of Goma on the road to Mushaki. Ntaganda's forces prevented inhabitants of Karuba from leaving their homes, and other localities, including Muheto, Mushaki, Buku, Kitchanga, Bwiza, Nyamitaba, Kirolirwe, Kabati, Mukambi, Murambi, Misumbala, Luhunga, and Mweso, were also under their control. Inhabitants vacated the premises, seeking refuge in Mubambiro, 2 km from Saké, and others settled in Goma or crossed the Congolese border to find asylum in Gisenyi, Rwanda. However, the governor of North Kivu, Julien Paluku Kahongya, refuted claims that certain localities had fallen to insurgents, asserting they remained under government control despite loyalty to Bosco Ntaganda. On April 30, FARDC initiated a counter-offensive against CNDP, reclaiming several localities in Masisi and Rutshuru territories, including Bwiza near Kitchanga, approximately 100 km west of Goma, and villages such as Kautu, Kabaya, and Karuba near Mushaki. By May 2, FARDC recaptured Kitchanga and Mushaki.

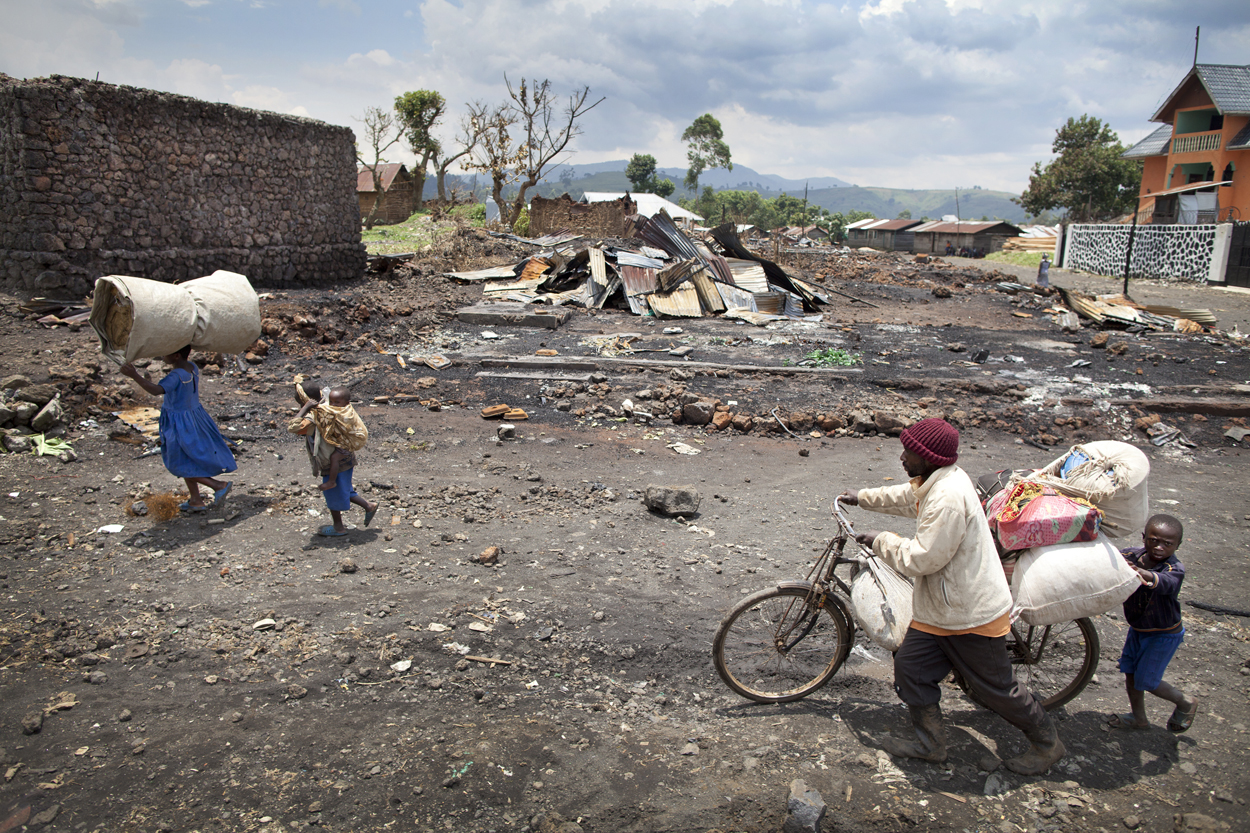
Displaced persons return to Kitchanga following intense clashes between the APCLS militia and the FARDC, March 2013.

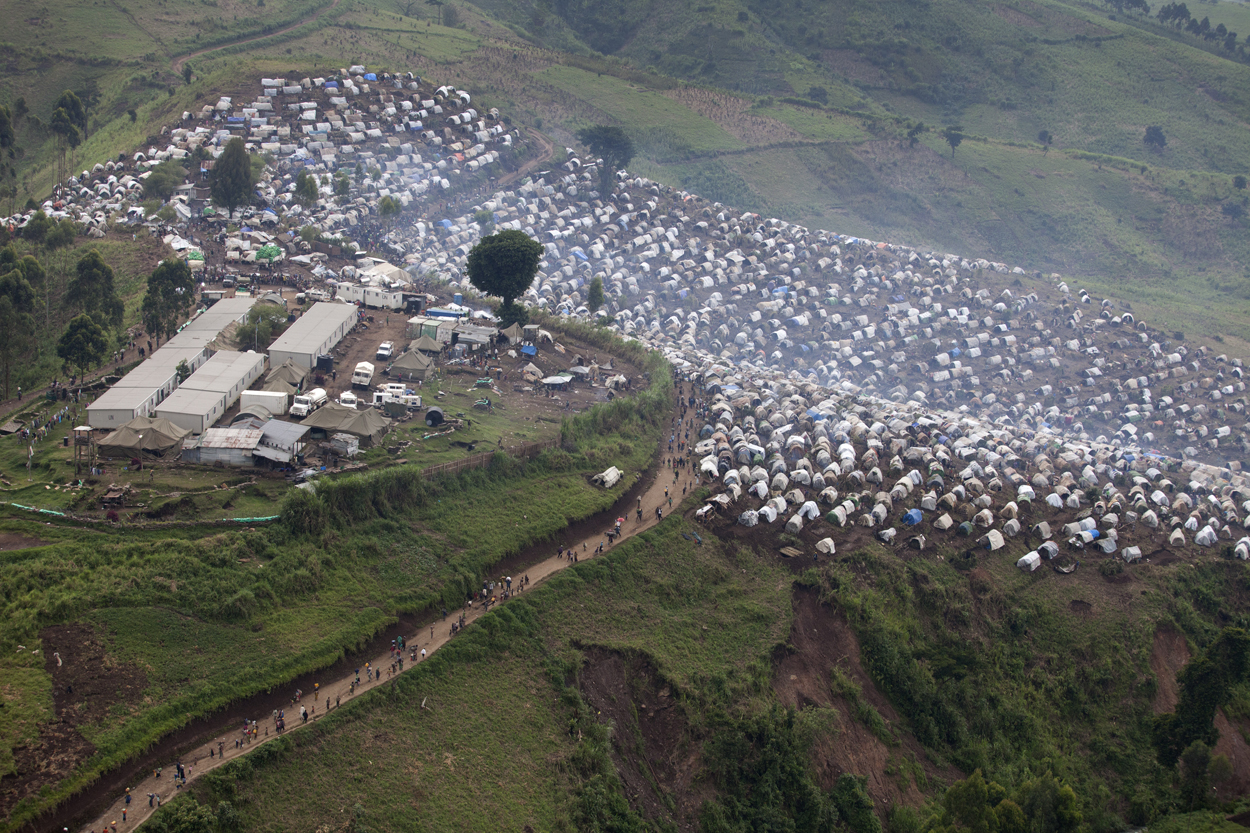
IDP camps surrounding the MONUSCO base in Kitchanga after heavy fighting erupted between the APCLS and FARDC, displacing an estimated 5,000 people and resulting in at least 90 deaths, March 7, 2013.

In May 2012, the M23 rebel military group seized significant portions of North Kivu, with Rwanda allegedly providing arms, ammunition, medical support, recruitment, and free passage for troops and politicians. The Rwandan army reportedly participated in key attacks, including the M23 assaults on Bunagana and Rutshuru. There were indications that the Ugandan government also provided support to M23, most notably during the second battle for Rutshuru on July 24–25. By January 2013, approximately 54,400 IDPs were residing in the Mweso health zone of the Bashali-Mokoto groupement, deprived of humanitarian assistance for nearly five months and subjected to various forms of harassment by M23 and other local militias. From February to March 2013, clashes between FARDC and APCLS in Kitchanga resulted in 80 fatalities, numerous injuries, and the displacement of nearly 100,000 people. The APCLS accused the government of failing to integrate its fighters into the national army to perpetuate threats from Tutsi rebel factions allegedly supported by Rwanda. The International Committee of the Red Cross (ICRC) issued a plea to halt violence against Kitchanga's civilian population. Ban Ki-moon, then UN Secretary-General, urged the UN Security Council to sanction an international intervention brigade. On March 29, 2013, skirmishes between APCLS and FARDC in Kitobo and Muhanga resulted in the deaths of 17 APCLS militiamen and one FARDC officer, with FARDC forces subsequently expelling the militants from the outskirts of Kitchanga.

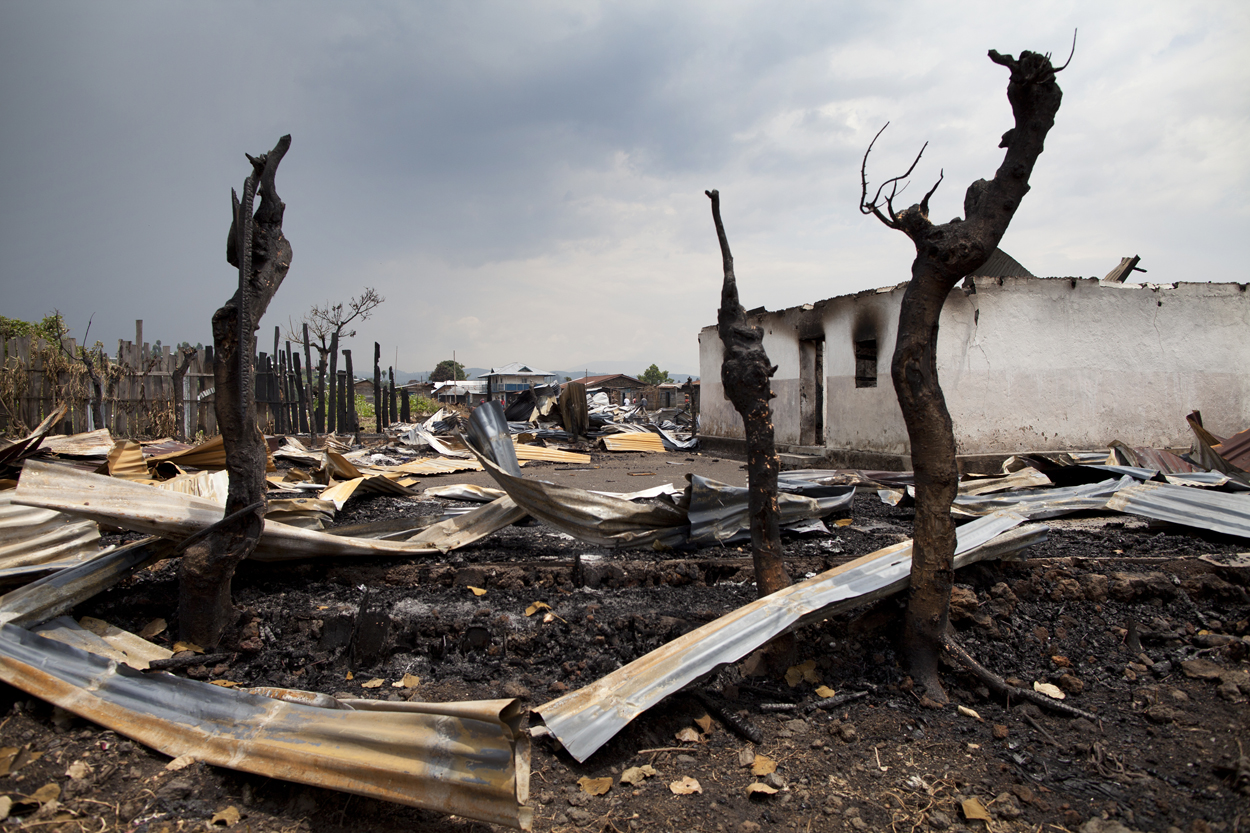
The ruins of Heal Africa medical center in Kitchanga after five days of intense fighting between the APCLS militia and FARDC.

On April 22, Mai-Mai Nyatura militiamen reportedly killed six people during an armed attack in Rutshuru-center. They also slaughtered five cows on a farm adjacent to the Mwami Ndeze stadium before retreating into the bush along the Katemba-Tongo axis. However, locals and the Forces pour la Défense des Intérêts du Peuple Congolais (FDIPC) attributed these attacks to the M23 rebels, claiming it was retribution against the indigenous populations in anticipation of the MONUSCO intervention brigade's arrival. On May 12, the detonation of an antipersonnel mine in Kitchanga resulted in one fatality and eight injuries, with the device being among the explosive remnants from recent clashes between APCLS militia and FARDC. On May 17, 2013, Mai-Mai Nyatura militiamen ousted the Congolese National Police (PNC) from several localities within Kitchanga. A police chief conceded that the force was unprepared for armed confrontation. In response, civil society appealed for FARDC intervention to expel the militias. On May 18, 2013, FARDC dislodged the militias from the Mbuyi and Kashanje hills towards Mweso and expelled Mai-Mai Nyatura from Muhongozi, near Kitchanga. On December 9, the MONUSCO Intervention Brigade launched military operations against the FDLR rebels in the Kitshanga-Kalembe and Pinga areas as part of a comprehensive plan against local and foreign armed groups in the region. On December 29, armed bandits killed a police officer and burglarized seven houses in Kitchanga. The resurgence of APCLS and Mai-Mai Nyatura militias in October 2013 caused widespread displacement, with IDPs congregating in Kitchanga.

On January 29, 2014, "unidentified armed bandits" killed four people in Kitchanga, including the national police chief, a farmer, and a teacher. In response, on February 9, FARDC launched an offensive against APCLS and Mai-Mai Nyatura in Kibarizo, Muhanga, and Butare, approximately twenty kilometers west of Kitchanga. By the afternoon, FARDC dislodged APCLS from Kibarizo, Muhanga, and Butare.

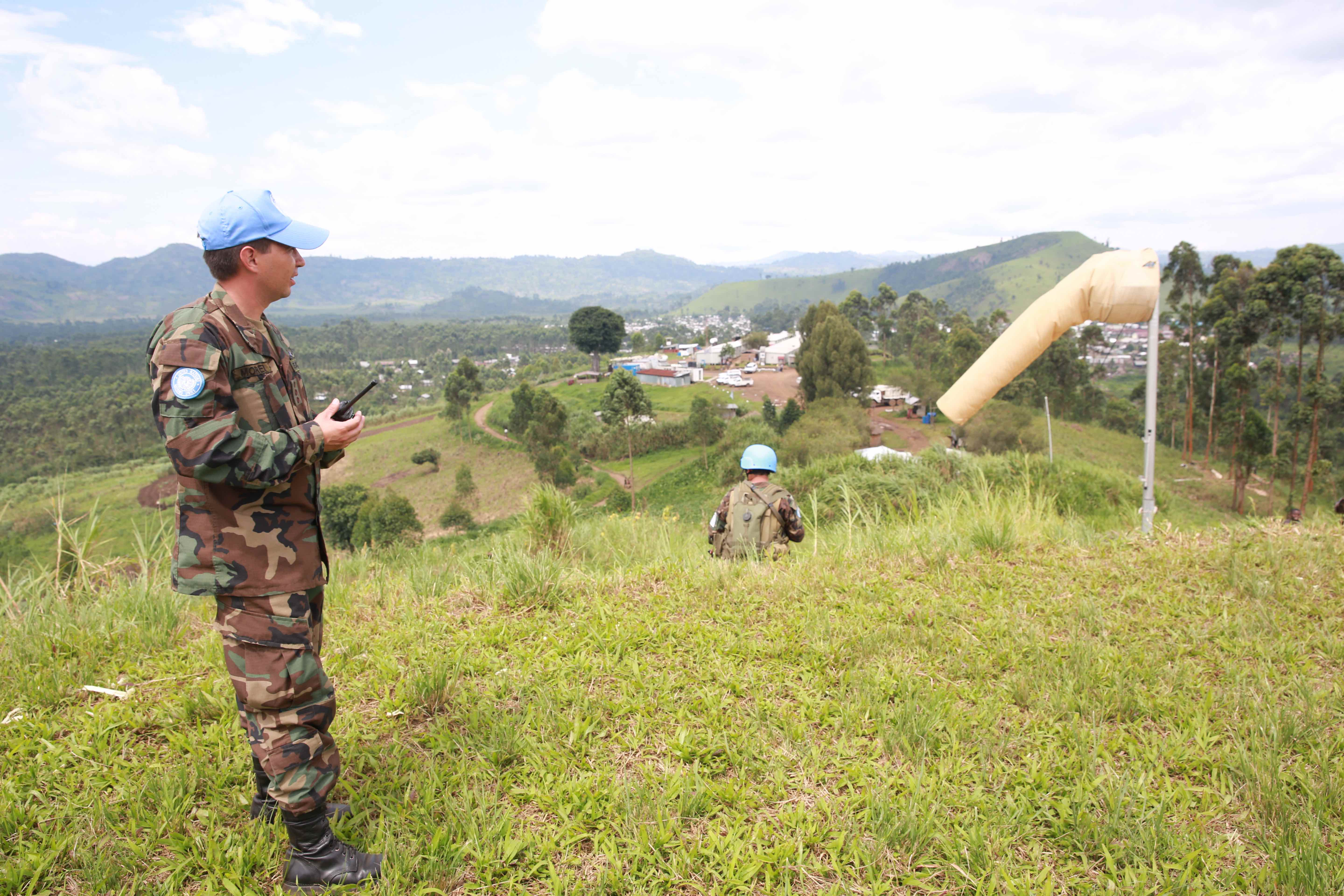
UN peacekeepers standing guard on the helipad of the MONUSCO base in Kitchanga.

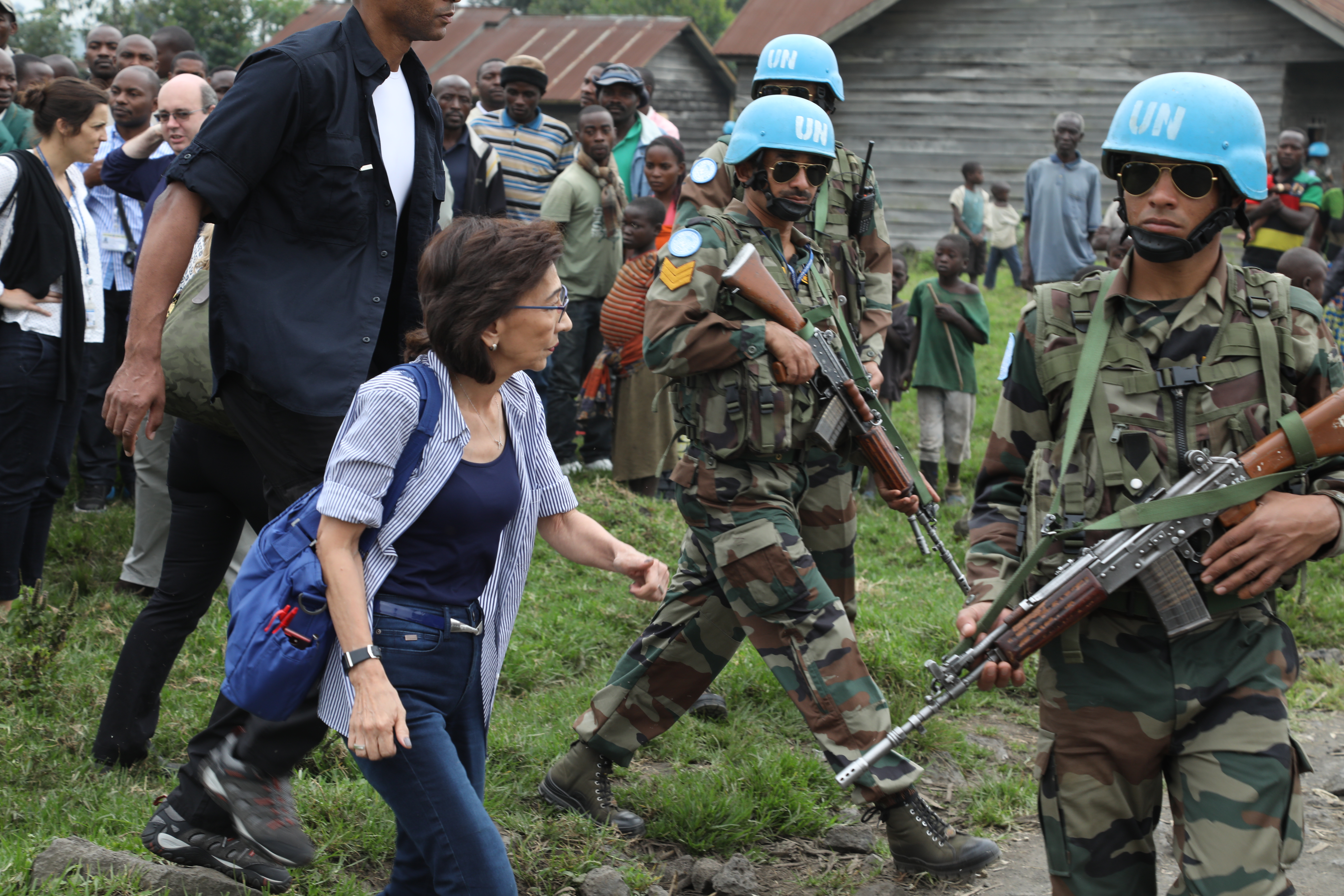
Special Representative of the Secretary-General, Kim Bolduc, visits Kitchanga.

In January 2015, cows became targets of armed groups in Kitchanga, with nearly 70 animals slaughtered in the same month. These livestock massacres were linked to the conflict between farmers and herders over land disputes. On March 25, FARDC regained control of Lukweti in the Bashali-Mokoto groupement, previously occupied by APCLS for several years. The FARDC's 802nd regiment from Kitchanga then launched an offensive against APCLS positions in Lukweti. On February 7, 2016, three people were shot dead by armed men in FARDC uniforms while watching the DRC-Mali final match of the 2016 African Nations Championship in Burungu. On May 6, an NGO Heal Africa agent died from bullet wounds while fleeing fighting between APCLS and FARDC on the road between Mweso and Kitchanga. Populations from the Bashali-Mokoto groupement in several localities, including Kahira, Kirumbu, Mpati, Muhanga, and Busumba, fled to Mweso and Muhongozi, fearing for their safety after FARDC's withdrawal from Kitchanga. The local chiefs of Bashali-Mokoto petitioned military officials for the redeployment of troops to facilitate the return of populations long affected by insecurity imposed by the Mai-Mai Nyatura and their FDLR allies.

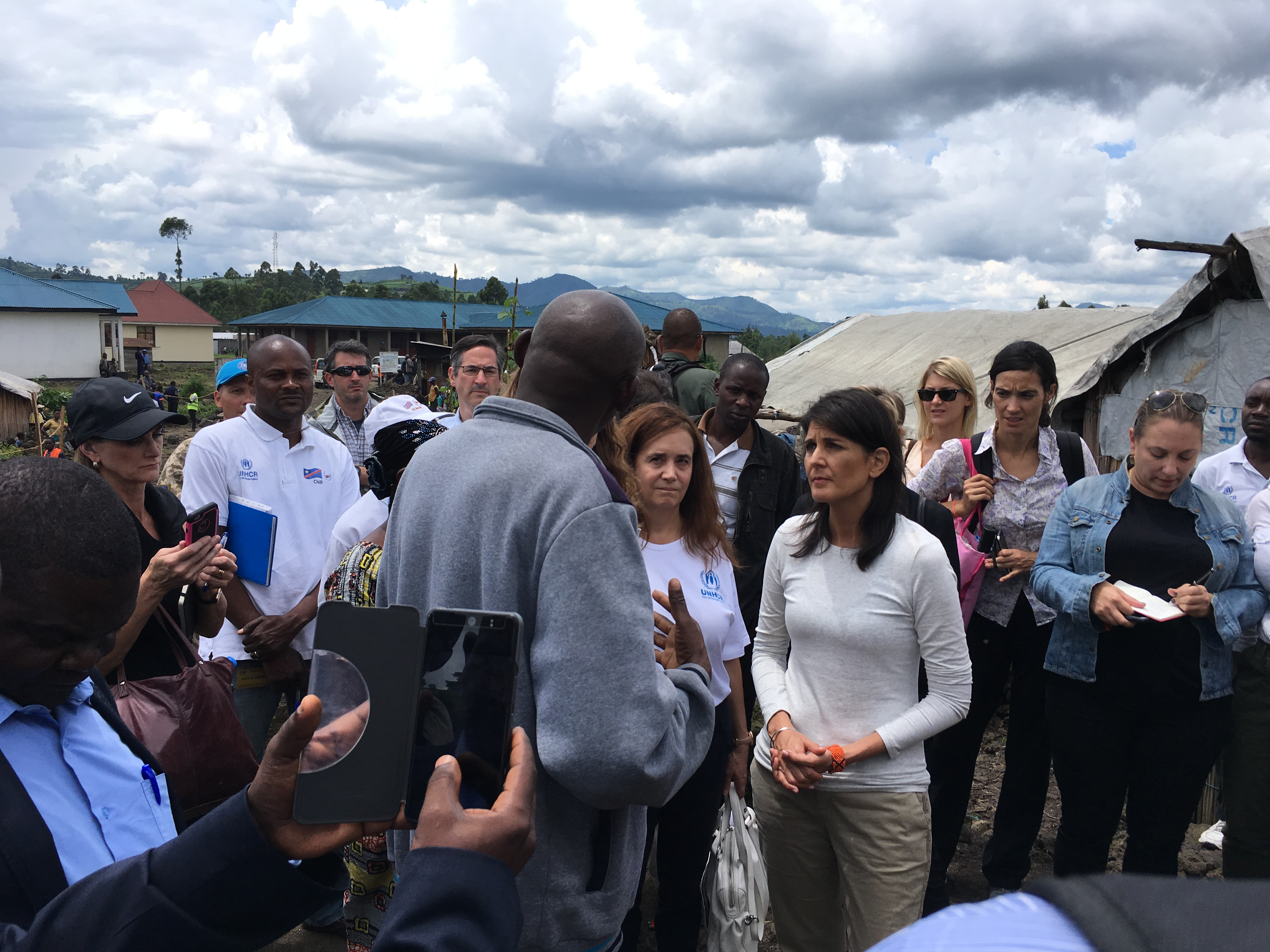
U.S. Ambassador to the United Nations, Nikki Haley, visits an internally displaced persons site in Mungote.

On August 23, 2016, a peace accord was brokered between the APCLS and Mai-Mai Nyatura militias in Muhanga, facilitated by local officials and security services, pledging to foster peace and development in the Bashali-Mokoto groupement. The militias returned 24 weapons to the Masisi Territory authorities on September 8. However, conflict between FARDC and APCLS resumed on October 20, 2017, with clashes on Kitobo hill near Kitchanga. On May 26, 2018, four people were kidnapped in Kitchanga by an unidentified armed group, later identified as Mai-Mai Nyatura. In retaliation for the kidnapping, a mother of a suspected Mai-Mai Nyatura fighter was killed by alleged APCLS fighters of Hunde persuasion. On June 2, three people died during an armed incursion in Kitchanga, with local sources accusing the APCLS of the killings. On December 30, clashes between Nduma défense du Congo-Rénové (NDC-Rénové) and FDLR and Conseil National pour le Renouveau et la Démocratie (CNRD) forces in Bashali-Mokoto led to the displacement of the CNRD, followed by Mai-Mai Nyatura's attempt to occupy vacated villages, resulting in further conflict with NDC-Rénové.

On January 20, 2019, ten people were killed, and several injured during clashes between NDC-Rénové and Mai-Mai Nyatura in Kitchanga. Sixteen people were killed on January 29 in clashes among various armed groups in Bashali-Mokoto. On February 21, fighting on Katoko hill between NDC-Rénové and a coalition of Mai-Mai Nyatura and APCLS fighters left at least eleven dead and eight seriously injured, with two children missing and several captured. A PNC report from March 28 indicated that 57 women were raped between January 1 and March 28 by fighters from NDC-Rénové, Nyatura de Kavumbi, and Bohoza from the Apollo group, with local sources reporting over 300 people killed in the Bashali-Mokoto groupement during the same period, including more than 100 civilians.

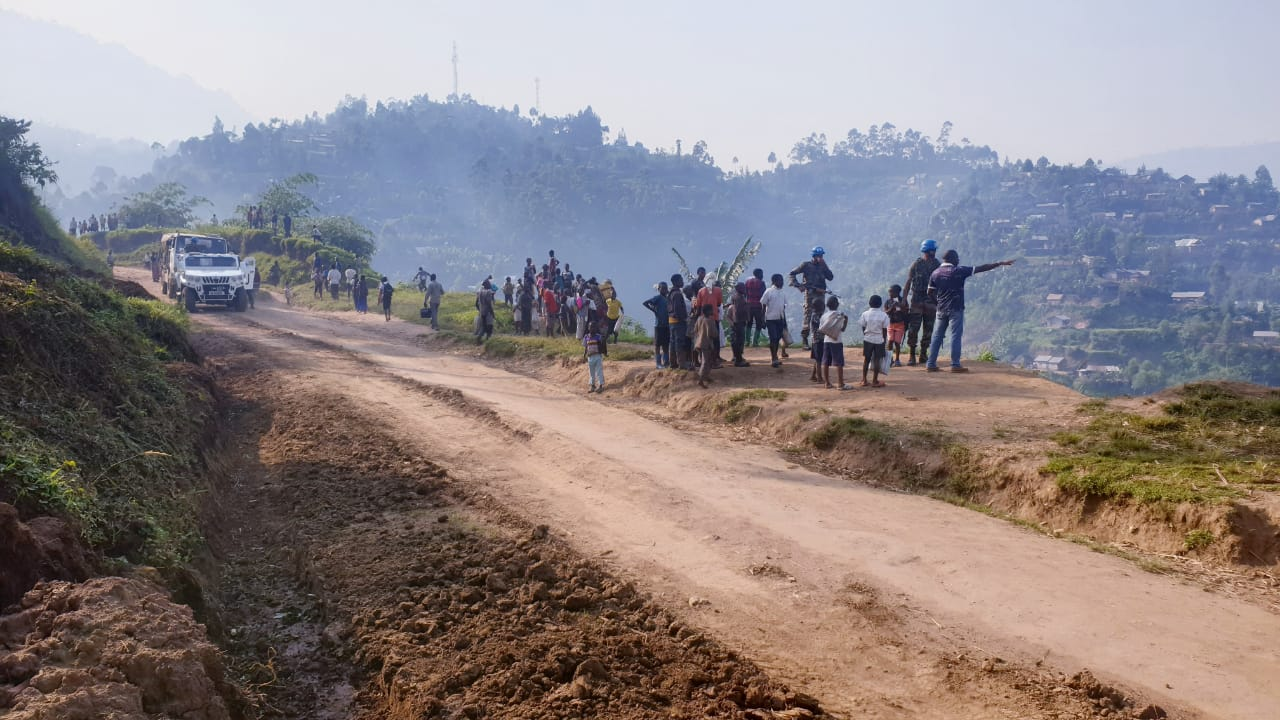
MONUSCO peacekeepers in Masisi engage with local community members to foster collaboration and build trust.

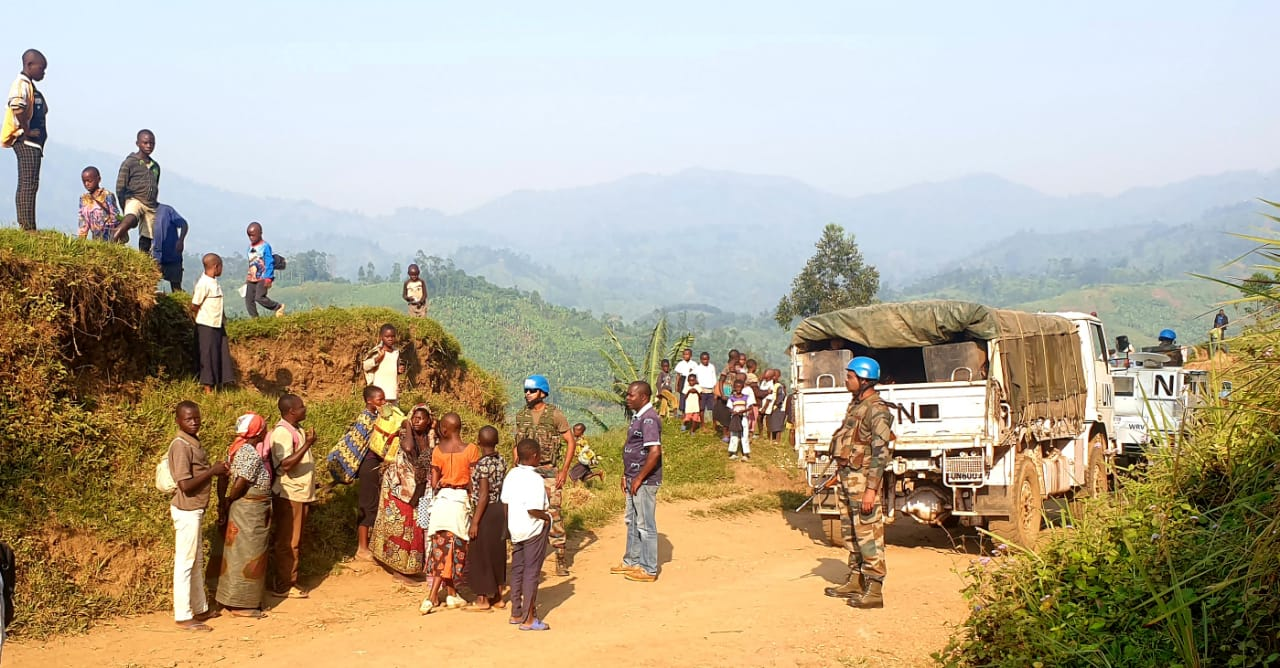
MONUSCO protected hundreds of civilians trapped in crossfire, escorting them to safety.

In July 2019, MONUSCO and STAREC, a government program designed for regions affected by armed conflicts, facilitated peaceful cohabitation and social dialogue in Pinga between the Hunde and Nyanga communities to disassociate themselves from armed groups. The administrators of the Walikale and Masisi territories moderated the meeting, accompanied by the head of the Wanianga sector and his counterpart from Bashali Chiefdom. However, within two months, two women were killed in the Mungote displaced persons camp. That same month, Radio Okapi reported that six people had been killed and six others injured. Bashali Chiefdom authorities petitioned for the closure of the Mungote displaced persons camp, which they believed was the epicenter of escalating insecurity in Kitchanga. On October 9, approximately 1,100 displaced households from Lumbasha, Lushebere, Kanyangahe, and Masha in the Bukombo groupement of Bwito Chiefdom were registered in Mweso and 800 in Muhongozi. On December 16, three people were killed in Kitchanga. In May 2021, three civilians were fatally shot within two days, with one of the victims killed by militiamen in Lukweti, while another succumbed to injuries inflicted by armed men in Karunda at Masisi-center hospital. A police officer was also shot, and his weapon confiscated by unknown assailants in Kitchanga. On July 14, at least 70 fighters from the armed group Alliance des Nationalistes Congolais pour la Défense des droits Humains (ANCDH), known as Nyatura Abazungu, surrendered to FARDC in a ceremony officiated by the provincial governor, Lieutenant General Constant Ndima Kongba in Kitchanga, relinquishing 65 weapons, including numerous AK-47s.

==== M23 conflict (2022–present) ====
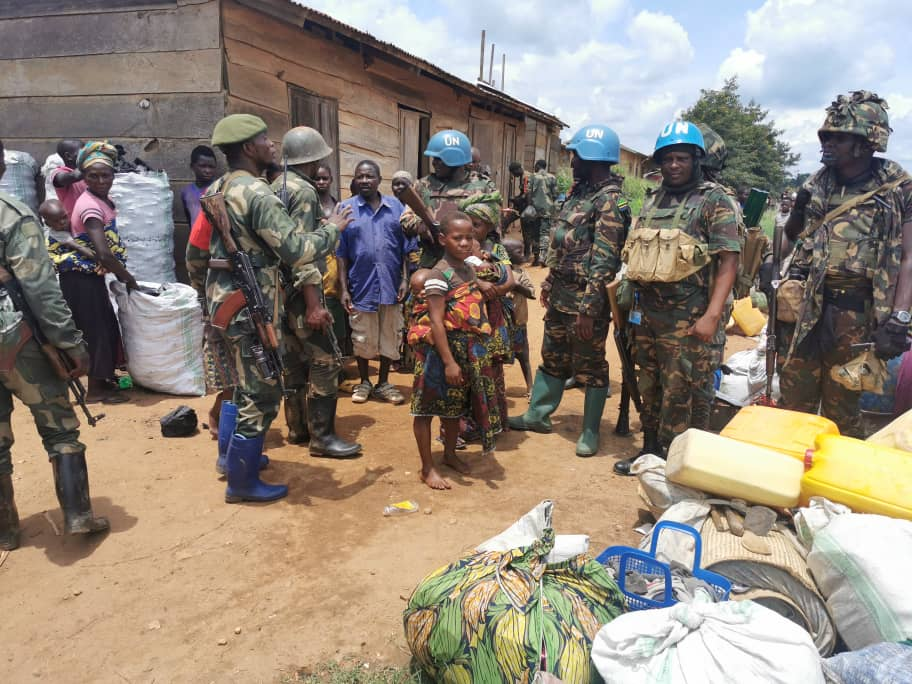
Joint operations by MONUSCO and FARDC restored safety to the region, allowing villagers from Maberenga to return to their homes.

On May 12, 2022, Congolese President Félix Tshisekedi declared his opposition to any alliance between Congolese military commanders and armed groups, particularly the M23. Mediation efforts led by Angola under the African Union between Presidents Félix Tshisekedi and Paul Kagame made little headway. The African Union and its member states explicitly warned Rwanda that its continued military support for M23 could implicate it in M23's abuses as a matter of state responsibility, with Rwandan officials potentially being held complicit in M23 war crimes. On November 14, M23 blockaded the Nyanzale–Katsiru road section, impeding over fifty vehicles. On November 17, FARDC engaged in clashes with M23 rebels in the Kibumba and Buhumba groupements of Bukumu Chiefdom in Nyiragongo Territory. Concurrently, battles also occurred on the Tongo axis, with M23 attempting to advance towards Kitchanga via the Bishusha groupement of Bwito Chiefdom. This escalation forced inhabitants of Bishusha, Birambizo, and Bukombo groupements in Bwito Chiefdom to flee towards Kitchanga. Five civilians, including a woman, were injured by shell shrapnel on the outskirts of Tongo. FARDC thwarted M23's attempts to advance towards Kilimanyoka and Kibati, subsequently pushing them back to the vicinity of the Ruhunda market – 3 branches in Kibumba.

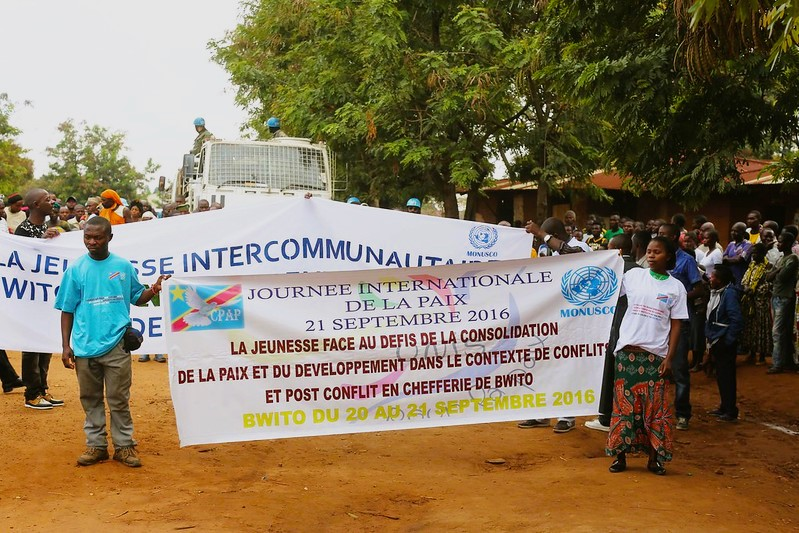
Civilians marching in Kibirizi village, Mutanda groupement, Bwito Chiefdom, September 2016.

Between 21–30 November 2022, M23 perpetrated a massacre, resulting in 171 deaths in Bwito Chiefdom across Bambo, Tongo, and Bishusha groupements according to UNJHRO and MONUSCO preliminary investigations. However, Kinshasa authorities reported a more alarming death toll of approximately 300. The attack caused the displacement of hundreds of thousands, forcing them to flee to nearby locations such as Kanyabayonga, Kibirizi, Kashala, Kirima, Nyanzale, Kashalira, Bambu, and Kitchanga. On December 15, U.S. Secretary of State Antony Blinken urged Rwanda to "use its influence with M23 to encourage" them to withdraw and to "pull back" its own forces. Belgium, France, Germany, and the European Union also implored Rwanda to cease assisting M23. On January 26, 2023, M23 rebels seized Kitchanga, prompting civilians from other communities to flee in fear of retaliation. On January 27, at 9 a.m., M23 rebels initiated heavy weapon fire in Karton, about 5 kilometers north of Kitchanga, aiming to advance towards Mweso, from where FARDC had withdrawn. The rebels established two forward positions on the hills around the MONUSCO base, one at Rusinga north of Kitchanga, and another on Kitobo hill, 2 kilometers southwest of Kitchanga, towards Kibarizo. Hundreds of displaced people flocked to the former Bulengo site in the Lac Vert district, which had hosted numerous displaced households during the CNDP era in 2007 and 2008. However, Radio Okapi reported that the site was undeveloped, lacking latrines and potable water. Subsequently, three local radio stations broadcasting in Bashali Chiefdom, namely Radio Communautaire de Mweso (RCM), Radio Communautaire pour la Paix des Bashali (RCPB), and Radio CORAKI FM of Kitchanga, were compelled to cease operations due to threats from M23 rebels. Fighting between M23 rebels and FARDC on February 1 resulted in the displacement of over 450,000 people. More than 500 people sought refuge at MONUSCO's base in Kitchanga. On February 4, RCPB, broadcasting from Kitchanga, was systematically looted, with M23 rebels absconding with eight batteries, ten solar panels, one converter, one generator, three computers, two printers, and approximately ten chairs. On February 6, M23 and their allies convened a meeting, urging Kitchanga's population to return to their residences with promises of security. However, residents refused to return, petitioning instead for assistance from the Congolese government. Educational activities in primary and secondary schools under M23 and its allies' occupation were suspended.

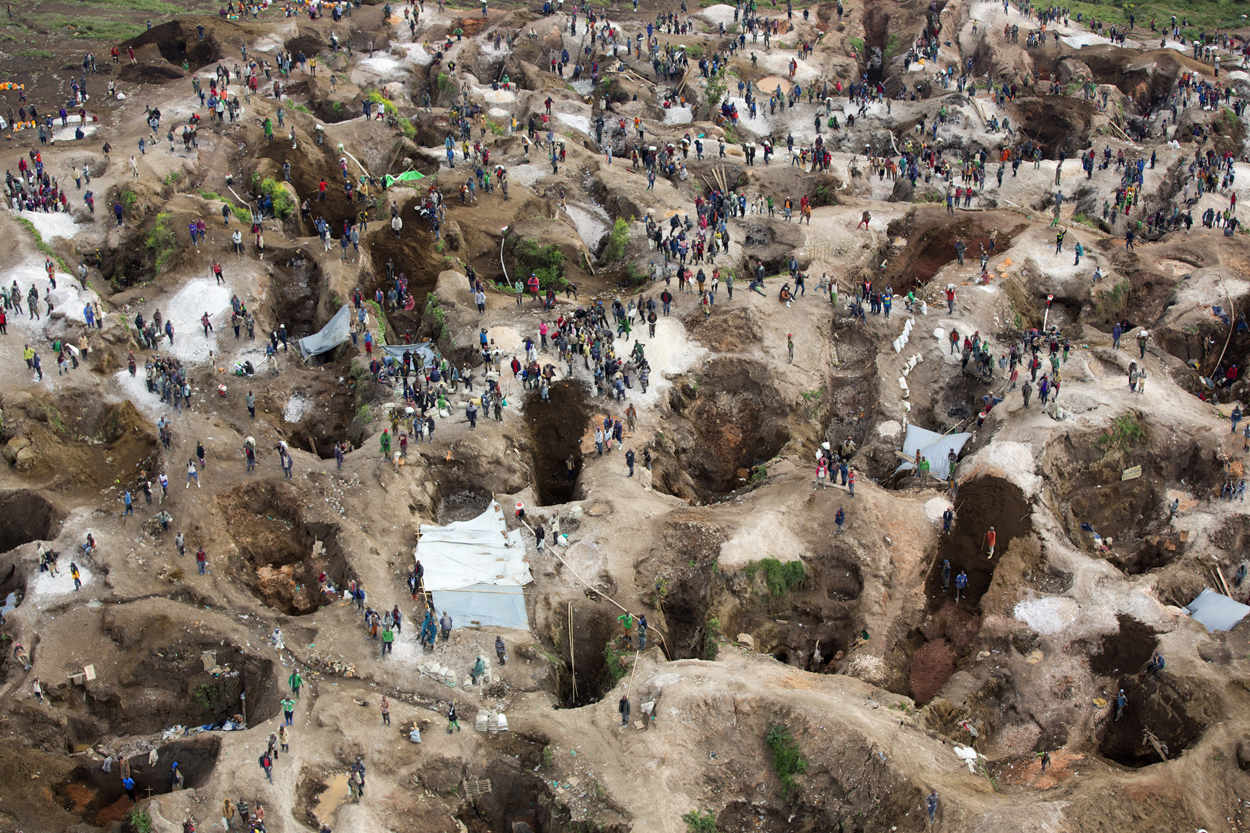
The Luwowo coltan mine near Rubaya on March 18, 2014.

On February 9, the East African Community (EAC), during a meeting in Nairobi, brokered an immediate ceasefire by all parties and the withdrawal of all local and foreign armed groups. The EAC set February 28 as the deadline for M23 to withdraw from occupied areas. The EAC delineated the redeployment of its regional forces within the eastern DRC, with the Burundi National Defence Force (FDNB) assigned to Sake, Kirolirwe, and Kitchanga, while the Kenya Defence Forces (KDF) were designated to Kibumba, Rumangabo, Tongo, and Kishishe. South Sudanese forces were to be positioned in Rumangabo alongside the Kenyan contingent, whereas Ugandan forces were assigned to Bunagana, Kiwanja, Rutshuru, and the Mabenga region. Despite the EAC's directives, M23 rebels and the Rwandan army reportedly continued to occupy new regions, including Mushaki, Busumba, Rubaya, Bihambwe, Mweso, and Sake. Later, FARDC, supported by Mai-Mai Nyatura, expelled M23 rebels from Luhonga and Malehe near Sake, as well as from Rubaya.

On March 11, M23 announced their withdrawal from occupied regions to allow Burundian troops from the EAC to be deployed there. On March 13, the leader of the Groupe de Thématique Mines et Hydrocarbures de la Société Civile, Alexis Muhima, told Radio Okapi that M23 was occupying areas with numerous mining sites. The Mushaki-Karuba and Kitchanga axes, which M23 occupied, are main evacuation routes for minerals. On the same day, M23 rebels withdrew from Mweso around midnight, taking with them patients from the Hôpital Général de Référence de Mweso and some members of the civilian communities devoted to their cause. They advanced to Kitchanga, while other elements positioned themselves in Muongozi, Busumba, and Kirumbu around Mweso. By March 14, M23 had withdrawn from certain hills around Sake, including Ngingwe, Neenero, and Malehe. However, the M23 rebels remained in Kitchanga, Kirolirwe, Karuba, and Mushaki. On March 29, M23 systematically looted the population's property, particularly livestock, before retreating to the hills of Gasiza, located 3 kilometers from Bihambwe on the Matanda groupement of Bahunde Chiefdom.

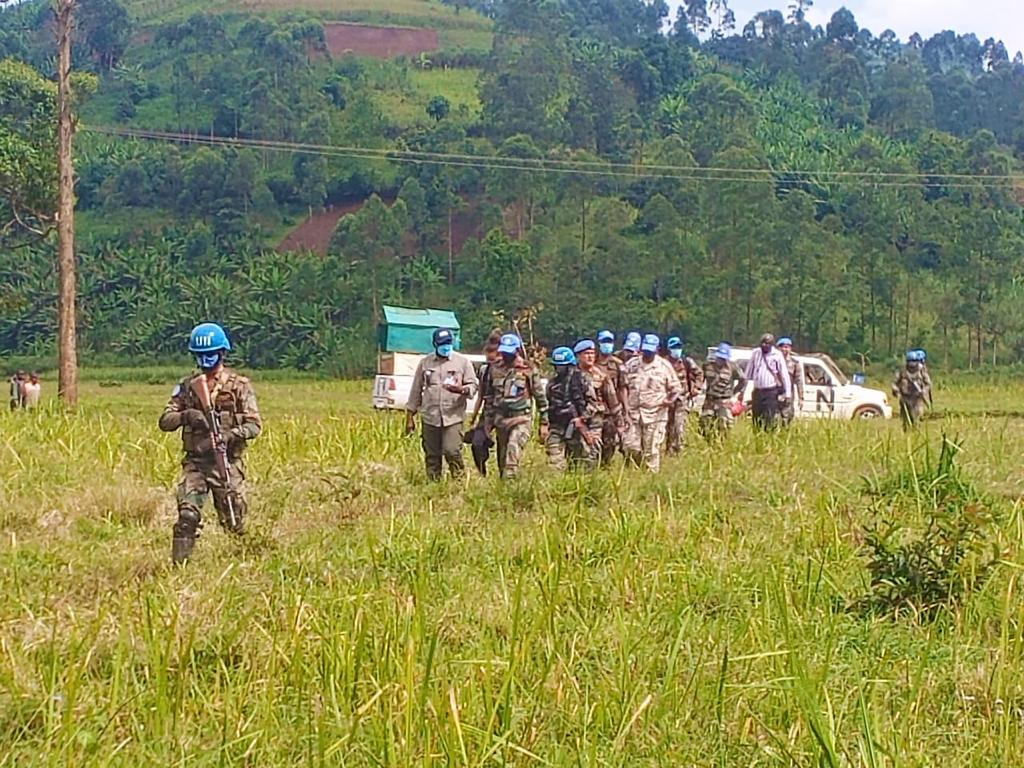
The MONUSCO Force Central Sector Commander and the Chief of the Goma office visited the MONUSCO patrol in North Kivu near Gigero, Mweso, or Miriki to assess the challenges in protecting civilians.

On March 30, Radio Okapi reported that the Kenyan contingent, which was supposed to deploy its troops, had not arrived in the planned regions, which remained under M23 control. The Burundian soldiers were not implemented because M23 rebels still occupied Kitchanga to Mweso and expanded their area of control. The South Sudanese contingent also had not arrived in the region. However, Bunagana, central Rutshuru, Kiwanja, and Mabenga remained occupied by M23 while the Ugandan soldiers who were supposed to be deployed in this region were positioned at the DRC-Ugandan border. The chiefs of staff of the EAC member countries decided that the cantonment and disarmament of M23 rebels on Congolese territory should be overseen by Congolese authorities, the ad hoc verification mechanism, MONUSCO, and regional forces. On April 2, the withdrawal of M23 rebels from their deployment areas sparked controversy. KDF troops deployed in Rumangabo while the rebels were still present, and Ugandan troops, whose authorities had declared they did not want to cohabit with the rebels, continued to camp in the Kibaya of Bunagana, on the Ugandan side, awaiting the rebels' withdrawal from the Bunagana-Rutshuru-Kiwanja axis. Meanwhile, Burundian troops deployed on the Sake-Kilolirwe-Kitchanga-Mweso axis established their presence where M23 rebels were still positioned. Precursor detachments of soldiers from the South Sudan People's Defense Forces (SPLA) arrived in Goma on April 2–3 to reinforce the EAC regional force. On April 4, M23 rebels withdrew from Kitchanga and left the villages of Luhanga and Mpati after their withdrawal from the agglomeration of Mweso and other small villages around Kitchanga. The same day, Radio Okapi reported that the rebels had already withdrawn from almost the entire Bashali-Kaembe groupement, except Kilolirwe, where they remained.

On April 30, armed men associated with M23 rebels killed a man and injured his wife and children in an incursion. On May 9, the humanitarian organization Médecins Sans Frontières (MSF) reported having provided care to 674 survivors of sexual violence during the last two weeks of April in IDP camps around Goma. On June 13, Human Rights Watch accused M23 rebels of murders, summary executions, and rapes in a statement released in Nairobi. Human Rights Watch documented eight illegal executions and 14 cases of rape committed by M23 rebels, as well as receiving credible information about more than a dozen other summary executions committed by M23. Seven other people were killed and three others injured during indiscriminate bombings on populated areas, including Kanombe, Kitshanga in Rutshuru Territory, and near Mushaki during the M23 attack.

On July 2, clashes between M23 and Wazalendo in Nturo village resulted in ten deaths and several injuries. In Rutshuru, locals reported hundreds of M23/Rwandan Defense Force (RDF) soldiers passing through Kinihira towards Jomba. On July 4, Wazalendo intercepted a Burundian EAC convoy near Sake in retaliation against earlier clashes with M23 near Kilolirwe. On August 23, M23 kidnapped over 350 people from Rushebeshe village, prompting civil society accusations on August 27 of M23 atrocities including murders, assassinations, rape as a weapon of war, local abductions, town burnings, inhumane treatment of hostages, and systematic looting. On September 20, clashes between Wazalendo and M23 displaced villagers towards Kalengera, Rugogwe, and Mweso. On October 6, fighting between M23 and Wazalendo on the Kitchanga-Burungu-Kilolirwe axis halted traffic between Goma and northern North Kivu Province. Wazalendo subsequently gained control of Kitchanga but faced a counterattack from M23, prompting them to temporarily withdraw to avoid collateral damage. By October 8, Wazalendo retook Nturo village and parts of Kitchanga and Kilolirwe, fully reclaiming Kitchanga and Burungu by October 9. However, on October 21, Kitchanga fell once more to M23 after intense clashes with Wazalendo within the town, positioning their most advanced outposts at Ndondo (3 km north of Kitchanga), Kinyumba (5 km west), and Burungu. Stray bullets during these clashes claimed two civilian lives and injured five others, prompting widespread displacement.

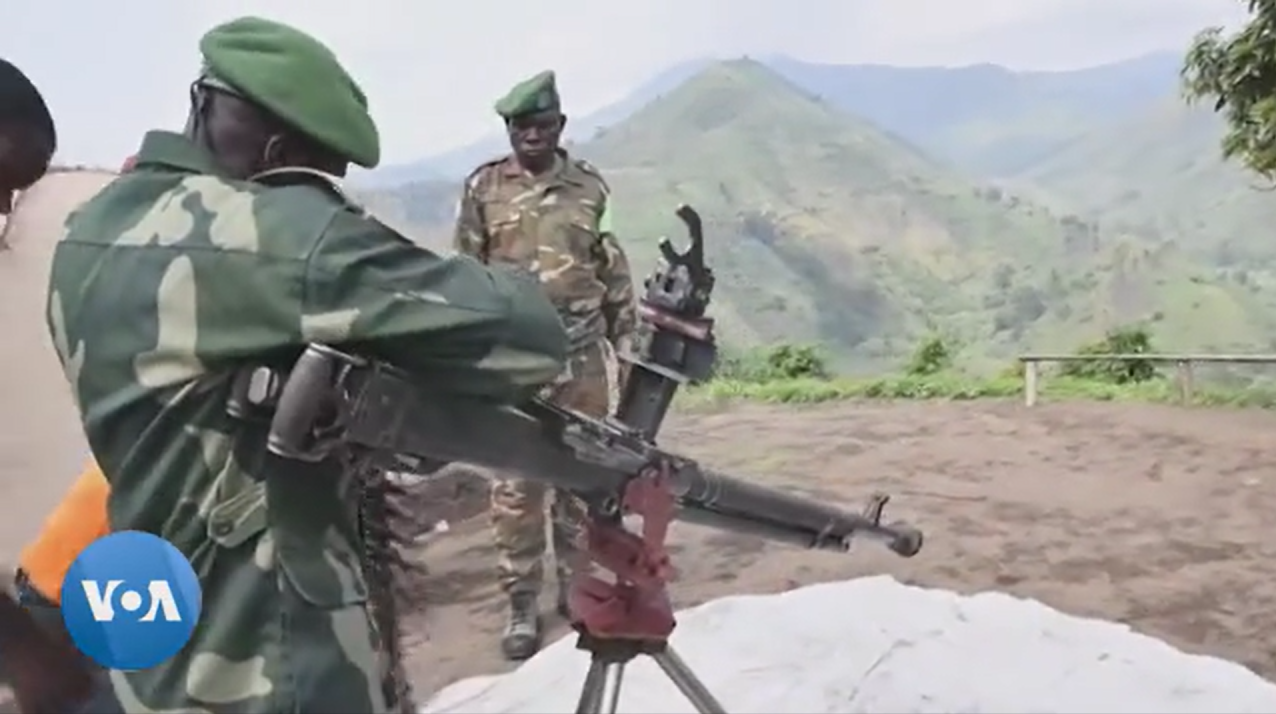
FARDC-aligned Wazalendo fighters in Kitchanga following the Second Battle of Kitchanga.

As of October 23, the provincial civil society coordination in North Kivu reported nearly 20 fatalities and 22 injuries for the month. On November 5, the villages of Nyakabingu, Kabalekasha, and Rushebeshe fell under M23 control, supported by the Rwandan army, following engagements with Wazalendo. The M23 continued launching attacks to sever traffic between Kitchanga and Goma, aiming to reclaim their former positions as far as Kilolirwe. On November 9, FARDC conducted aerial bombings on M23 positions in Kilolirwe and surrounding areas such as Kausa and Muyange along the Masisi-Kitchanga axis. Burundian troops temporarily withdrew from Kitchanga, Mweso, and Kilolirwe for two days due to clashes between local militias and M23 rebels. The Burundian contingent criticized the East African Community-Rwandan forces' command for indifference toward the threats faced by their troops from M23 rebels.

On November 22, the RDF-M23 coalition reasserted control over Mweso following skirmishes with the FARDC and Wazalendo. Concurrent clashes were reported around Karenga, within the Virunga National Park, and Kilolirwe along the road to Kitchanga. By November 25, the FARDC had repelled the RDF-M23 coalition's advance towards Sake after confrontations in Kilolirwe along the Sake-Kitshanga axis. The intensifying conflict precipitated mass displacements, particularly from villages around Muhanga and Kibatsiro towards Mukoto monastery, Kahira, and Kirumbu, and from Nyamitaba towards Muheto, with some refugees reaching as far as Sake. Over six thousand households fled to Sake, dispersing across four impromptu sites: Kizimba, Zainab, Kyabiringa, and Mahyutsa, while others sought refuge in the EP Kamuronza and Institut Kiluku collective centers.

By early December, most EAC contingents had withdrawn from the DRC. On January 17, 2024, M23 insurgents expelled Wazalendo from Mushaki's center following intense fights in Karuba, Masisi Territory, while the EAC force remained deployed along this axis. Approximately 30,000 displaced persons from the Monkoto camp, 18 kilometers south of Kitchanga, vacated the camp under threat from M23, compelling them to return to their "original" localities. On January 24, at 7:30 a.m., Wazalendo and FARDC recaptured Mweso after three days of fierce combat, forcing the M23 rebels to retreat to the hills. On January 29, M23 forces launched several bombardments in Masisi Territory, impacting Sake and Mubambiro, located approximately 30 km from Goma. The attack resulted in two fatalities, 12 severe injuries, and the destruction of seven houses. On January 31, FARDC initiated an artillery offensive against M23 positions in Karuba, Mushaki, and Musekera, about ten kilometers from Sake towards the hills.

On February 29, at approximately 11 a.m. local time, two projectiles originating from the Kihuli hill summit, controlled by M23 rebels, struck the roundabout on the Kitchanga axis in Sake, damaging SAMIDRC armored vehicles and injuring two people (a civilian and a soldier from the Tanzanian contingent). As of May 8, the FARDC, supported by Wazalendo fighters, engaged in violent clashes with M23 rebels. These confrontations, involving heavy weaponry, occurred in the hills of Ngumba and Lutobogo, less than 5 km from Sake. M23 forces attempted an incursion from Kanve towards the RN2 national road, targeting entry into Sake. Their attempt was successfully repelled.

== Economy ==
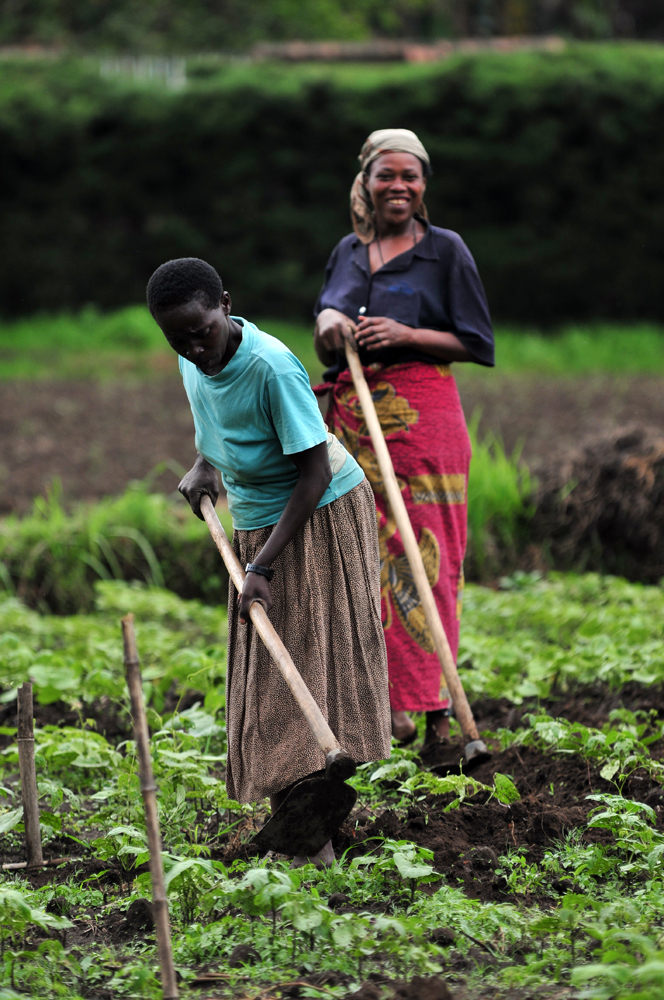
Scarlet runner beans flourishing in North Kivu

=== Agriculture and livestock ===
The chiefdom's economy is predominantly agropastoral. A significant portion of the population is engaged in both crop and livestock farming. Historically, the region's economy relied heavily on the industrial production of coffee, tea, cinchona, and tobacco. However, these activities declined sharply after the Zairianisation measures initiated in 1973, which led to the abandonment or destruction of many production units. The focus then shifted towards cattle production, which has often led to conflicts over land between livestock farmers and crop farmers.

=== Mineral resources ===
Bashali Chiefdom is rich in mineral resources, including cassiterite, coltan, tourmaline, and columbo-tantalite. However, the mining sector is plagued by challenges, as it remains largely artisanal and often illegal. The exploitation of these minerals has not benefited the local population; instead, it has resulted in significant social and environmental issues, turning potential developmental assets into sources of conflict and misery.

== Education and health infrastructure ==
=== Education ===
The chiefdom has made some progress in education, boasting 221 primary schools, 95 secondary schools, and two institutions of higher education: the Institut Supérieur d'Etudes Agronomiques et Forestières and the Institut Supérieur de Développement Rural des Grands Lacs. Despite these efforts, gender disparity is a significant issue, with females comprising only 17% of students enrolled as of 2011.

=== Health ===
Health services in Bashali Chiefdom are divided among four zones: Masisi, Kirotshe, Pinga, and Mweso. The chiefdom is served by four reference hospitals located in Masisi, Kirotshe, Pinga, and Mweso, as well as 13 health centers spread across the region. These health centers are located in Burungu, Kausa, Kanyatsi, Kalonge, Muheto, Nyamitaba, Pinga, Mweso, Kitchanga, Lukweti, Tambi-Kahira, and Kalembe of Nyakariba.
