= Nyanzale =

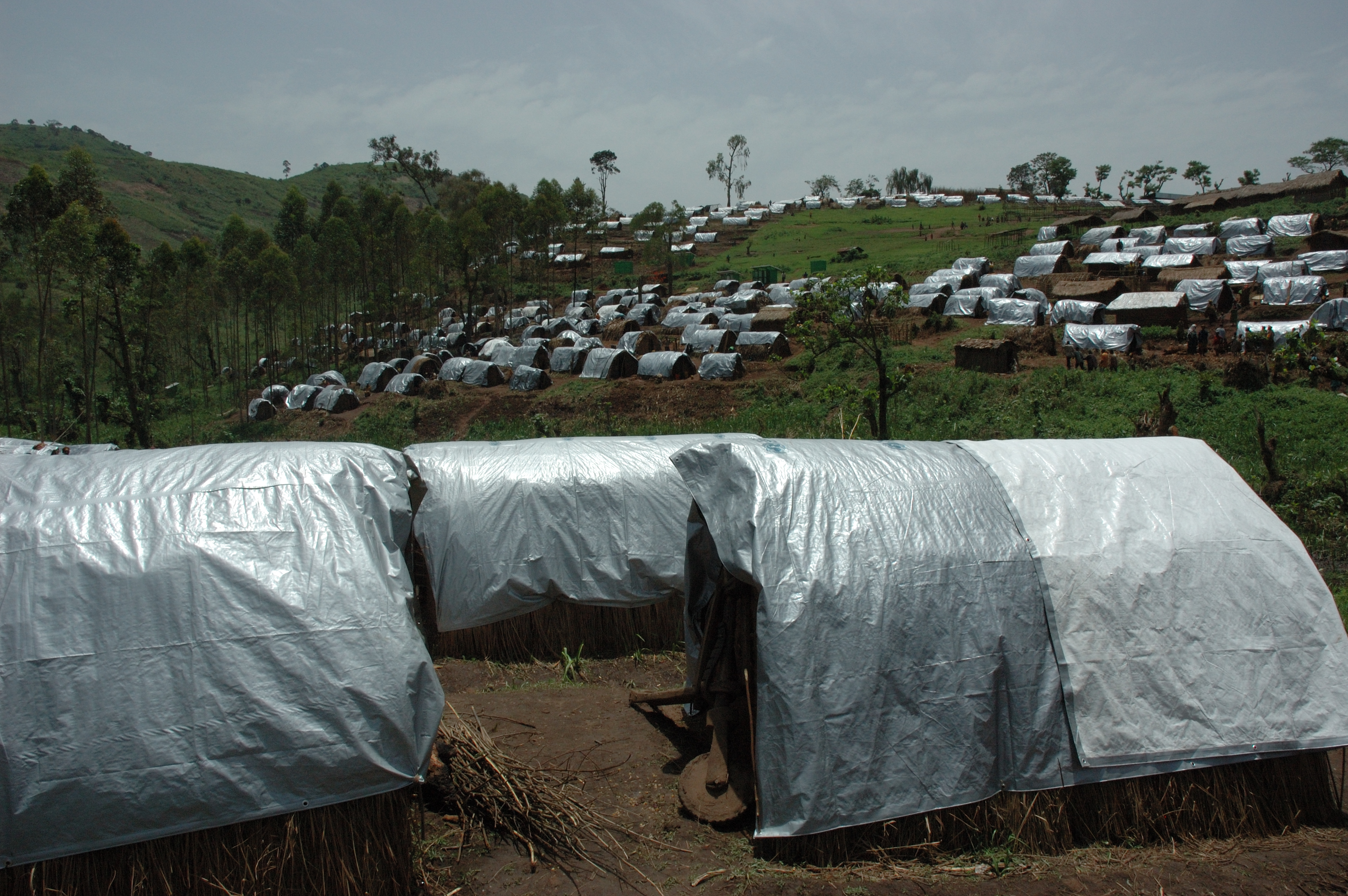
- Nyanzale camp

- Location within Democratic Republic of the Congo
- Coordinates: 0.774856°S 29.125099°E
- Country: Democratic Republic of the Congo
- Province: North Kivu
- Territory: Rutshuru

Nyanzale is a town and a camp for Internally Displaced People (IDPs) in the Rutshuru territory of North Kivu province, Democratic Republic of the Congo.

Nyanzale is about 130 kilometres (81 mi) north of Goma and 10 kilometres (6.2 mi) south of Kanya Bayonga. It is a small town whose population has more than doubled with the arrival of 20,000 displaced people from nearby villages of Kiwanja, Kinyandonyi, Kiseguru, Kisharo, Nyamilima, Ngwenda, Nyabanira, Kibututu, Umoja and Buturande. They fled in January 2007 out of fear of fighting between the rebels of the Forces Démocratiques pour la Libération du Rwanda and Forces Armées de la République Démocratique du Congo dominated by Laurent N'Kunda's soldiers. They are also avoiding armed bandits that live in the bush. Armed banditry is a problem, since unemployed soldiers and a surplus of small arms from years of fighting are a bad mix. Unicef tries to help the refugees.

== Gallery ==
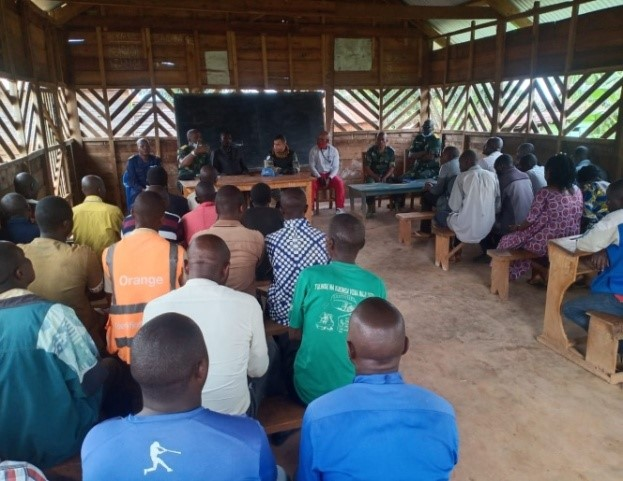
Meeting in Nyanzale 2022

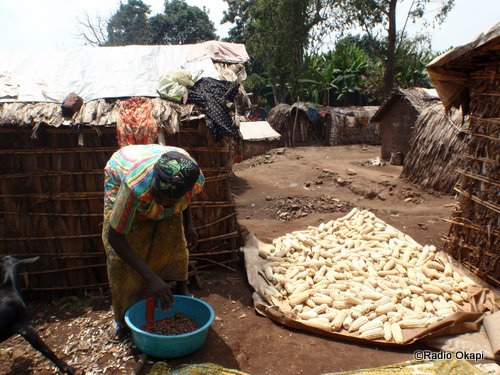
Displaced woman August 2010

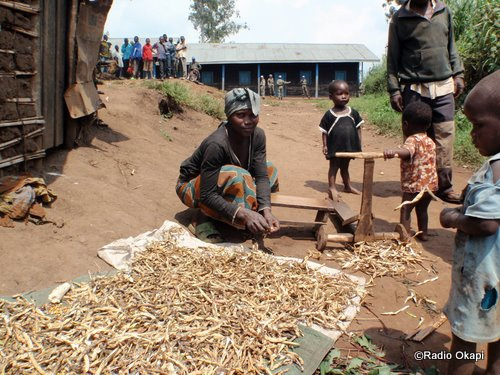
Displaced family August 2010

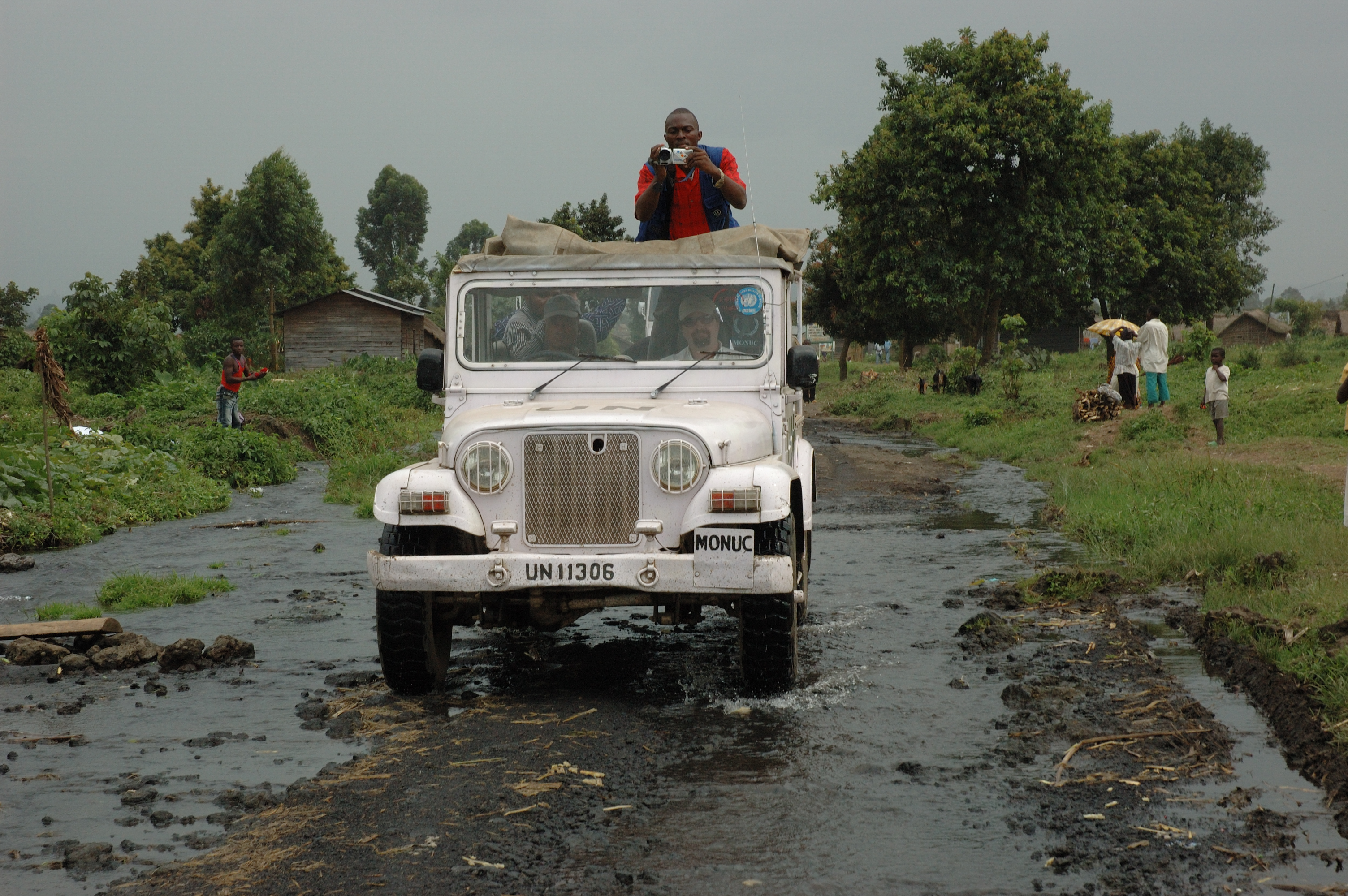
Jeep near Nyanzale

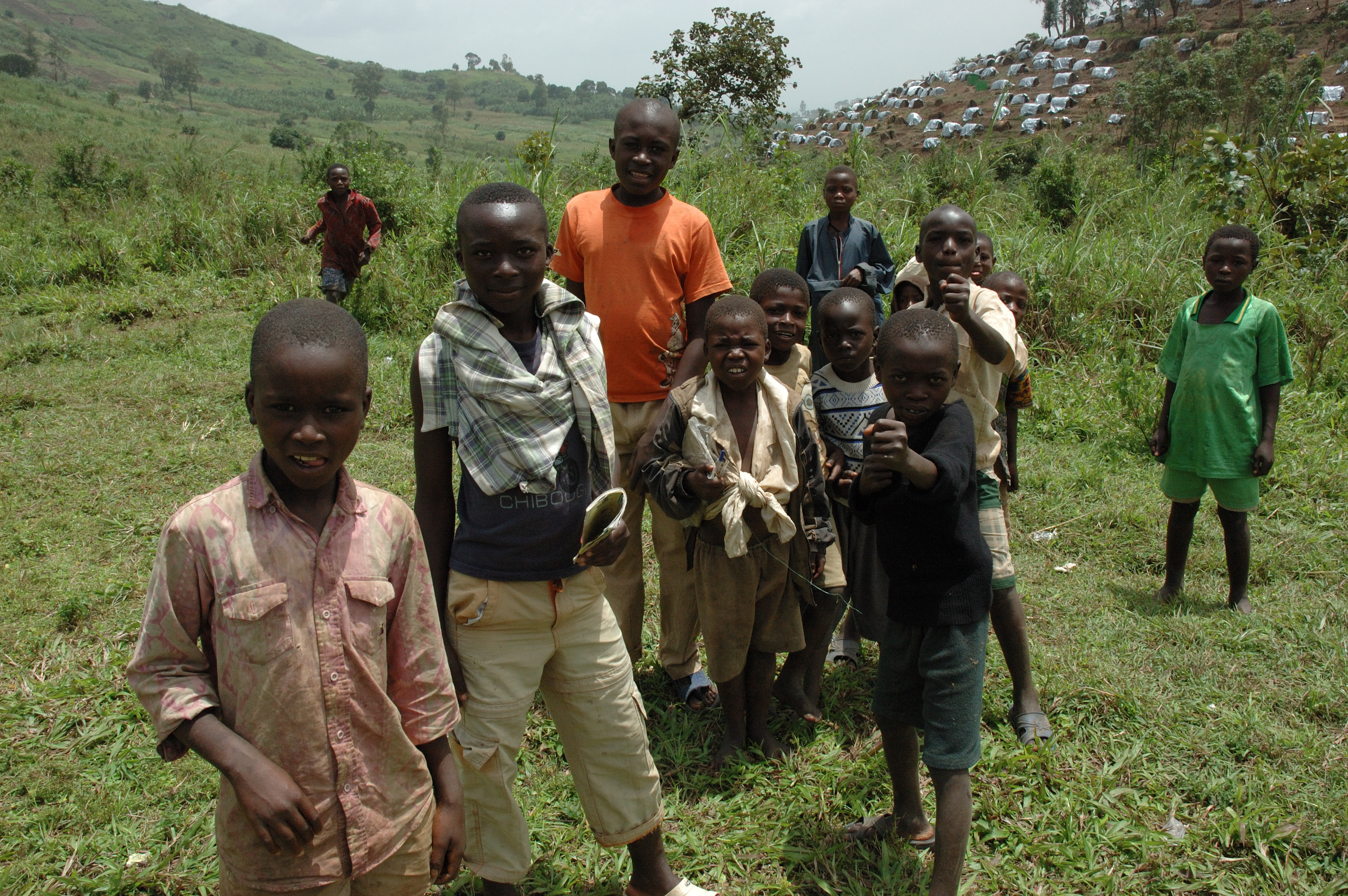
Children in the camp

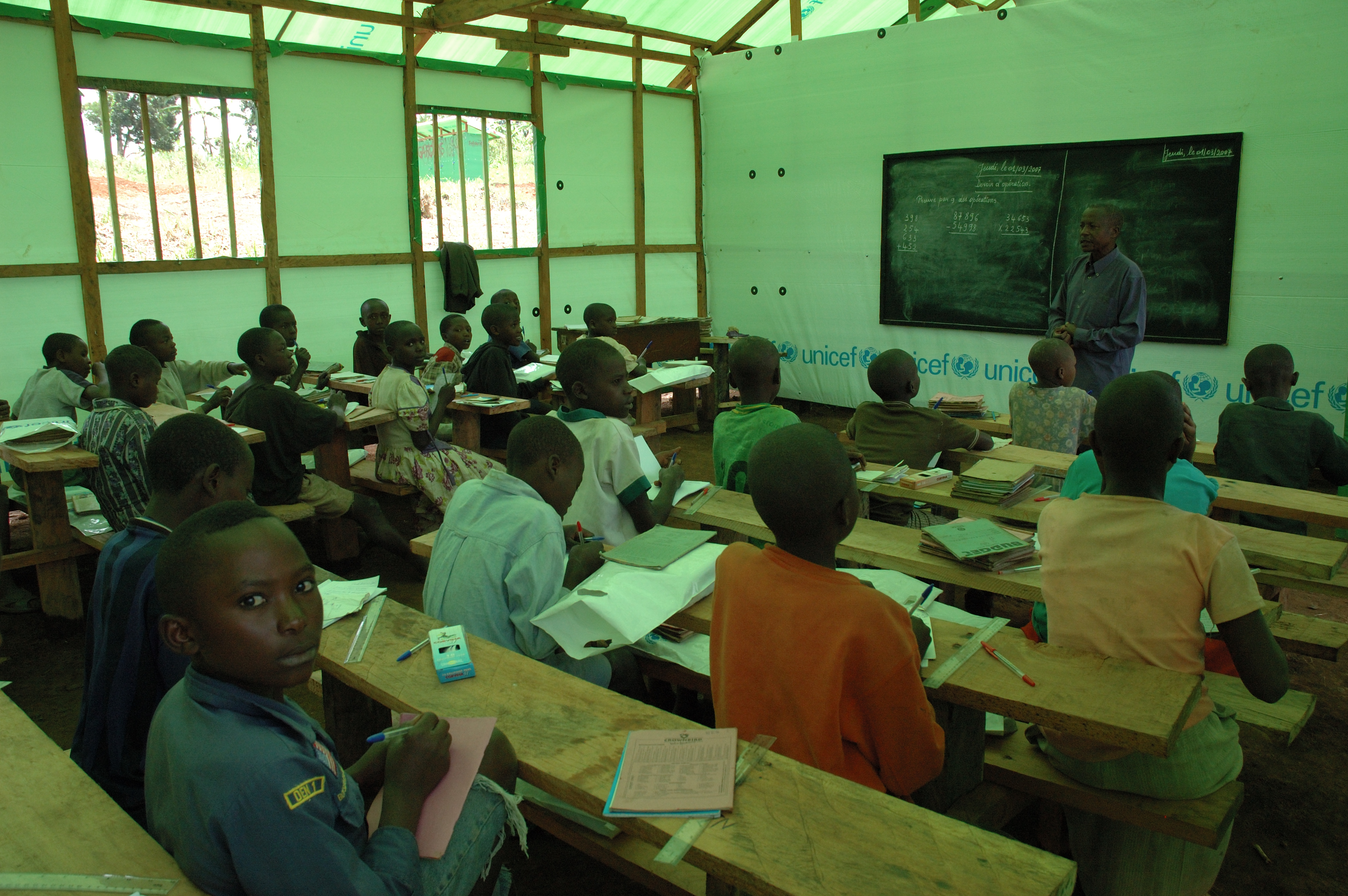
Emergency school, shared with people of the town
