= Kim Bolduc =

Canadian politician

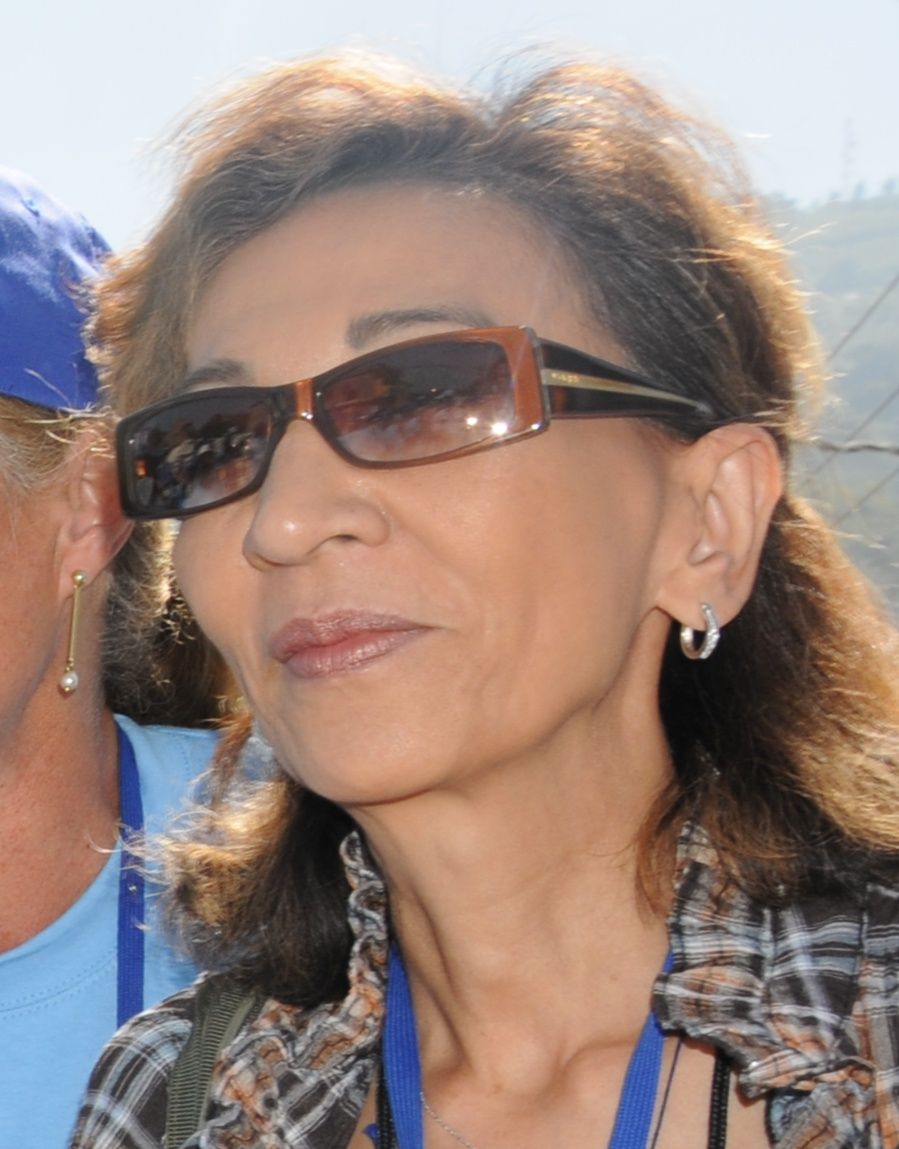
Kim Bolduc in 2010

Kim Bolduc is the Deputy Special Representative of United Nations Stabilization Mission in the Democratic Republic of Congo (MONUSCO). She served previously as the head of the United Nations Mission for the Referendum in Western Sahara (MINURSO) and the Deputy Special Representative for the United Nations Stabilization Mission in Haiti (MINUSTAH). In tandem, she will be also the United Nations Resident and Humanitarian Coordinator. She has previously held other positions with the United Nations.
