= Wildlife of Rwanda =

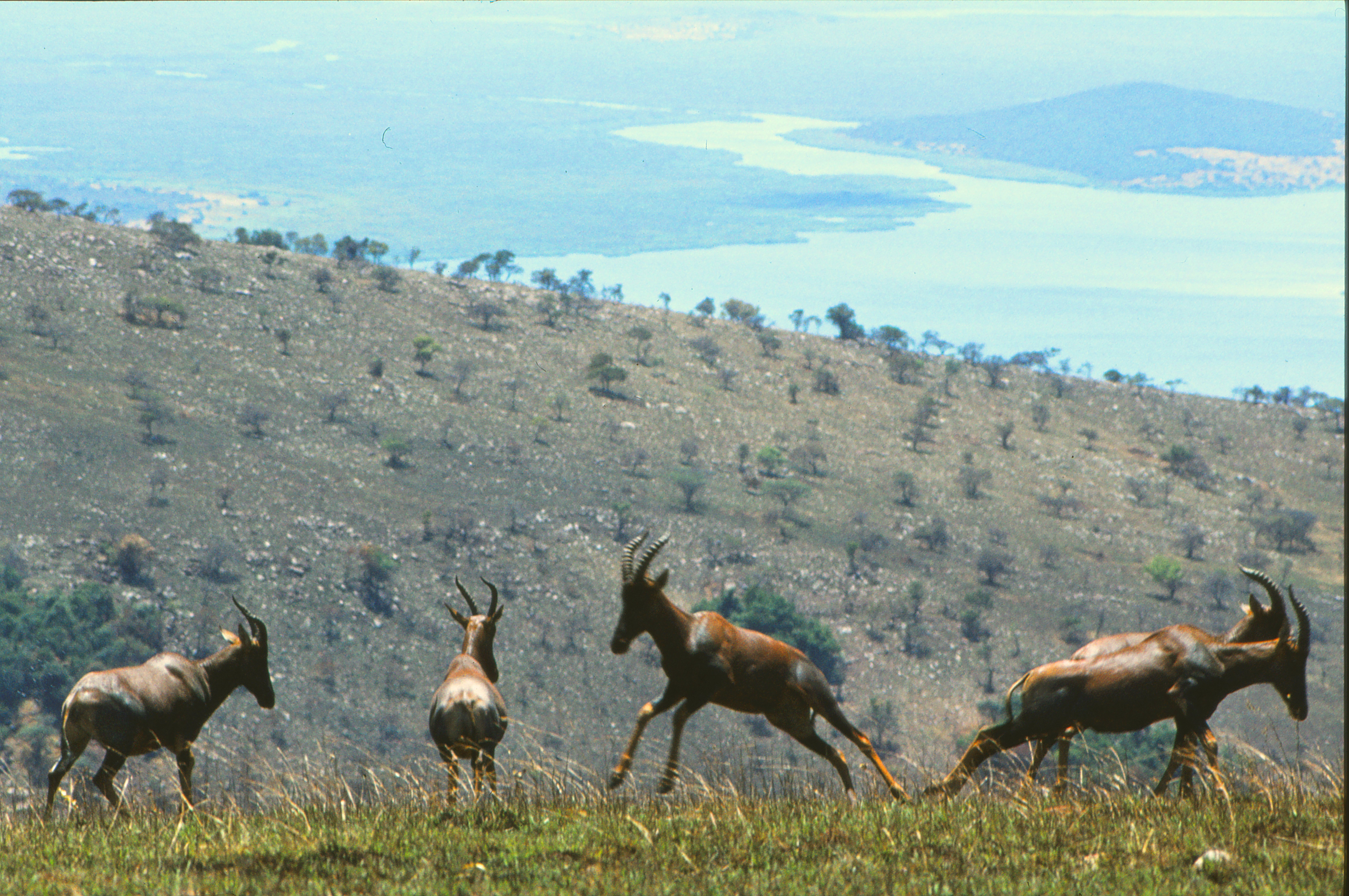
Topis in Akagera National Park

The wildlife of Rwanda comprising its flora and fauna, in prehistoric times, consisted of montane forest in one third the territory of present-day Rwanda. However, natural vegetation is now mostly restricted to the three national parks and four small forest reserves, with terraced agriculture dominating the rest of the country.

== Geography ==
Rwanda is a landlocked country in Central Africa, bordered by Burundi, Democratic Republic of the Congo, Tanzania, and Uganda. It measures 26,338 square kilometres (10,169 sq mi), of which 26,668 square kilometres (10,297 sq mi) is land and 1,670 square kilometres (640 sq mi) is water. Its highest point is Volcan Karisimbi at 4,519 metres (14,826 ft), while its lowest point is the Rusizi River at 950 metres (3,120 ft). Rwanda's geography is dominated by savanna grassland with approximately 46 percent considered arable land and 9.5 percent dedicated to permanent crops. Grassy uplands and hills are predominant characteristics of the terrain, while the country's relief is described as mountainous, its altitude demonstrating a decline from the west towards the east.

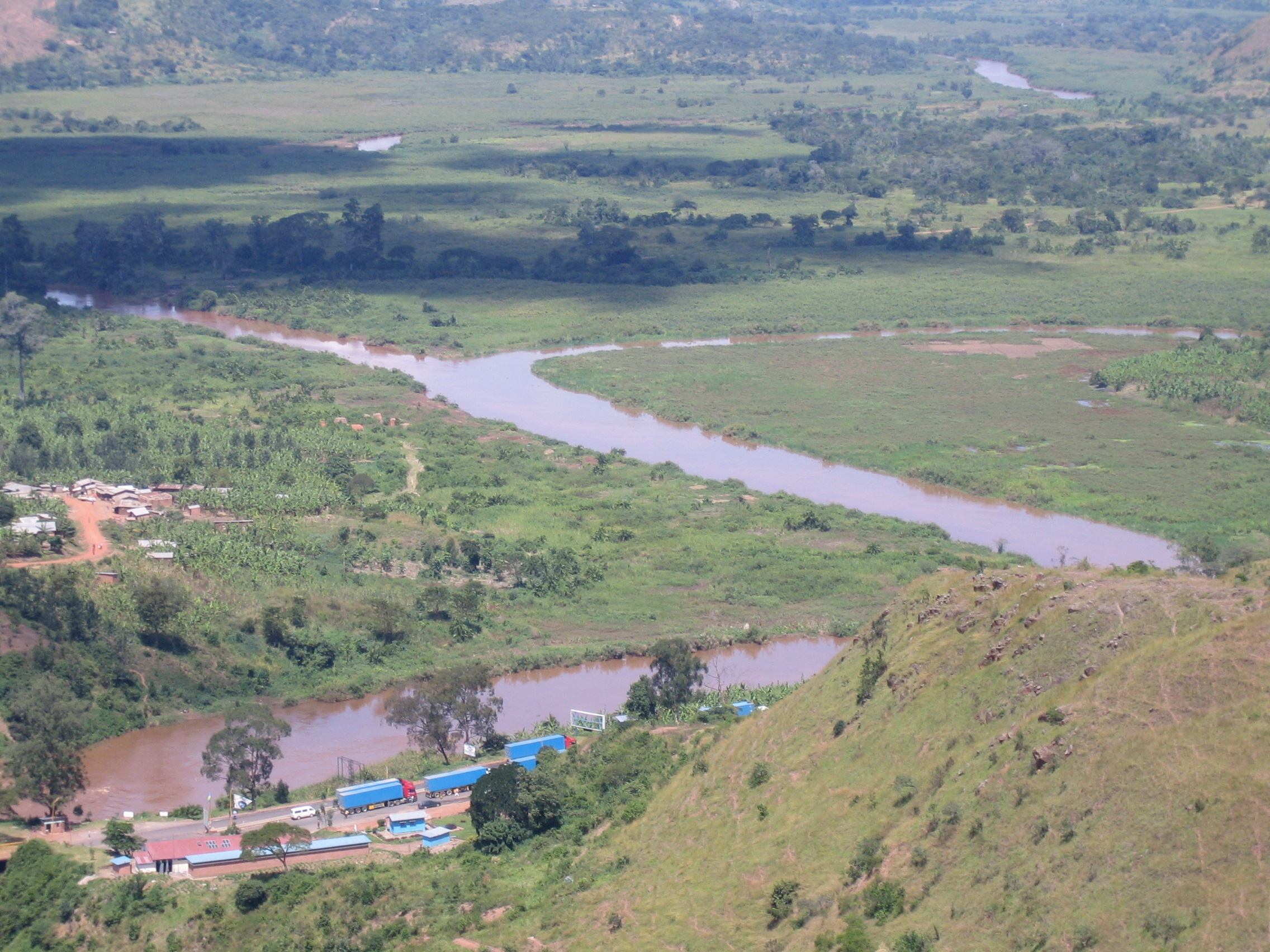
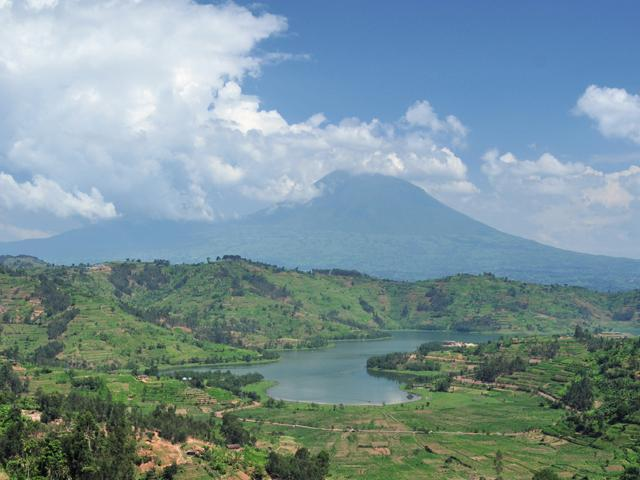
Left: The confluence of the Kagera and Ruvubu rivers near Rusumo Falls, Rwanda/Tanzania. Right: Volcanoes National Park (background) encompasses a portion of the Virungas volcanic chain, the last habitat of the mountain gorilla.

A unique feature in the geography and geology of Rwanda is Africa's Great Rift Valley. As part of this rift, Albertine Rift passes through the Nyungwe forest. It is a mountainous feature that "as a whole, harbors more endemic birds, mammals, and amphibians than any other region in Africa".

A rift valley is defined as: "A rift is where sections of the earth are slowly spreading apart over millions of years, creating mountains, lakes, valleys and volcanoes." Another feature is the Congo-Nile Divide. This mountain range passes through Rwanda in a north to south direction.

Nyabarongo River is a major river in Rwanda, part of the upper headwaters of the Nile and accounts for nearly 66% of the water resources of the country fed by a catchment which receives an annual average rainfall of more than 2,000 mm.

The country has a temperate climate with rainy seasons twice per year, February to April and again November to January. Temperatures in the mountains are mild, though there is the possibility of frost and snow.

== Protected areas ==
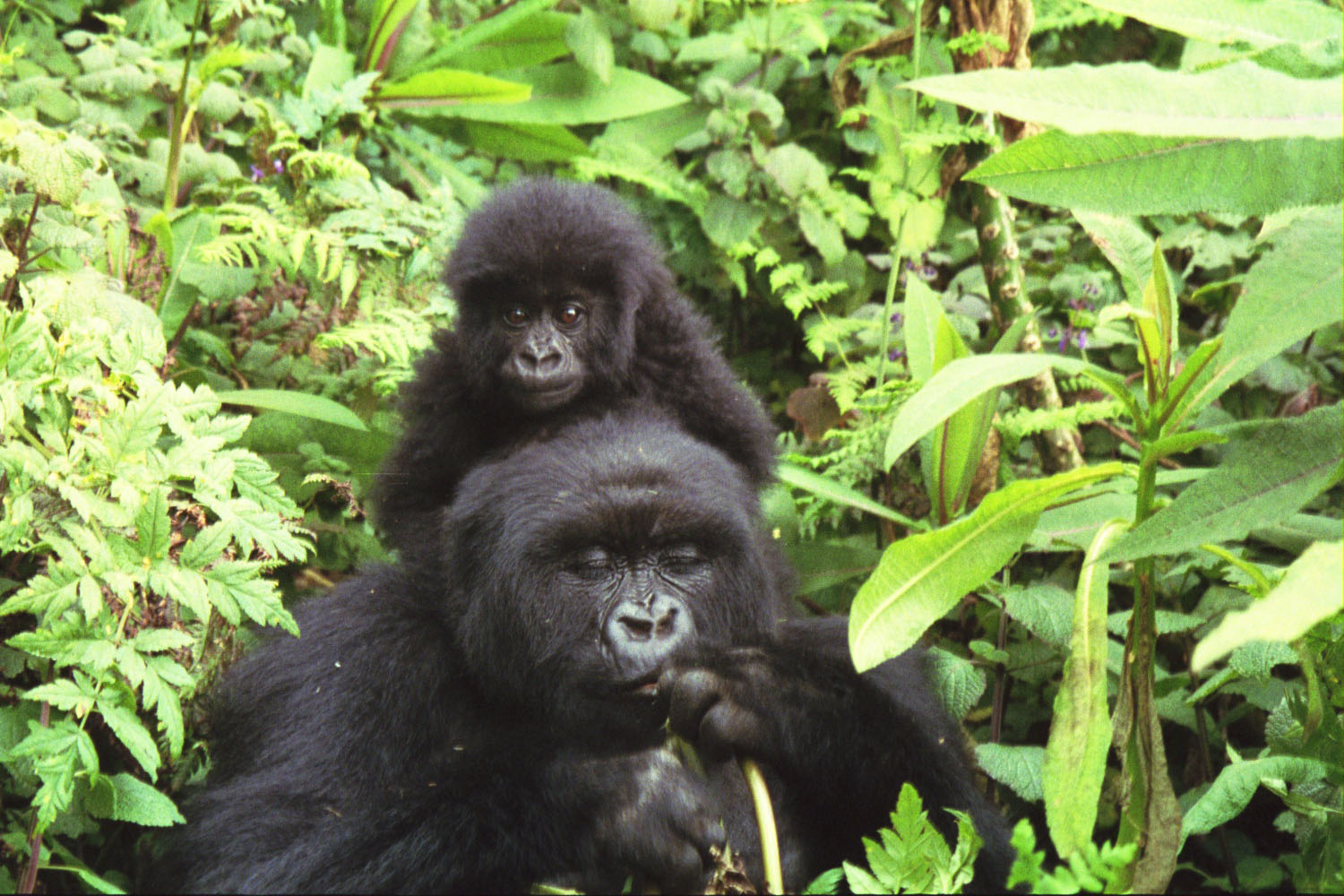
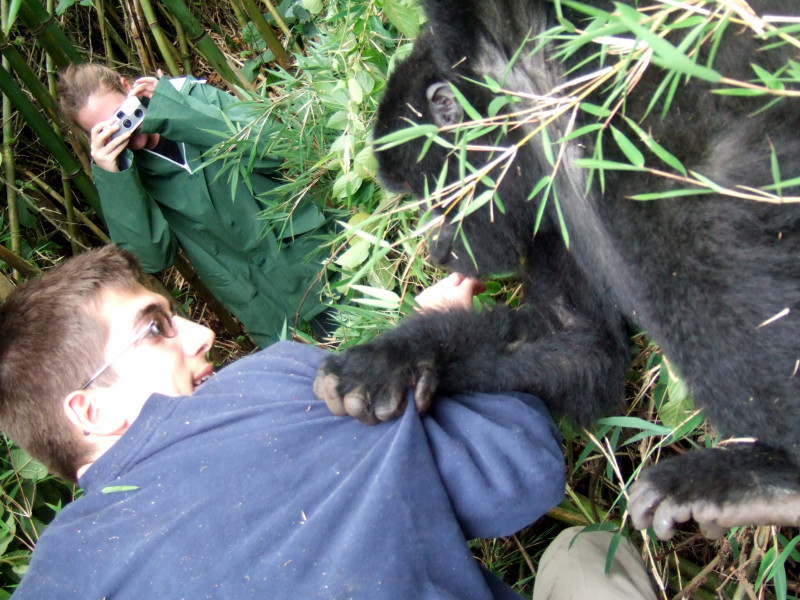
Left: Gorilla mother and child in Volcanoes National Park. Right: Young gorilla grabs tourist at Volcanoes National Park

There are only three protected areas established as national parks. The Akagera National Park covers 108,500 ha, Nyungwe National Park covers 101,900 ha and Volcanoes National Park covers 16,000 ha. In addition the forest reserves are the Gishwati Forest Reserve (700 ha), Mukura Forest Reserve (1600 ha), Busaga Forest Reserve (150 ha) and Buhanga forest and gallery forest in the eastern province (about 160 ha).

Nyungwe is the largest remaining tract of forest. It contains 200 species of tree as well as orchids and begonias. Vegetation in the Volcanoes National Park is mostly bamboo and moorland, with small areas of forest. By contrast, Akagera has a savanna ecosystem in which acacia dominates the flora. There are several rare or endangered plant species in Akagera, including Markhamia lutea and Eulophia guineensis.

In 2020, Gishwati-Mukura National Park was designated a World Biosphere Reserve.

According to Audrey Azoulay, Director General of UNESCO, in the Rwandan reserves, "species conservation succeeds when local communities are placed at the heart of the conservation strategy. Measures to protect biodiversity must go hand in hand with measures that meet the needs of these local communities". In Rwanda, the cost of a visit to see the gorillas is $1,500 per person. Under Rwandan law, 10% of these revenues must be returned to the community, which represents around 10 million euros invested in the construction of schools, roads and drinking water supplies. In 1980, there were just 250 mountain gorillas; today there are 1,063, 80% of them in Rwanda."

== Flora ==
Nymphaea thermarum is endemic to Rwanda.

The forest cover in Rwanda as of 2007 accounted for 240,746 ha comprising humid natural forests in 33.15% area, degraded natural forests covering 15.79%, bamboo forest of 1.82%, savannas accounting for 1.55%, large eucalyptus plantations to the extent of 26.4%, recent plantations of eucalyptus and coppices and 5.01 percent of Pinus plantations. Montane forest, one of the most ancient forests dated to even before the Last Ice Age which has a richness of 200 species of trees, many flowering plants including the giant lobelia and many colourful orchids. There are more than 140 species of orchids in the wildlife area of Nyungwe forest.

There are four defined forest categories. These are the Congo Nile Ridge Forest, a natural forest that encompasses the national parks and reserves; the savanna and gallery-forests; forest plantations consisting of species of Eucalyptus, Pinus, and Grevillea robusta; and agroforestry areas in farmlands and also anti-erosion measures.

The world's smallest water lily, Nymphaea thermarum, was endemic not only to Rwanda but to the damp mud formed by the overflow of a freshwater hot spring in Mashyuza. It became extinct in the wild about 2008 when local farmers began using the spring for agriculture. The farmers cut off the flow of the spring, which dried up the tiny area—just a few square meters—that was the lily's entire habitat. Carlos Magdalena, at the Royal Botanic Gardens in Kew, managed to germinate some of the last 20 seeds; eight began to flourish and mature within weeks, and in November 2009, the waterlilies flowered for the first time. A wild population of Nymphaea thermarum was discovered in 2023.

== Fauna ==
The greatest diversity of large mammals is found in the three national parks, which are designated conservation areas. Akagera contains typical savanna animals such as giraffes and elephants, while Volcanoes National Park is home to an estimated one third of the worldwide mountain gorilla population.

Nyungwe Forest boasts thirteen primate species including chimpanzees and Ruwenzori colobus. The Ruwenzori colobus moves in groups of up to 400 individuals, the largest troop size of any primate in Africa. Twenty species of mammals reported by Animal Diversity Web are listed below.

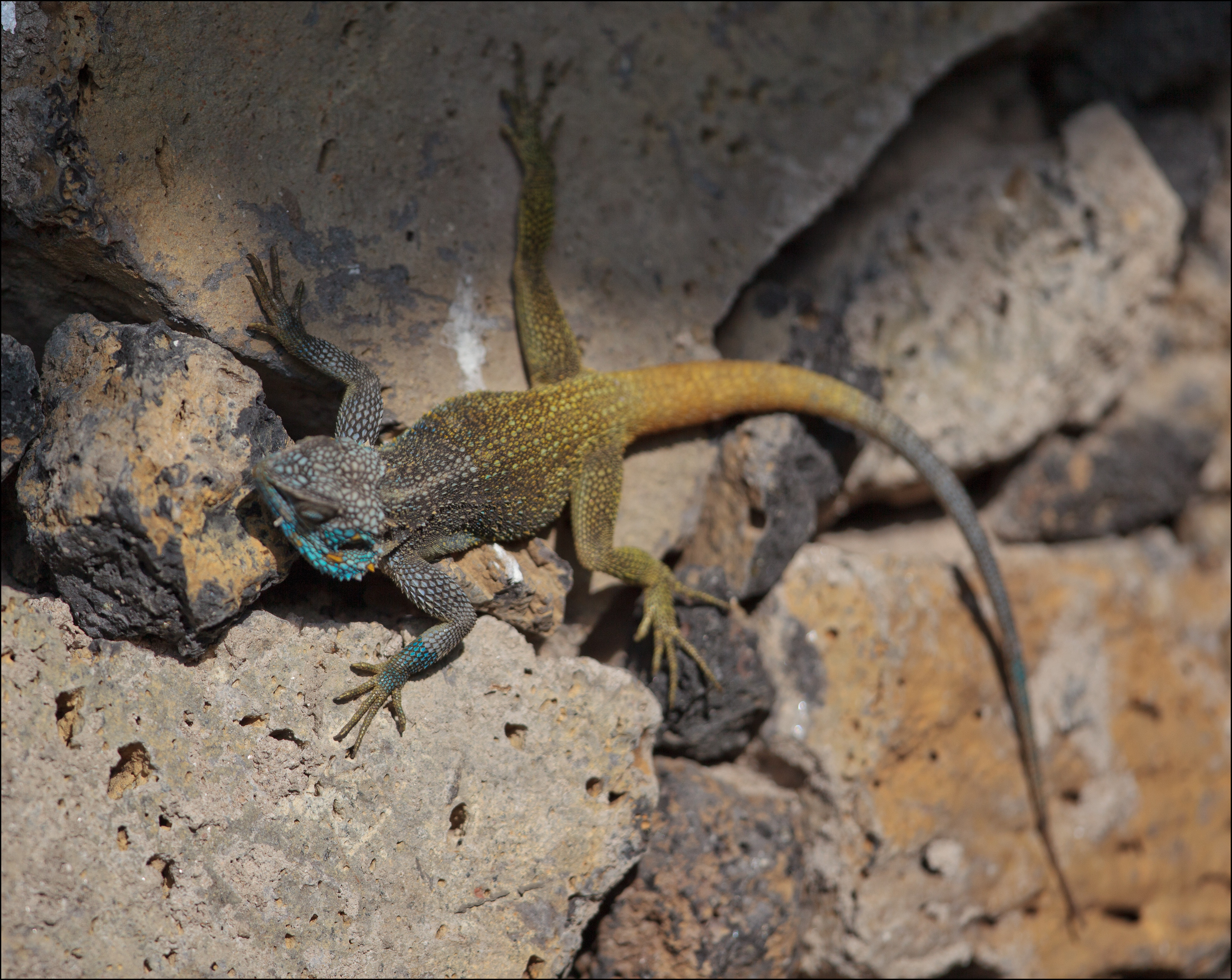
Acanthocercus atricollis on the shores of Lac Kivu in Rwanda.

- Dendrohyrax arboreus (eastern tree hyrax)
- Delanymyinae (Delany's swamp mice)
- Cercopithecus lhoesti (L'hoest's monkey)
- Cercopithecus hamlyni (owl-faced monkey)
- Colobus angolensis (Angolan colobus)
- Scutisorex somereni (armored shrew)
- Gorilla beringei (eastern gorilla)
- Profelis aurata (African golden cat)
- Gorilla gorilla (western gorilla)
- Galago moholi (South African galago)
- Aonyx capensis (African clawless otter)
- Equus burchellii (Burchell's zebra)
- Hippopotamus amphibius (hippopotamus)
- Aepyceros melampus (impala)
- Colobus guereza (guereza)
- Epomops franqueti (Franquet's epauletted bat)

Primates are the dominant species of fauna in the Nyungwe Forest. The species reported are Ruwenzori colobus, L'Hoest's monkeys and chimpanzees (largest concentration of 13 species). An amphibian species reported is the common reed frog (Hyperolius viridiflavus).

=== Birds ===
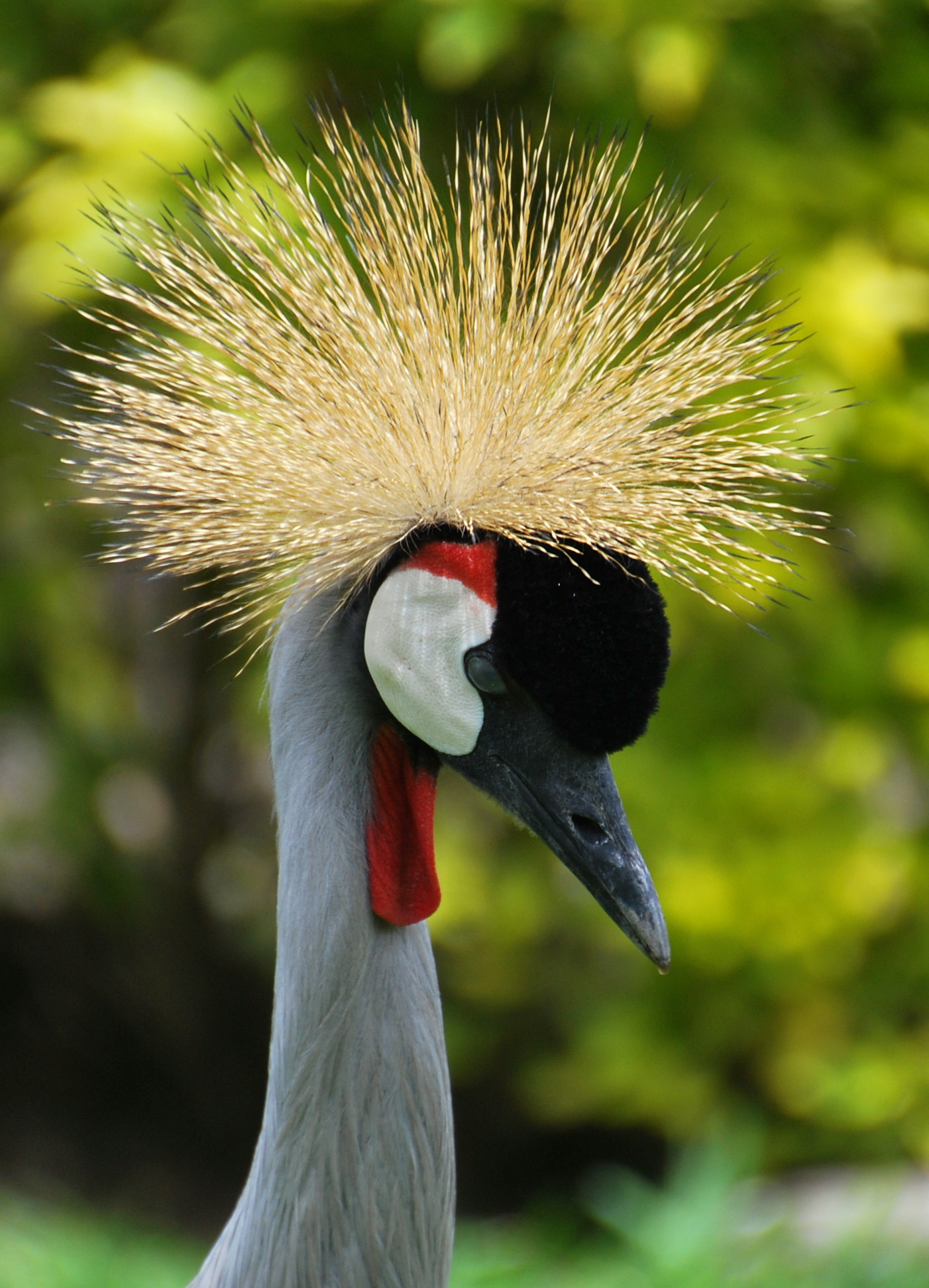
Grey crowned crane in Ruhengeri, Rwanda

There were 670 bird species in Rwanda, with variation between the east and the west. However, as per the Birdlist Organization the number of species as per the World Institute for Conservation and Environment criteria are reported to be 711. Nyungwe Forest, in the west, has 280 recorded species, of which 26 are endemic to the Albertine Rift; endemic species include the Rwenzori turaco and handsome spurfowl.

Eastern Rwanda, by contrast, features savanna birds such as the black-headed gonolek and those associated with swamps and lakes, including storks and cranes. Further, according to the Avibase, the globally endangered species are 9 and species introduced are 3 out of a total of 692 species as of 2012. Balaeniceps rex (shoebill) and Agapornis fischeri (Fischer's lovebird) are also reported.

Nyungwe forest is a designated Important Bird Area (IBA) by the BirdLife International. The great blue turaco is a very prominent bird species found in large numbers. It is blue, red and green, described as a "bird which streams from tree to tree like a procession of streamlined psychedelic turkeys". The European bee-eater (Merops apiaster) is a migrant bird species in this forest area during the winter season. The Rugezi Marsh shelters Rwanda's largest breeding population of grey crowned cranes. The strange weaver and the collared sunbird have been featured on Rwandan stamps.

The list of globally endangered bird species, as reported by the Avibase data of BirdLife International, are the following.

Endangered

- Ardeola idae (Madagascar pond-heron)
- Necrosyrtes monachus (hooded vulture)
- Gyps africanus (white-backed vulture)
- Gyps rueppellii (Rueppell's griffon)
- Balearica regulorum (gray crowned-crane)
- Bradypterus graueri (Grauer's swamp-warbler)

Near threatened

- Ficedula semitorquata (semicollared flycatcher)
- Malaconotus lagdeni (Lagden's bushshrike)
- Laniarius mufumbiri (papyrus gonolek)
- Agapornis fischeri (Fischer's lovebird)
- Falco concolor (sooty falcon)
- Falco vespertinus (red-footed falcon)
- Indicator pumilio (dwarf honeyguide)
- Lybius rubrifacies (red-faced barbet)
- Coracias garrulus (European roller)
- Rynchops flavirostris (African skimmer)
- Glareola nordmanni (black-winged pratincole)
- Gallinago media (great snipe)
- Limosa limosa (black-tailed godwit)
- Numenius arquata (Eurasian curlew)
- Neotis denhami (Stanley bustard)
- Circus macrourus (pallid harrier)
- Polemaetus bellicosus (martial eagle)
- Stephanoaetus coronatus (crowned hawk-eagle)
- Terathopius ecaudatus (bateleur)
- Oxyura maccoa (Maccoa duck)
- Phoenicopterus minor (lesser flamingo)

Vulnerable

- Balaeniceps rex (shoebill)
- Sagittarius serpentarius (secretary-bird)
- Trigonoceps occipitalis (white-headed vulture)
- Circaetus beaudouini (Beaudouin's snake-eagle)
- Glaucidium albertinum (Albertine owlet)
- Bucorvus leadbeateri (southern ground-hornbill)
- Hirundo atrocaerulea (blue swallow)
- Calamonastides gracilirostris (papyrus yellow-warbler)
- Cryptospiza shelleyi (Shelley's crimson-wing)

== Conservation ==
The national parks and forest reserves are under threat due to poaching, invasive plants such as water hyacinth, unauthorized livestock grazing, illegal fishing, bush fires, mining, bamboo harvesting, encroachment of protected land for agricultural farming, firewood gathering, be keeping and herbal plant extraction. This situation is attributed to governance issues lacking in legal acts and guidelines and also heavy anthropogenic pressure.

Conservation management plans have been instituted for all protected areas which involves the community of villages in and around the protected areas. Conservation activities have focused on increasing forest density by planting trees in a "natural self rehabilitation and natural regeneration of primary and high value species". The planting has involved Carissa macrocarpa, Entandrophragma (a genus of eleven species of deciduous trees) and Symphonia globulifera, and erecting protective fencing around forest reserves using leguminous thorny plants.

One of the efforts initiated by the government of Rwanda was to increase the number of protected areas and to proliferate tree plantations to increase the forest area cover of 10% to 20% by 2020.

== See also ==
- List of ecoregions in Rwanda

== Bibliography ==
- Booth, Janice (2006). Rwanda. Bradt Travel Guides. ISBN 978-1-84162-180-7.
- King, David C. (2007). Rwanda. Marshall Cavendish. ISBN 978-0-7614-2333-1.
- Wilson, Don E.; Reeder, DeeAnn M., eds. (2005). Mammal Species of the World: A Taxonomic and Geographic Reference (3rd ed). Johns Hopkins University Press.
- "Animal Diversity Web". University of Michigan Museum of Zoology. 1995–2006.
- "Akagera National Park". Embassy of Rwanda in Japan. 2009.
- Wildlife Conservation Society (WCS). "Birds endemic to the Albertine Rift" (PDF). Albertine Rift Programme.
- International Union for Conservation of Nature (IUCN) (2011). "IUCN welcomes Rwanda as new State Member".
