= National parks of Rwanda =

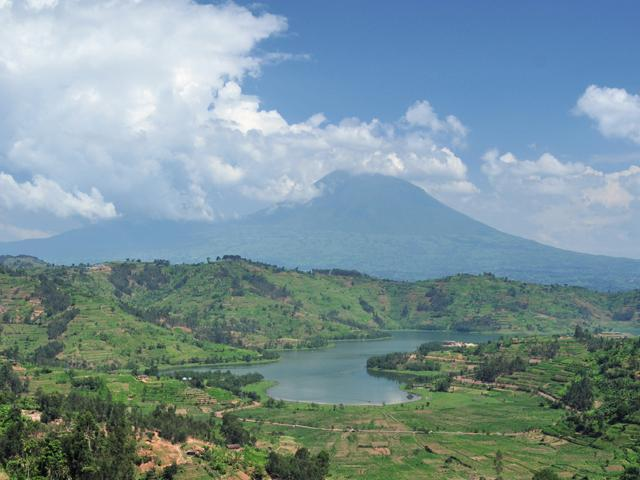
Volcanoes National Park (background) encompasses a portion of the Virungas volcanic chain, the last habitat of the mountain gorilla.

The national parks of Rwanda are protected ecosystems and wildlife reserves located within the borders of Rwanda in East Africa. Rwanda has four national parks: Volcanoes National Park, Akagera National Park, Nyungwe National Park and Gishwati-Mukura National Park. Maintenance of the national park system, as well as tourism infrastructure and promotion of the parks, is managed by the Rwanda Development Board (RDB) with assistance from government ministries.

== List of national parks of Rwanda ==
The table lists the national parks of Rwanda.

National parks of Rwanda
Park	Image	Province	Area (km²)	Established	Ecosystem and notable features
Volcanoes	Mount Sabyinyo	Northern, Western	160	1925	Montane forest and bamboo on the Virunga volcanoes; mountain gorillas, golden monkeys
Akagera	Lake Ihema	Eastern	1,122	1934	Savannah, lakes and papyrus swamps; "Big Five", including reintroduced lions and rhinoceroses
Nyungwe	Nyungwe forest	Western, Southern	1,019	1933 (reserve); 2005 (park)	Montane rainforest; 13 primate species including chimpanzees; UNESCO World Heritage Site (2023)
Gishwati-Mukura	Gishwati forest	Western	34	2015	Two remnant montane forests; chimpanzees, golden monkeys; UNESCO biosphere reserve (2020)

== Parks ==
Each park protects a distinct ecosystem and variety of species. The parks are managed by the Rwanda Development Board (RDB) with assistance from government ministries; Akagera and Nyungwe are managed jointly with the conservation organisation African Parks.

=== Volcanoes National Park ===
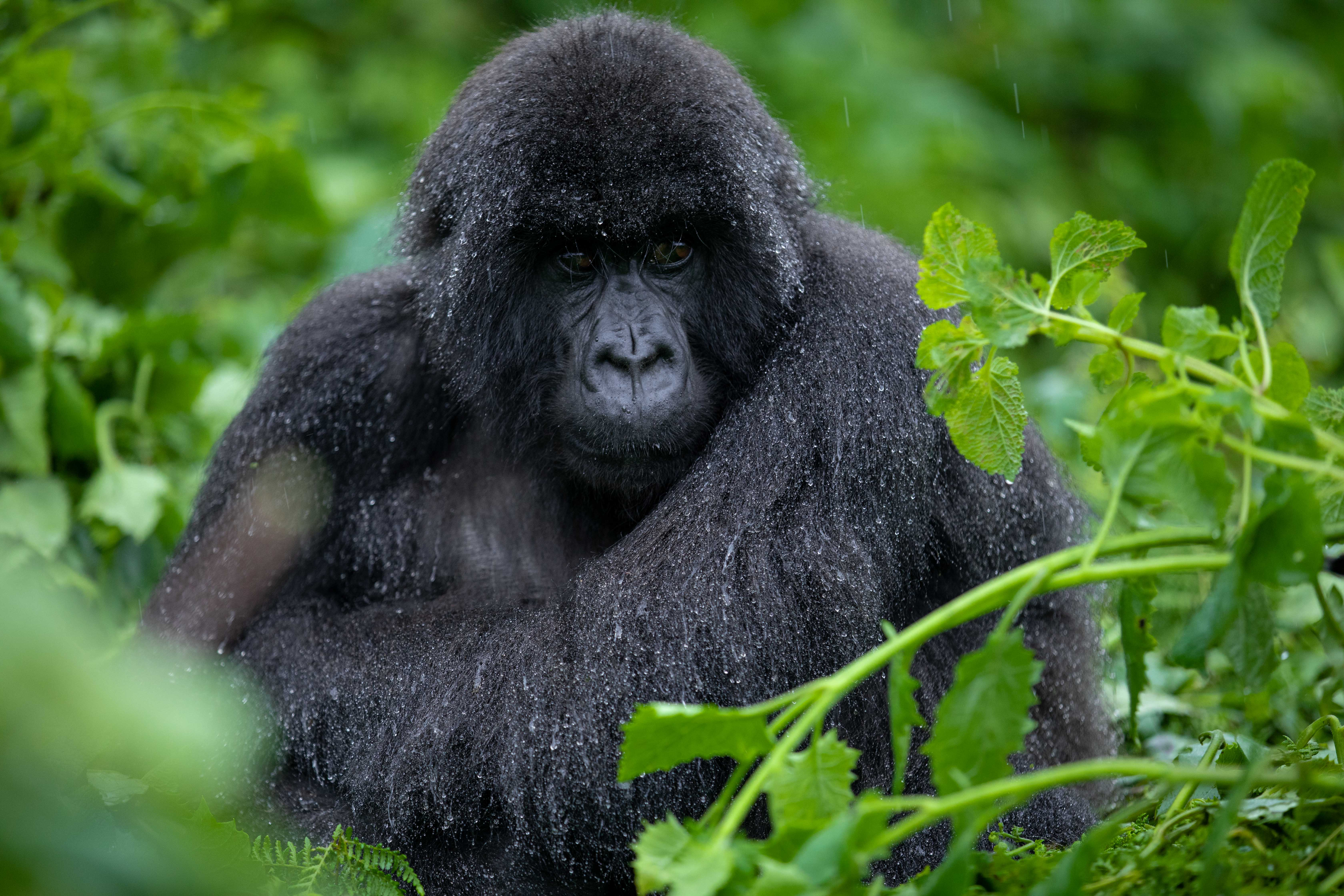
A mountain gorilla of the Susa group on the slopes of Karisimbi

Bordering the Democratic Republic of Congo and Uganda, into which the Virungas volcanic mountain chain extends, Volcanoes National Park is the most heavily patrolled park in the world and the oldest in Africa. In combination with adjoining parks in the neighboring countries, it serves as the world's only habitat of the mountain gorillas, whose numbers have been increasing here over the past decade. Visitor numbers to the gorillas are strictly limited and passes must be purchased, often well in advance, from RDB. Golden monkeys also inhabit a separate portion of the park.

The park protects the Rwandan slopes of five dormant volcanoes – Karisimbi (4,507 m (14,787 ft), the highest), Bisoke with its crater lake, Sabyinyo, Gahinga and Muhabura – covered by montane forest, bamboo, grassland, swamp and heath. More than 200 bird species have been recorded. Established in 1925 to protect the gorillas, it was enlarged in 1929 into the Belgian-administered Albert National Park and divided after Congolese (1960) and Rwandan (1962) independence; in 1967 Dian Fossey founded the Karisoke Research Center between Karisimbi and Bisoke.

=== Akagera National Park ===
Masai giraffes in Akagera National Park

Akagera National Park, along Rwanda's eastern border with Tanzania, protects a variety of African fauna in a savannah ecosystem, including giraffes, elephant, buffalo, baboons, gazelles and zebra. Lions also inhabited the park, but were exterminated by poisoning during and after the Rwandan genocide. However, in 2015, seven lions were reintroduced to Akagera, and the population has since increased to almost 40 individuals.

Founded in 1934, Akagera is Central Africa's largest protected wetland and Rwanda's last refuge for savannah-adapted species. It has been managed since 2010 by African Parks in partnership with the Rwanda Development Board. Eastern black rhinoceroses were reintroduced in 2017 and 2019, and southern white rhinoceroses in 2021 and 2025, so that the park now hosts the "Big Five"; nearly 500 bird species have been recorded. A dozen lakes, including Lake Ihema, offer boat trips to see hippopotamuses, Nile crocodiles and waterbirds.

=== Nyungwe National Park ===
Sunset over the forested hills of Nyungwe

To the southwest along the Burundian border, Nyungwe National Park hosts many chimpanzees and various other primate species in a highland rainforest environment.

Protected as a forest reserve since 1933 and a national park since 2005, Nyungwe lies between 1,480 and 2,950 m above sea level. It shelters 1,468 species of vascular plants, about one fifth of Africa's primate species and 317 bird species, and was inscribed on the UNESCO World Heritage List in 2023 – the first site in Rwanda. The park feeds both the Congo and Nile basins, provides about 70% of Rwanda's water, and has been managed by African Parks under a 20-year agreement signed in 2020.

=== Gishwati-Mukura National Park ===
Natural forest in Gishwati

In the north-west, Gishwati-Mukura National Park, created in 2015, protects two remnant montane forests, Gishwati and Mukura, on the ridge dividing the Congo and Nile basins. It is home to chimpanzees, golden monkeys, L'Hoest's monkeys and more than 230 bird species.

The smallest of Rwanda's national parks, it covers 34 km^{2} (13 sq mi) plus a buffer zone; its designation aimed to reverse decades of deforestation caused by resettlement, illegal mining and cattle farming. In October 2020 the Gishwati-Mukura landscape was designated a UNESCO biosphere reserve.

== See also ==
- Wildlife of Rwanda
- Tourism in Rwanda
- Geography of Rwanda
- List of World Heritage Sites in Rwanda
- Albertine Rift montane forests
- Rwanda Development Board
- African Parks
- List of national parks in Africa
