= Tourism in Rwanda =

Tourism is the largest source of foreign exchange earnings in Rwanda. It was projected to grow at a rate of 25% every year from 2013 to 2018. The sector is the biggest contributor to the national export strategy. Total revenue generated from the sector in 2014 alone was US$305 million.

== Overview ==
The tourism sector has attracted direct foreign investments. Major international hotel brands have set up shop in the country, including Marriott Hotels & Resorts, Radisson Blu, Park Inn by Radisson, Sheraton Hotels and Resorts, Protea Hotels by Marriott, Golden Tulip Hotels, and Zinc.

With the opening of the Kigali Convention Centre, Rwanda is set to become a regional and international conference hub owing to improving conference facilities, an expanding transportation network, and straightforward immigration procedures such as the ability for online visa applications, visa-free entry for all Africans, and a one-tourist visa policy for the EAC.

Tourism in the country is rapidly increasing. To further place Rwanda on the world map as a first-class tourism destination, the Rwanda Development Board (RDB), through the board's official tourism brand Visit Rwanda, signed partnership deals with multiple global sports teams including Arsenal FC, FC Bayern Munich, and the Los Angeles Clippers. This has lifted overall tourism numbers by 8%, according to Rwandan officials.

== Wildlife tourism ==
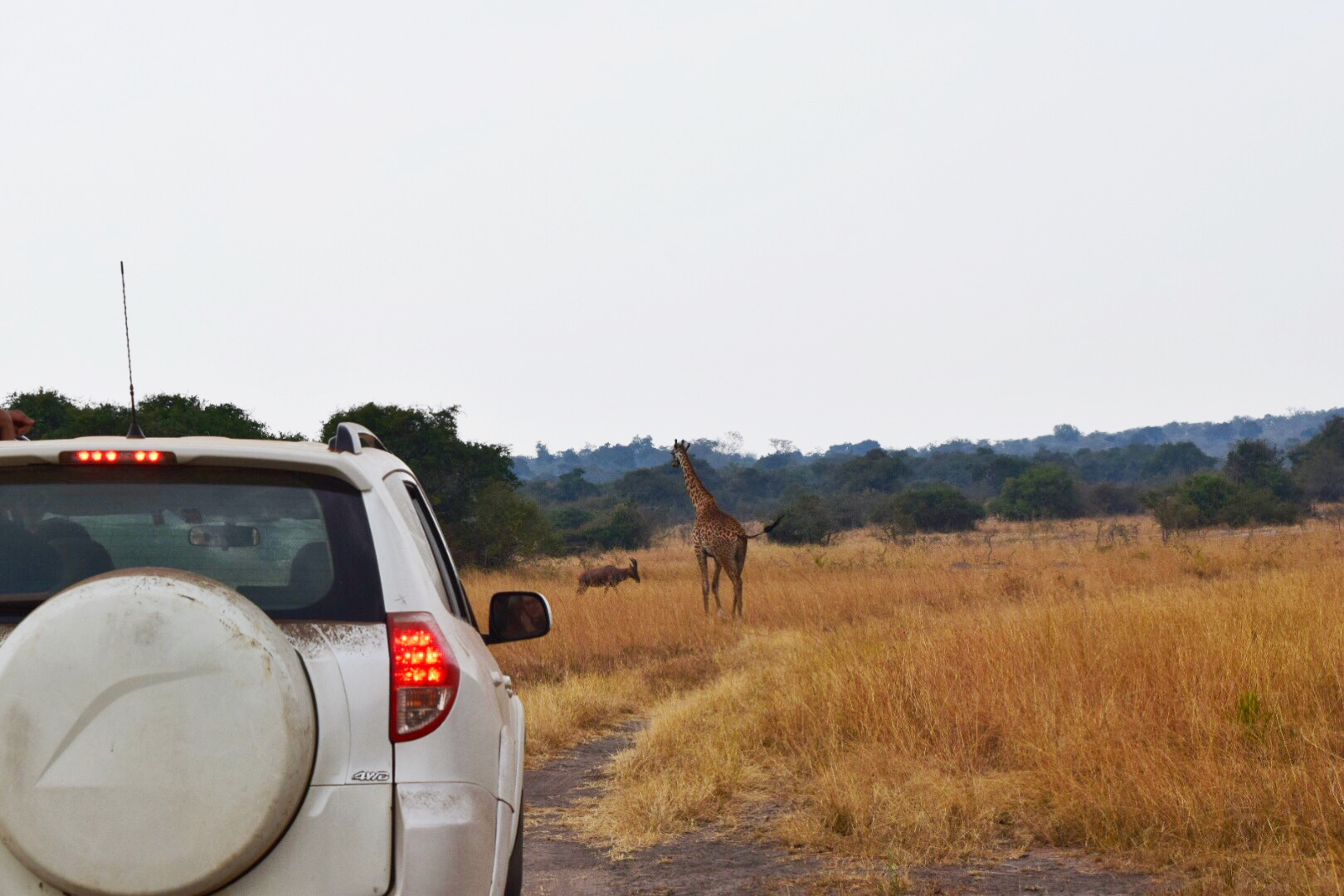
Touring in Akagera National Park

Tour groups are led by guides who specialize in teaching others about the landscape and wildlife of Rwanda. Expeditions visit volcanoes, waterfalls, and rainforests that are home to many African animals.

Rwanda is home to a huge, diverse population of animals, including mountain gorillas, and the world's largest natural park for hippos, where 20,000 are believed to live.

Plastic bags are banned in Rwanda, and tourists are instructed not to bring them to the country.

== Attractions ==
=== Volcanoes National Park ===
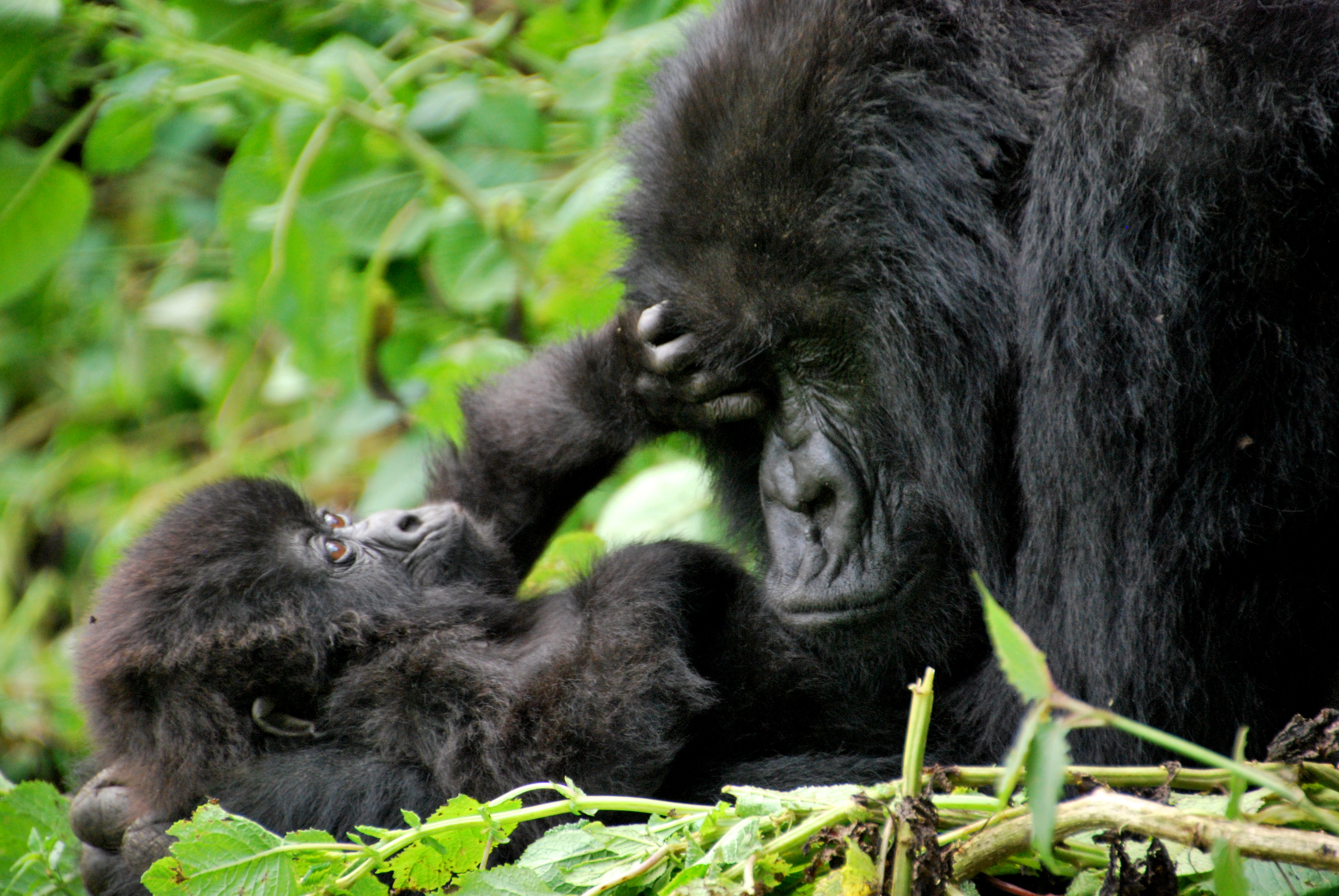
Mother and baby gorilla in Volcanoes National Park

Volcanoes National Park, part of the larger multinational Virunga Conservation Area, is a stop center for all Rwandan gorilla safaris and shelters many mountain gorillas. Being a roughly two-hour drive from the Kigali International Airport makes it the most accessible gorilla national park in the world. Sharing a border with Uganda and the Democratic Republic of the Congo, this national park in Rwanda is home to a growing number of critically endangered mountain gorillas. Experts estimate that there are about 700 gorillas in the park, which is a significant increase from around 240-250 individuals in 1981. Since 2005, there has been a tradition of naming newborn mountain gorillas.

Volcanoes National Park is also a home for golden monkeys, a variety of birds, reptiles, amphibians, and insects among other creatures which together make a complete Rwanda safari package.

Volcanoes National Park is named after the chain of dormant volcanoes making up the Virunga Massif: Bisoke with its verdant crater lake, Sabyinyo, Gahinga, Muhabura, and the highest at 4,507 meters, Karisimbi.

Trekking at Volcanoes National Park typically lasts between four and eight hours, most of which is spent hiking through bamboo forests, meadows, and swampland, eventually leading a visitor to one of the habituated gorilla families.

=== Nyungwe Forest National Park ===
One of the oldest rainforests in Africa, Nyungwe, is rich in biodiversity with a total 1,068 plant species, including 140 orchid species; 322 species of birds including the red-collared babbler; and 75 mammalian species such as the serval, mongoose, congo clawless otter, and leopard. Most tourists come to this rainforest to track chimpanzees, as well as 12 other primate species, including the L'Hoest's monkey endemic to the Albertine Rift.

The park is also home to the only canopy walk in East Africa, roughly a 90-minute hike from the Uwinka Visitor Center. There is a 91-meter long suspension bridge dangling more than 50 meters above the verdant rainforest.

=== Gishwati Forest ===
Gishwati Forest is part of Gishwati-Mukura Forest National Park. The Gishwati Concession is managed by Wilderness Safaris in collaboration with the Forest of Hope Association and Rwanda Development Board. Gishwati Forest was opened to the public on 1 December 2020. Popular activities are chimpanzee tracking, hiking and birding. Other activities include a primate trek to see the blue and L'hoest's monkeys, and a community walk in the nearby villages. The only accommodation in the park is the Forest of Hope Guest House which has two twin rooms and a campsite.

=== Akagera National Park ===
Akagera National Park is a roughly two-and-a-half-hour drive from Kigali. Managed by the African Parks Organization, the park is located in eastern Rwanda with 2,500 km^{2} (970 sq mi) (one of east-central Africa's largest protected wetlands) of mainly Savannah land. It is named after the Kagera River that flows along Rwanda's eastern boundary with Tanzania. The river feeds into Lake Ihema and other smaller lakes in and around the park. The park protects an African savanna landscape of acacia and bush, with patches of open grassland and a dozen swampy lakes.

The park is home to elephants, buffalo, giraffes, zebras, leopards, hyenas, lions, and rhinos. Many species of antelope live here, including bushbucks, topis, oribis, water-bucks, roan antelopes, duikers, klipspringers, impalas, and the world's largest antelope, the cape eland. There are schools of hippos and Nile crocodiles habituating near Lake Ihema. Common primates in Akagera national park are olive baboons, vervet monkeys, blue monkey, and bush babies. Visitors can also see the environment make a shift from savanna plains, to wetlands, and to lakes.

=== Lake Kivu ===
Covering a surface area of 2,700 km^{2} (1,000 sq mi), Lake Kivu is Rwanda's largest lake and the sixth largest in Africa. Steep, terraced hills lead down to the picturesque lake shore and the resort towns of Gisenyi, Kibuye, and Cyangugu. These small towns serve as retreats from the sometimes strenuous hikes to find gorillas and chimpanzees in the surrounding Volcanoes and Nyungwe Forest National Parks. Lake Kivu has a lively waterfront of sandy beaches mixed with resorts. Lake Kivu is also known as one of the safest lakes in Africa, and there are no dangerous animals such as hippos or crocodiles.

The lake has hundreds of islands. The most known island in Lake Kivu is Napoleon Island outside Karongi, which is a conservation area and home to one of Africa's largest colonies of straw colored fruit bats. The most common way to explore Lake Kivu is through one of the standard tour boats with benches and a roof.

=== Congo Nile Trail ===
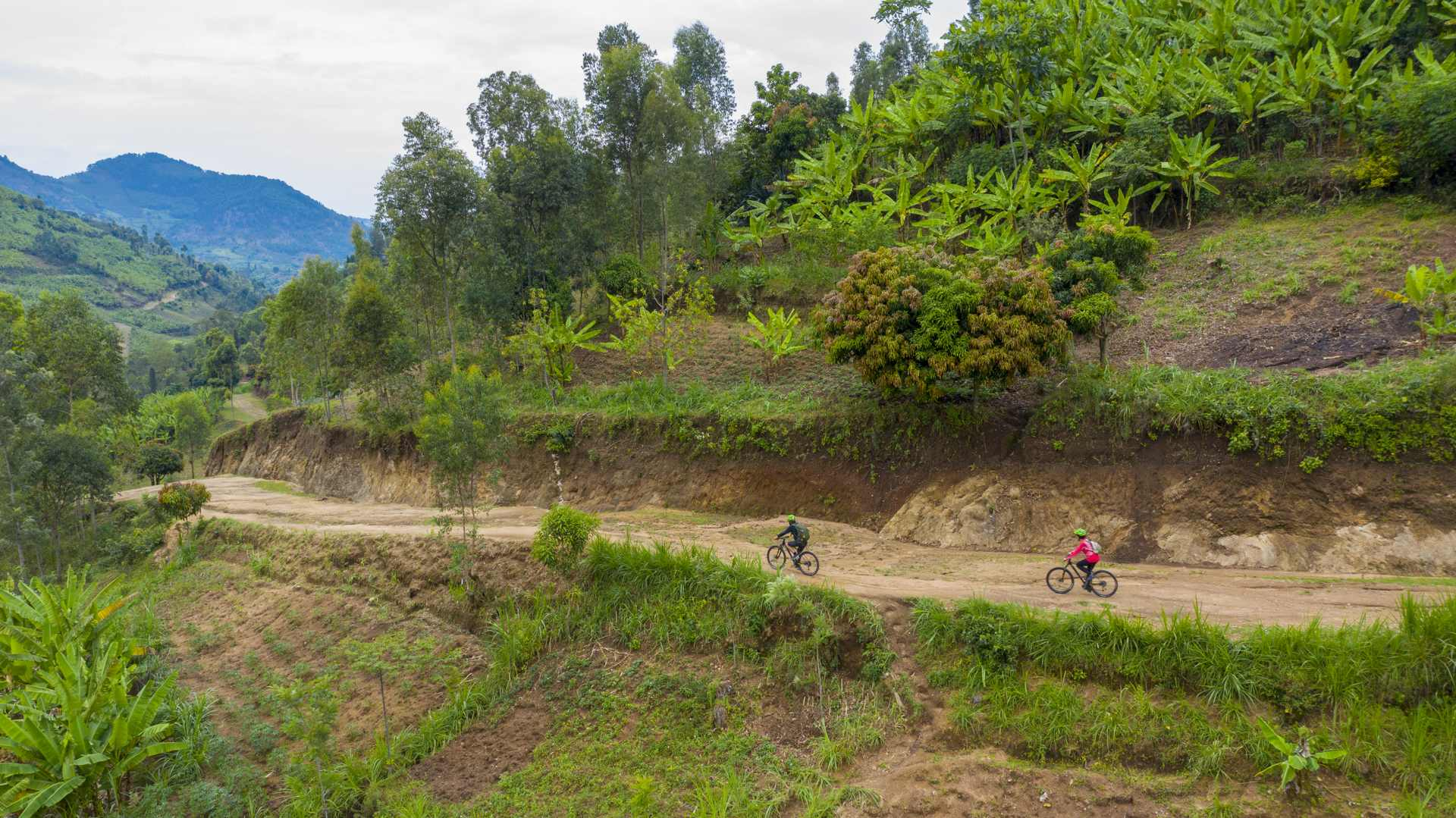
Biking on the Congo Nile Trail close to Kinunu

The Congo Nile Trail is a hiking and mountain biking trail along the Congo Nile Divide between Rusizi and Rubavu. The trail has eight biking stages and 10 hiking stages. Each stage takes one day to complete and there is food and accommodation at the end of each stage. The trail passes through the scenery of Lake Kivu and the green Rwandan hills. It passes through five districts, Rubavu, Rutsiro, Karongi, Nyamasheke and Rusizi. The Congo Nile Trail also passes by two of Rwanda's five national parks: Nyungwe Forest National Park and Gishwati-Mukura Forest National Park.

=== King's Palace Museum ===
The star attraction at King's Palace Museum, one of Rwanda's eight national museums, is the sacred Inyambo cows with staggeringly large horns. Throughout the day, traditional singers lull the cows into a mellow state by belting poems, which is a ritual unique to Rwanda.

The museum showcases a replica of a king's palace from the 15th century with a thatched roof, royal hut, and a fresh milk hut traditionally run by an unmarried woman.

The museum contains the colonial-style home that was once the royal residence of King Mutara III Rudahigwa in the mid 20th century. The interior design strikingly blends Rwandan patterns with European-style furniture (some of which were actually owned by the king).

=== Ethnographic Museum ===
One of Africa's best collections of ethnological and archaeological artifacts can be found in Rwanda's Ethnographic Museum, located about 130 kilometers south of Kigali in the Huye District. Belgium gifted the museum to the city in 1989 in honor of the 25th anniversary of Rwandan independence.

The museum's seven galleries take visitors back in time to pre-colonial Rwanda. The galleries hold a collection of woven baskets, traditional garments made from animal hides, woven grass spears and bows, musical drums from hundreds of years ago, and old farming tools.

The museum also hosts live handicraft demonstrations.

=== Kigali Genocide Memorial ===
Inaugurated on the 10th anniversary of the Rwandan Genocide, the Kigali Genocide Memorial at Gisozi is where 250,000 victims were buried. This memorial serves to educate how the genocide against the Tutsi took shape, and it also examines other genocides that took place during the 20th century.

The wall of names is dedicated to those who died, though many of the victims of the genocide are unknown and names have yet to be found, so it is a work in progress.

The memorial gardens provide a place for quiet contemplation about the history of the genocide against the Tutsi. While the largest memorial is in Kigali, the genocide touched all corners of Rwanda, and as such there are many emotionally charged memorials located throughout the country. Some areas are simple as a quiet garden space for contemplation, while others are larger and hold relics, remains, and exhibits on the genocide itself.

== See also ==
- Kandt House Museum
