= Rwanda: The Royal Tour =

Rwanda: The Royal Tour is 2018 PBS documentary directed by John Feist. Aimed to promote tourism in Rwanda, it features Peter Greenberg as he tours Rwanda and is taken around Rwanda’s president Paul Kagame as his tourist guide.

== Synopsis ==
The film shows President Kagame taking American journalist Peter Greenberg on safari to see the Big Five, Volcanoes National Park, Akagera National Park, mountain gorillas, and the transformation of Rwanda.

In what appears to be an unusual appearance of Kagame, he walks barefoot as he is leading Peter to go jet skiing and also invites Greenberg to his presidential home for a round of tennis.

== Screening ==
The film premiered in Chicago, with Paul Kagame in attendance, then later screened in New York before being screened in Kigali.
