= Mutara =

Mutara may refer to:

- Mutara I of Rwanda, King of Rwanda, 1624–1648
- Mutara II Rwogera (1802 – 1853), King of Rwanda, 1830–1853
- Mutara III Rudahigwa (1912 – 1959), King of Rwanda, 1931–1959
- Mutara, a protected area in Rwanda
- Mutara Nebula, fictional nebula in Star Trek

== See also ==
- Umutara, a former province of Rwanda
