= Gishwati Forest =

Forest near Lake Kivu, Rwanda

Gishwati-Mukura National Park
- IUCN category IV (habitat/species management area)
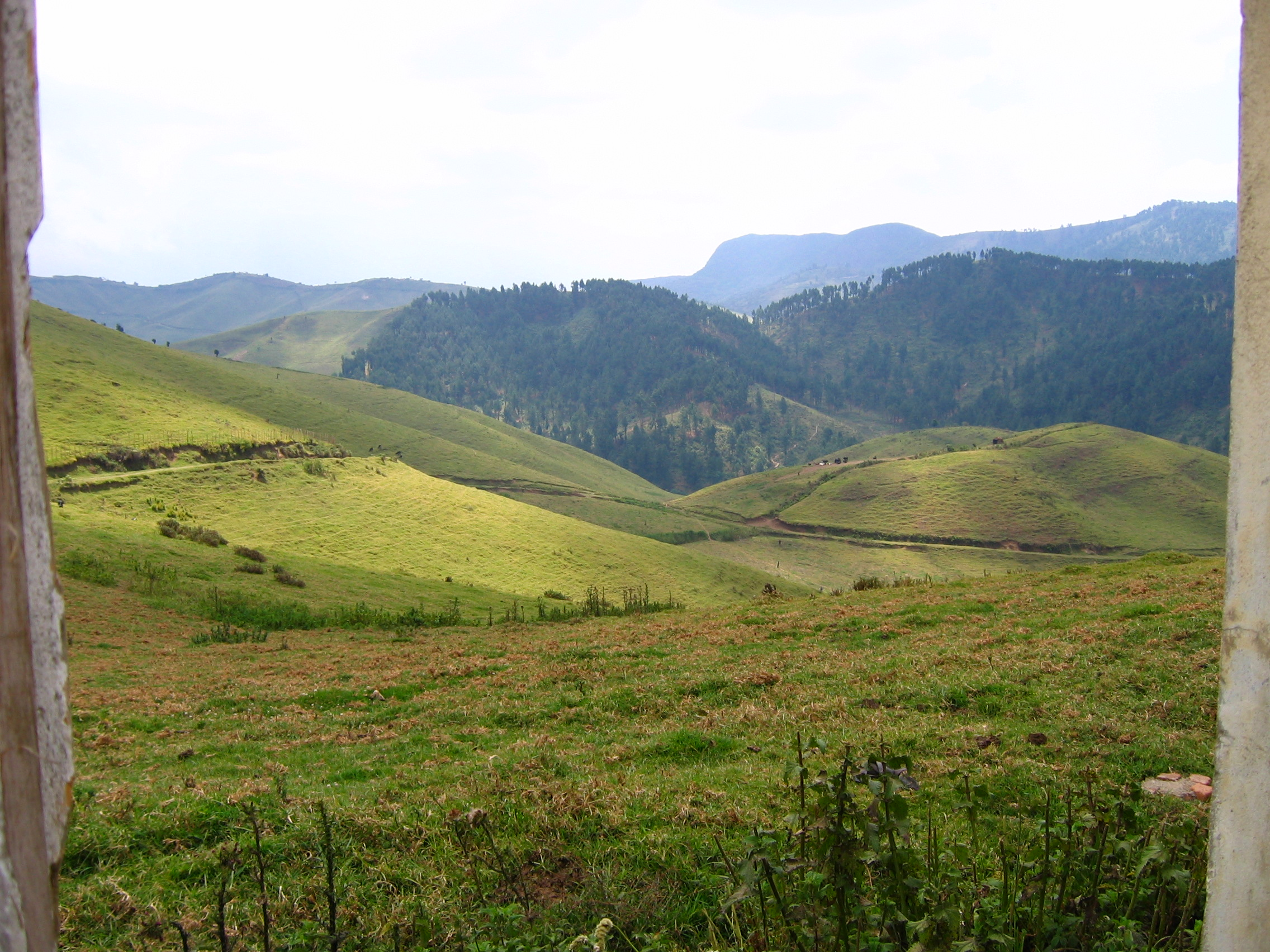
- The Hills of Gishwati, 2004

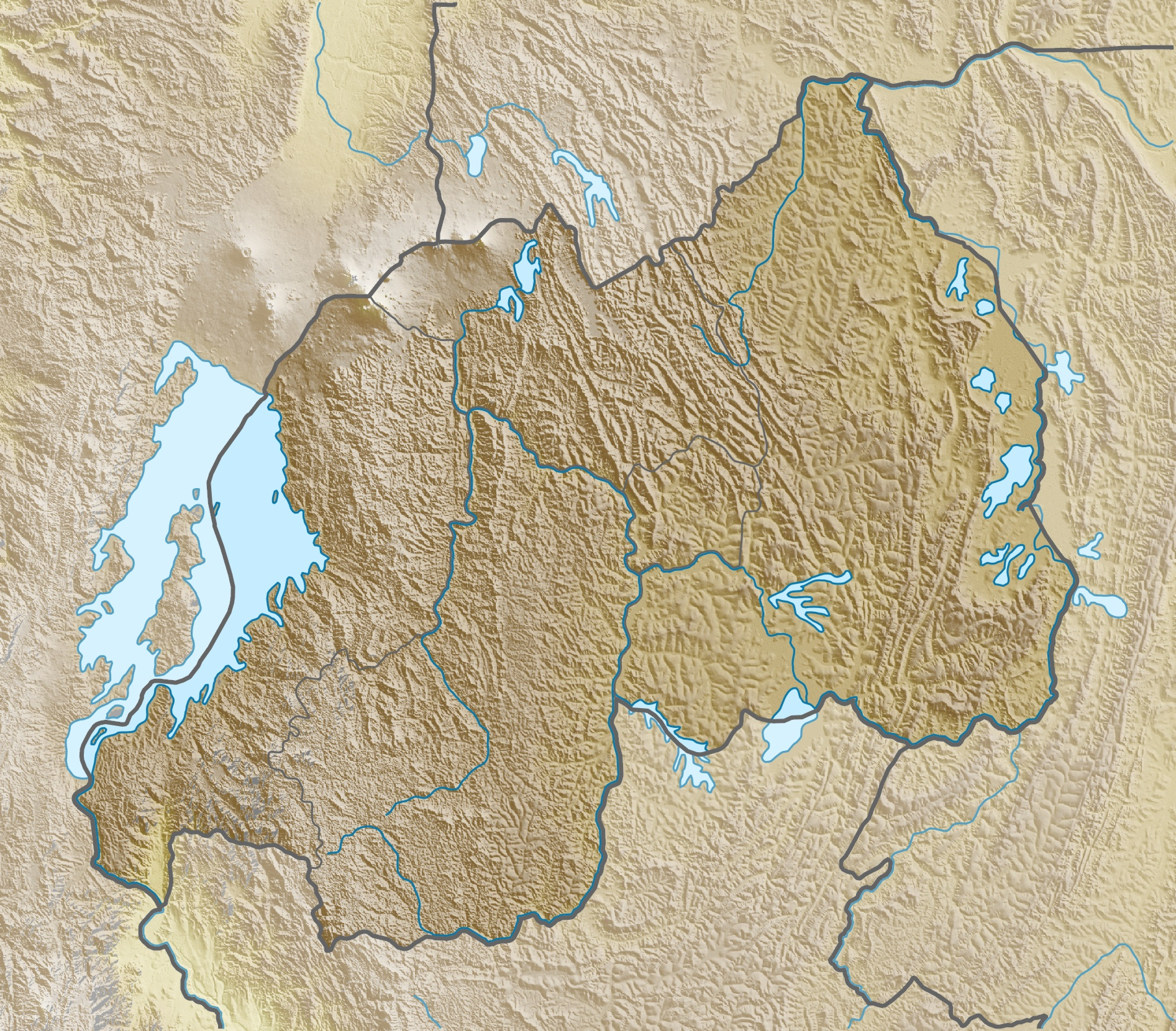
- Location within Rwanda
- Location: Western Province, Rwanda
- Coordinates: 1°44′50″S 29°25′37.3″E
- Area: 32.02 km^{2} (12.36 sq mi)
- Designation: National park
- Designated: 2015
- Governing body: Rwanda Development Board

Gishwati Forest is a forest in the north-western part of Rwanda, not far from Lake Kivu. It is part of Gishwati–Mukura National Park. The area's forests were largely intact in 1978, and substantial forest cover still remained in 1986. During the Rwandan genocide, wave after wave of refugees arrived in Gishwati Forest and began clearing it, often for subsistence farming. By 2001, only a small circular patch of native forest remained, 1,500 acres (6.1 km^{2}) of the forest's original 250,000. In addition to tremendous loss of biodiversity, the region experiences soil erosion and degradation and landslides. Reforestation efforts in the past few years have increased the remnant native forest to about 2,500 acres (10 km^{2}). Large tea estates occupy the central and northern parts of the reserve.

== History ==
The Gishwati Forest used to be one piece in a complex system of rainforests through the middle of Africa. It used to extend west beyond Lake Kivu connecting with the rainforests of the Congo, and south connecting with Nyungwe Forest. These forest systems have become fragmented due to population increase and deforestation. The Rwandan genocide put strain on the site as refugees fled and the population increased as people were displaced from their homes; however the area had faced years of degradation prior to the Rwandan genocide. The area was degraded for cattle ranching and agriculture until it became unproductive. Erosion, landslides, reduced water quality, and soil infertility had resulted from this degradation of the land.

The Gishwati Area Conservation Program (GACP) began in 2007 with the collaboration of Rwandan president, Paul Kagame, and Great Ape Trust, founded by philanthropist Ted Townsend. The initiative began with the idea of creating a national conservation park in Rwanda to protect the biodiversity of the Gishwati Forest area and stop some of the rapid degradation. In 1930 the Gishwati Forest covered 70,000 acres but lost about 90 percent of its cover, this initiative aimed to restore the dramatic loss the area has seen over the last decade and therefore named the site the Forest of Hope. In 2011, the GACP was succeeded by a Rwandan non-governmental organization known as the Forest of Hope Association, which is currently managing the Gishwati Forest Reserve (GFR).

Since the Forest of Hope has been in place there has been a 67 percent increase in size of the Gishwati Forest. The local chimpanzee population has grown and many research and conservation initiatives have been employed within the reserve. The Gishwati Area Conservation Program began with the hopes that down the road the Rwandan government would take over the area make it a national park. The forest was designated part of Gishwati-Mukura National Park in 2015.

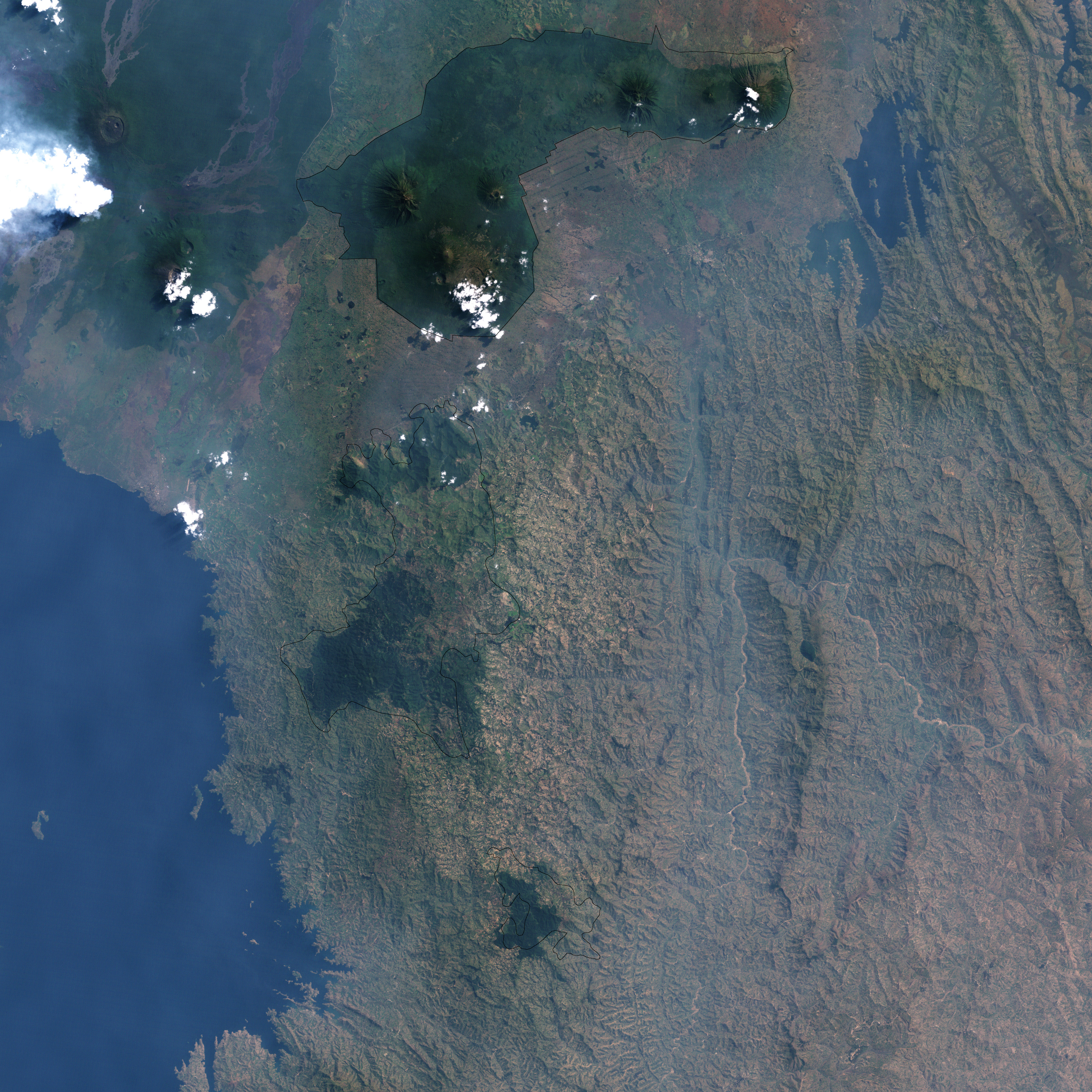
Gishwati Forest 1986.

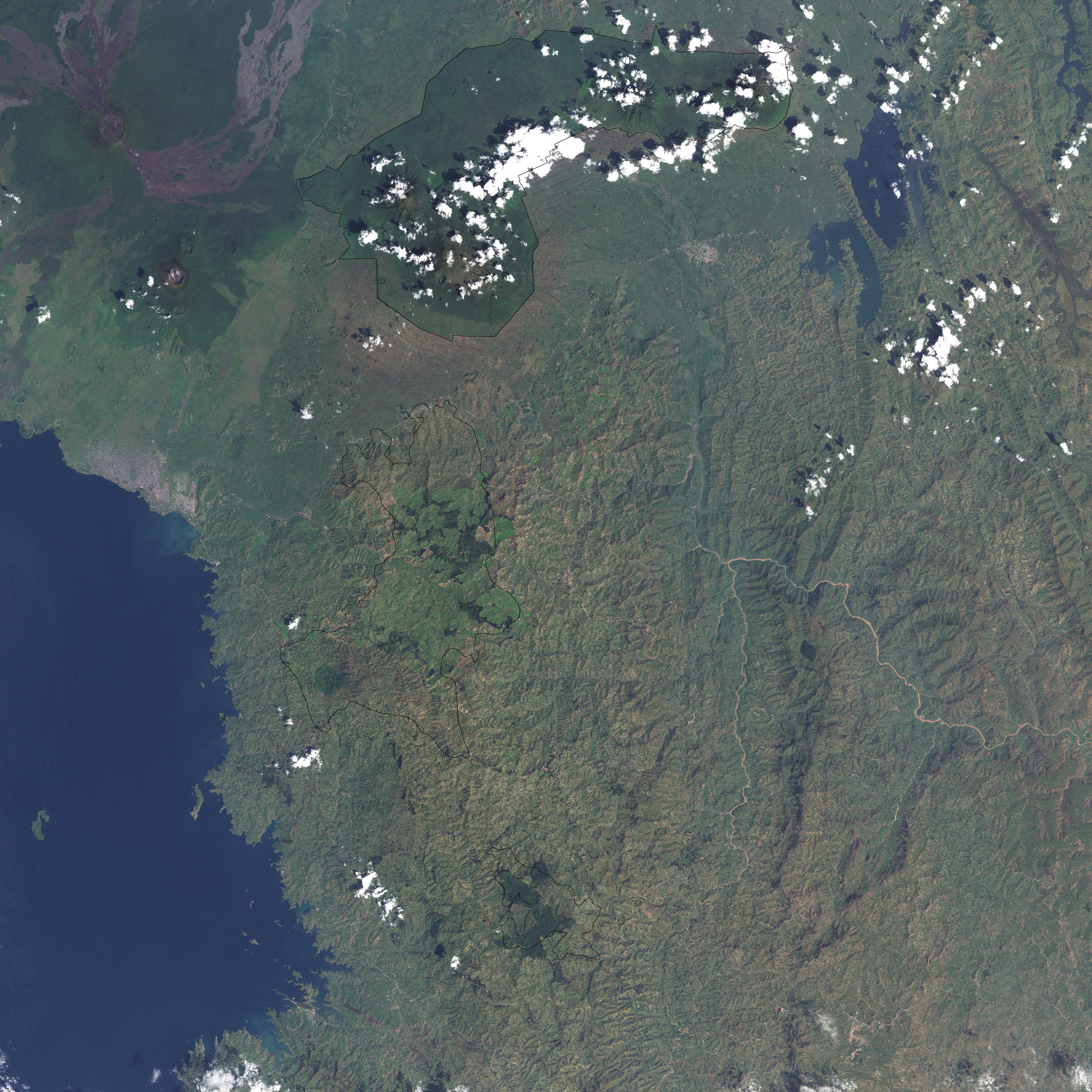
Gishwati Forest 2001.

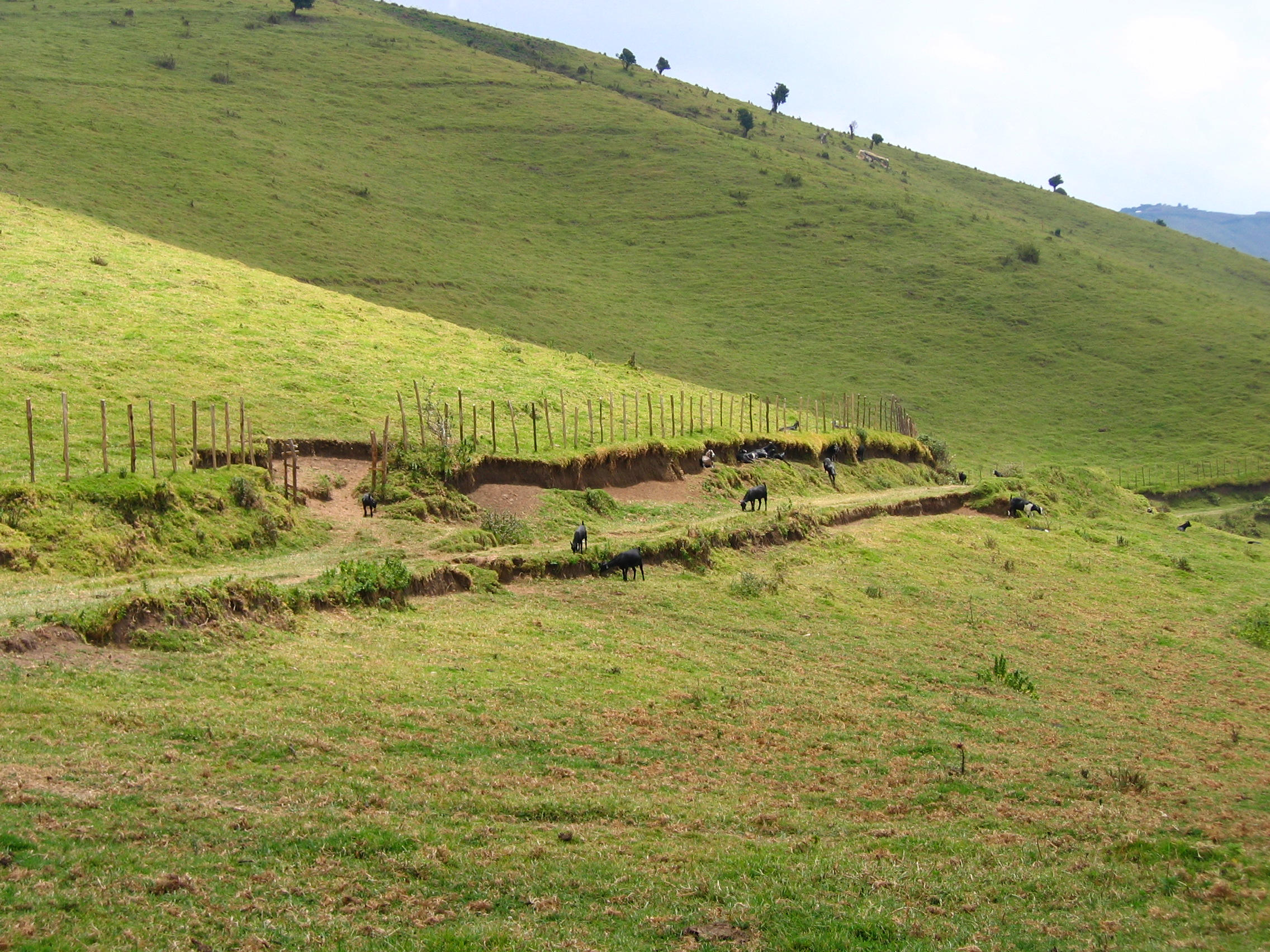
Cattle and erosion in the leftovers of Gishwati, 2004.

== Biodiversity ==
The deforestation of the Gishwati Forest has resulted in serious loss of biodiversity. Fauna alone has declined by 99.7%. Flora that play an important role in the lives of the native people have also seen significant decline. Wild fruits have declined by 93.3%, wild vegetables have declined by 99.6%, and wild medicines used by the native people have declined by 79.9%.

The forest reserve has recorded 58 species of trees and shrubs, including numerous indigenous hardwoods and bamboo. A recent study of carbon sequestration of the forest indicated Macaranga kilimandscharica to be the most common species of tree in areas of the forest that have not been disturbed. Previously disturbed regions of the forest experiencing regeneration show colonization of Carapa grandiflora, Entandrophragma excelsum, and Symphonia globulifera. Other flora of the reserve include giant tree ferns and blue lichen.

A wide range of fauna can be found within the reserve. Four species of primates are found, the Eastern Chimpanzee (Pan troglodytes schweinfurtii), the golden monkey, the blue monkey, and the L'Hoest's monkey (also known as mountain monkey). Though not since 2002, a fifth species of primate, the black and white colobus. has been reported having been seen. There are currently estimated to be 20 East African chimpanzees in the forest. This is a 54% increase in population size from the 13 chimps in 2008, when the GACP first started. This includes five infants. The average density of chimpanzee nests was found to be 1.473 per km2 by Dr. Plumptree. Other mammals include the red river hog (Potamochoerus porcus), black-fronted duiker (Cephalophus nigrifrons), southern tree hyrax (Dendrohyrax arboreus), serval (Leptailurus serval), and African golden cat (Caracal aurata).

Other fauna found are the 84 species of birds, including the white-headed wood hoopoe (Phoeniculus bollei) and mountain yellow warbler (Iduna similis). The brown forest frog along with multiple species of toads are some of the amphibian life found in the forest. With respect to reptiles, the great lakes bush viper and multiple species of chameleons are also found live in the Gishwati Forest.

In 2020, Gishwati-Mukura National Park was designated a World Biosphere Reserve at the 32nd session of the International Coordinating Council of UNESCO's Man and the Biosphere (MAB) Programme.

== Tourism ==
In 2019, Gishwati Forest formally became part of the Gishwati-Mukura Forest National Park. The national park has two concessions. Gishwati Forest and Mukura Forest. Gishwati Forest Concession is managed by three parts, Rwanda Development Board, Wilderness Safaris and Forest of Hope. Rwanda Development Board oversees all national parks in Rwanda. Wilderness Safaris will manage tourism activities in Gishwati Forest and Forest of hope are managing the reforestation and conservation of Gishwati Forest. Mukura Forest remains closed for visitors, while Gishwati Forest opened the doors to visitors on the 1st of December 2020. The main tourist activity in Gishwati Forest is chimpanzee tracking, but there are also a number of near endemic bird species to see as well as Golden Monkeys, serval cats and other animals. The Forest of Hope Guest House opened its doors to the public in 2020 It is a requirement that you stay in the guest house in order to visit Gishwati Forest National Park. The guest house has 2 twin en-suite rooms and a camp site. The restaurant offers breakfast, lunch and dinner to guests. The guest house is located on top of a hill with views over the forest. Since Gishwati Forest is a national park since 2019 all visitors need to be accompanied by a guide during all activities. Guides are supplied by Rwanda Development Board, while local animal trackers come from nearby villages. Official permits need to be bought to visit the park. As of 2021, a chimpanzee tracking permit is US$100. All permits and guides can be organized through the park office or the Forest of Hope Guest House. If you are travelling with a tour operator, this will be organized for you and included in the price.

Chimpanzee tracking can be done in Gishwati Forest. This activity starts early in the morning and requires that you stay at the Forest of Hope Guest House. There are now around 30 chimpanzees in Gishwati Forest. These chimpanzees are not habituated to humans making chimpanzee tracking a bit more difficult that in Nyungwe or Cyamudongo Forest. There are three hiking trails in Gishwati Forest. Umushwati Trail passes right through the forest and is 8 km long. Waterfall trail starts close to the Forest of Hope Guest House and is 7 km long. Matyazo hill trail is 3 km long up to the highest point in the park at 2469 m and can be combined with Umushwati Trail.

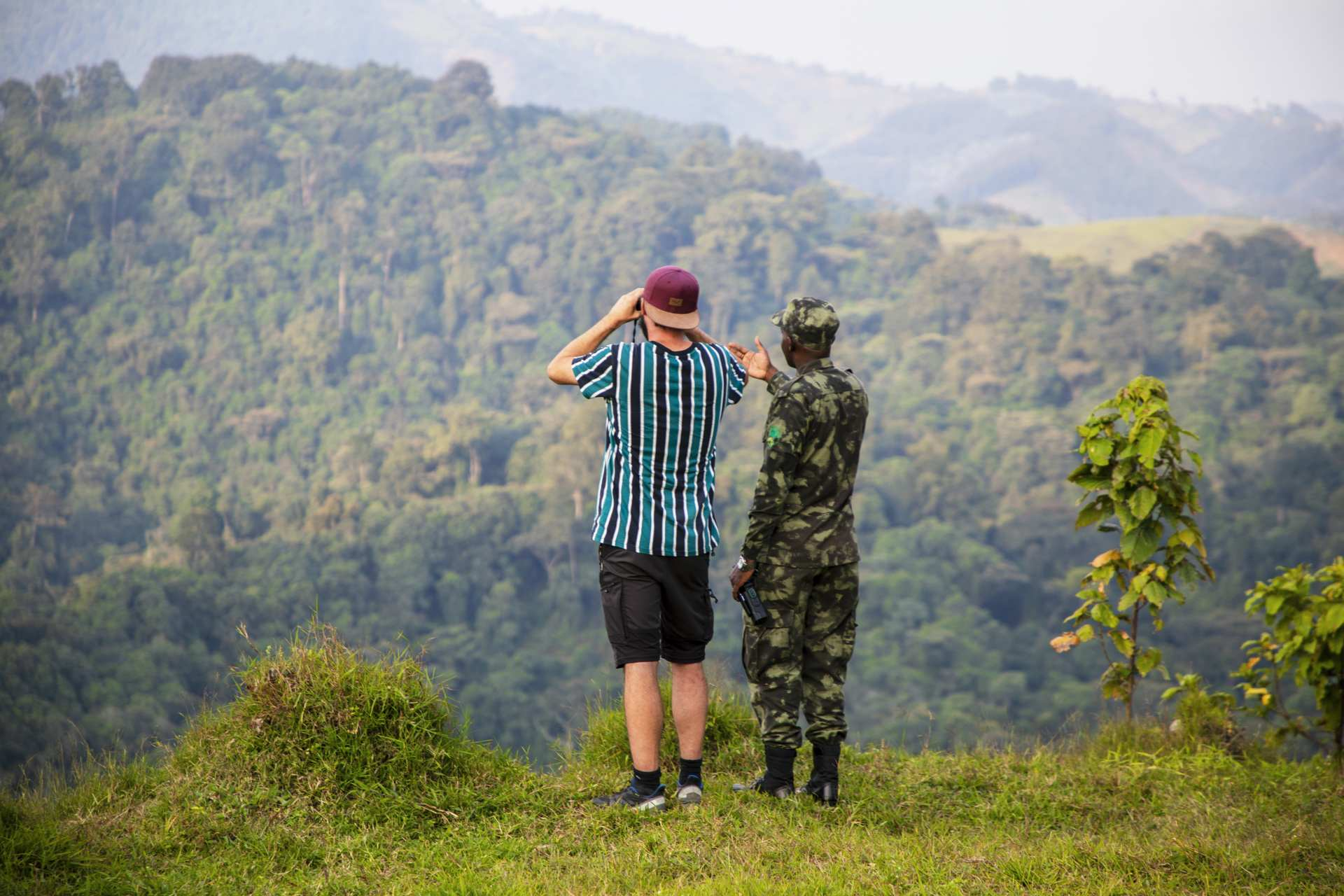
View over Gishwati Forest with a guide

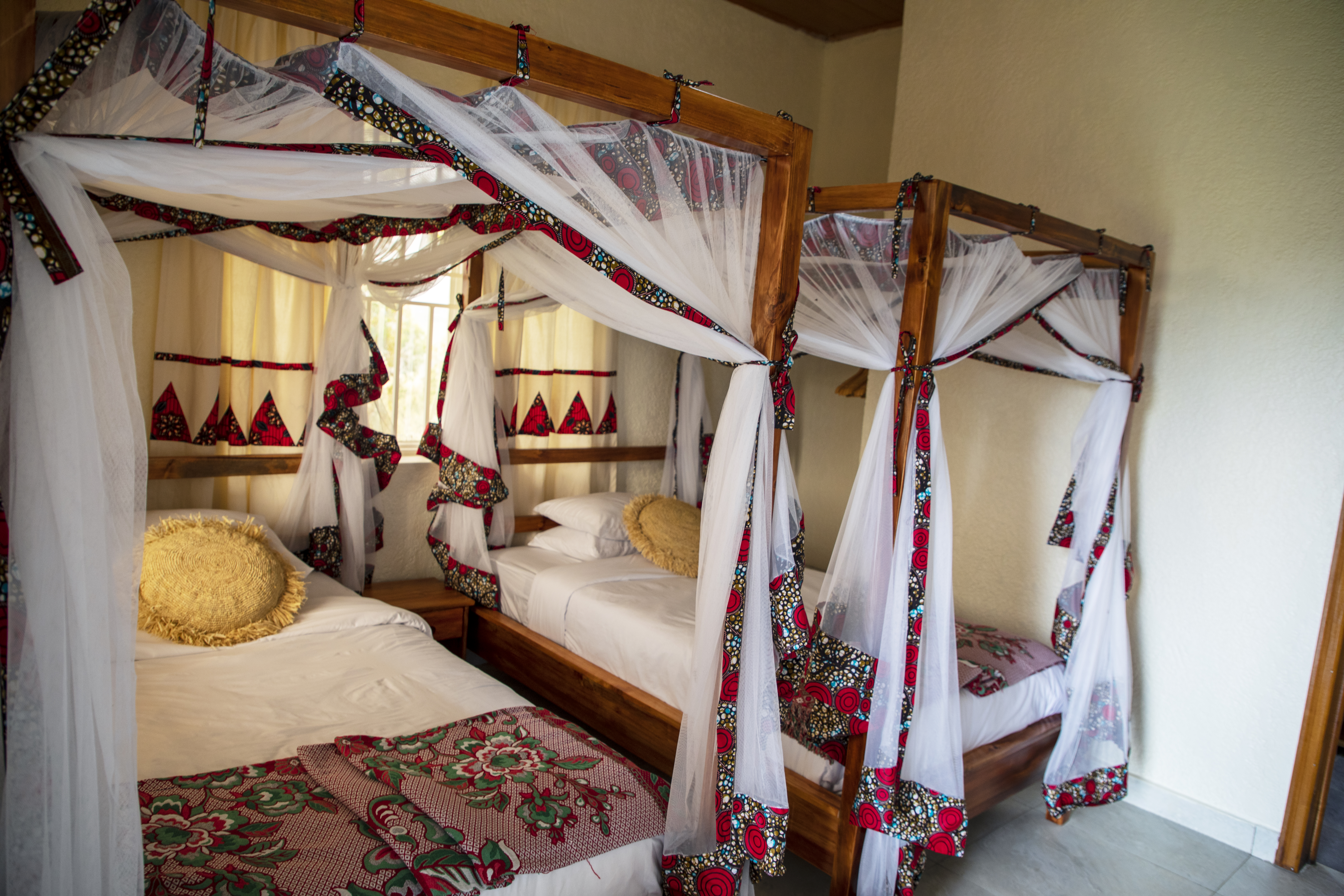
Twin room at the Forest of Hope Guest House

== Conservation ==
A small isolated group of east African chimpanzees inhabits the Gishwati Forest, a place that may serve as a test bed for new conservation approaches and ideas. By 2008 the population had been reduced to thirteen members and was on the brink of extinction. Between 2008 and 2011 the population increased by forty-six percent to nineteen members through the efforts of Rwandan government and the Gishwati Area Conservation Program. Efforts like those established to help Gishwati's great apes may be instrumental in helping great apes around the world. Gishwati forest is the livelihood of hundreds of thousands of Rwandans who live around Gishwati. The forest helps maintain the topsoil's fertility and keeps it from eroding away. In the future it may provide the Rwandan economy with profits from ecotourism through the biodiversity found in the area.

=== Plant-It 2020 ===
In 2011, Plant-It 2020 provided funding for the Gishwati Area Conservation Program of the Great Ape Trust to plant 1,000 native trees in and around Gishwati-Mukura National Park. Plant-It 2020 is a nonprofit international reforestation foundation that was founded by the late singer John Denver.

=== Gishwati Forest and Nyungwe National Park corridor ===
A 10,000 acre corridor of newly planted trees may one day connect Gishwati Forest and Nyungwe National Park, about thirty miles to the south. This connection will allow animals to migrate between the protected areas and insure the gene flow of alleles between both populations of chimpanzees. The project has received government support from Rwandan Ministry of Lands and Environment because the new forest cover will improve water catchment and water purification, prevent soil erosion, replenish soil fertility, and support ecotourism.

== Reforestation ==
In December 2020, Gishwati sector in partnership with Wilderness Safaris Rwanda (WSR) and Forest of Hope Association had developed a nursery of 10,000 indigenous trees near the park which planted on 10 hectares of Gishwati-Mukura National Park by the end of 2020. Gishwati has reduced in size by 98% since 1970s this resulted in environmental degradation, loss of biodiversity, erosion and land slide. Rob Baas (WSR managing Director) said that to be able to give back the forest they had to plant native plants and assist protection of its animals.
