= Mutara Game Reserve =

Mutara Game Reserve (also known as Mutara Hunting Reserve or Mutara Hunting Fields) is a former protected area in Rwanda. Large parts of the reserve kept getting stripped of their protected status, until Matura reserve's status was entirely withdrawn in 1997. Originally covering some 855 km^{2} (330 sq mi), it was later reduced to 612 km^{2} (236 sq mi). In 1991, it was further reduced to 300 km^{2} (120 sq mi) to accommodate cattle grazing for refugees from the Rwandan Civil War, before being completely de-listed in 1997.

== See also ==
- Akagera National Park, an adjacent park that was similarly reduced in size, though not entirely de-listed
