= Nyungwe Forest =

UNESCO World Heritage Site in Rwanda

Nyungwe National Park
- Nyungwe Forest National Park
- IUCN category IV (habitat/species management area)
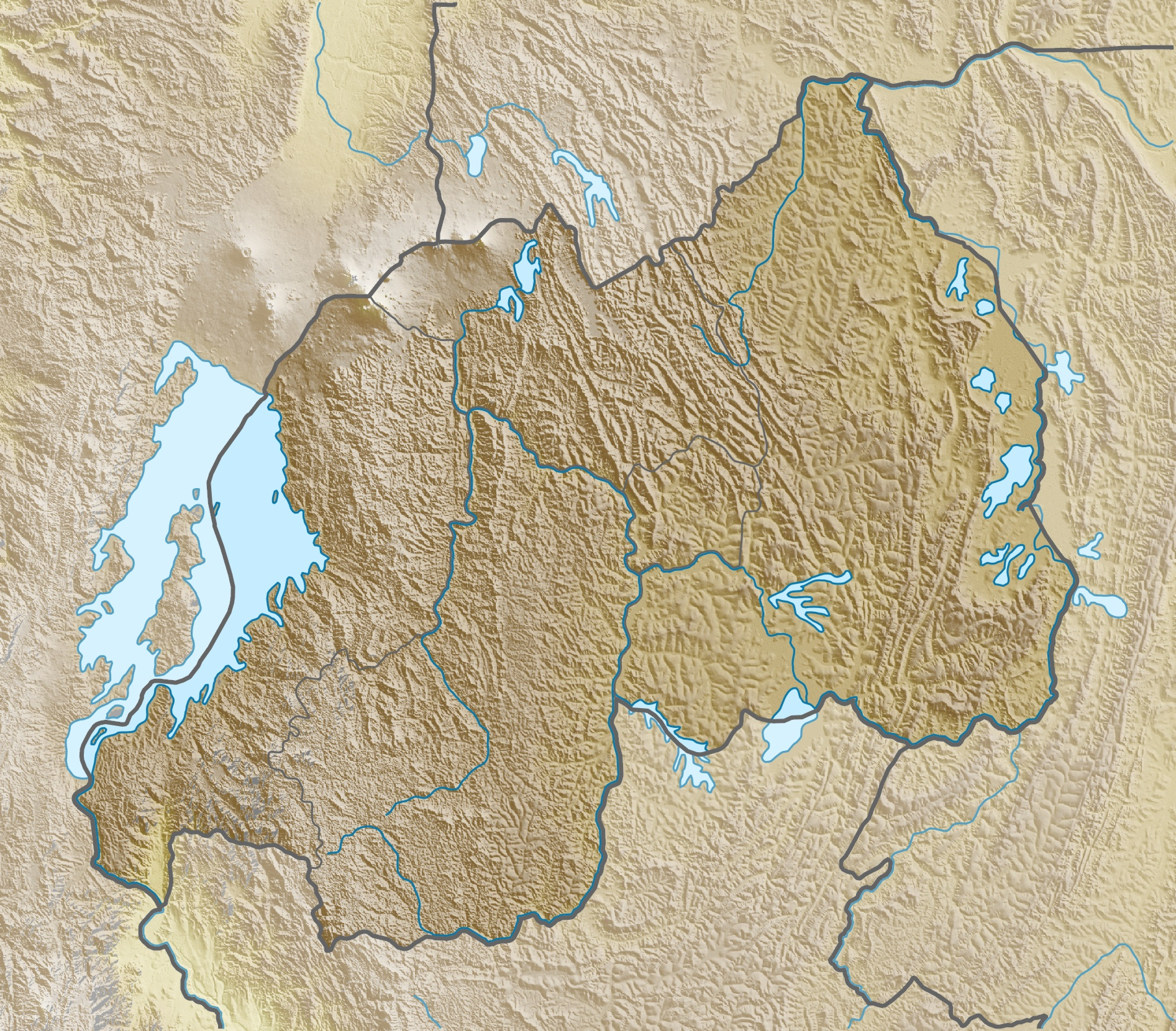
- Location within Rwanda
- Location: Western and Southern provinces, Rwanda
- Coordinates: 2°29′24″S 29°17′34″E
- Area: 1,019 km^{2} (393 sq mi)
- Designation: National park
- Designated: 1933 (forest reserve), 2005 (national park)

UNESCO World Heritage Site
- Criteria: Natural: x
- Reference: 1697
- Inscription: 2023 (45th Session)

The Nyungwe Forest(/njʊŋɡweɪ/) is located in southwestern Rwanda, on the border with Burundi, where it is contiguous with the Kibira National Park to the south, and Lake Kivu and the Democratic Republic of the Congo to the west. The Nyungwe rainforest is most likely the best preserved montane rainforest in Africa. It is located in the watershed between the basin of the Congo River to the west and the basin of the river Nile to the east. From the east side of the Nyungwe forest comes also one of the branches of the Nile sources.

Nyungwe Forest was established in 2004 and covers an area of approximately 1,019 km^{2} (393 sq mi) of rainforest, bamboo, grassland, swamps, and bogs. The nearest town is Kamembe, Rwanda, 54 km (34 mi) to the west. Mount Bigugu (2,921 m (9,583 ft)) is located within the park borders. In October 2020, the Rwanda Development Board signed an agreement with African Parks to assume management for an initial 20 years. In September 2023, Nyungwe Forest was added to UNESCO World Heritage list.

== Wildlife ==
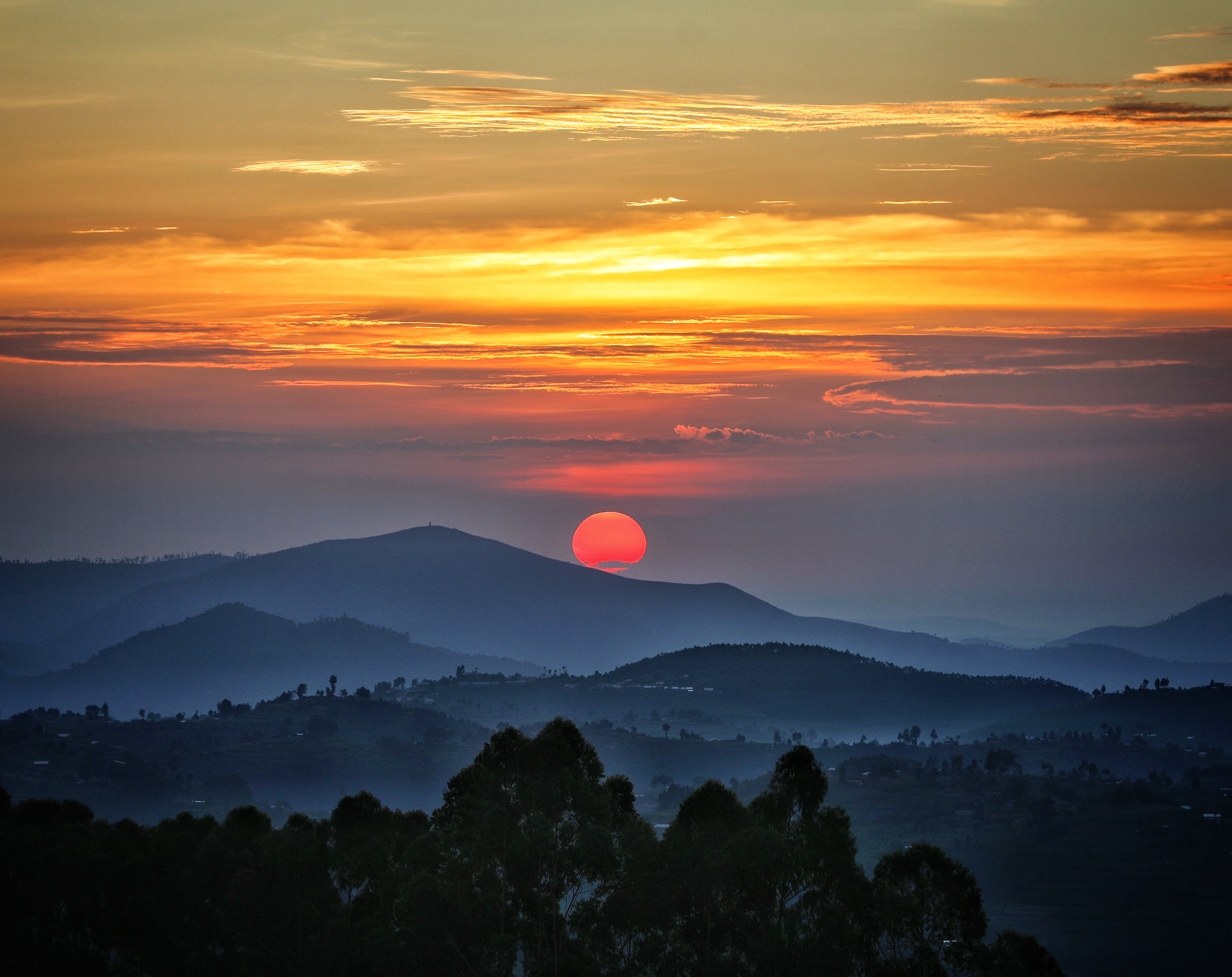
Sunrise in Nyungwe

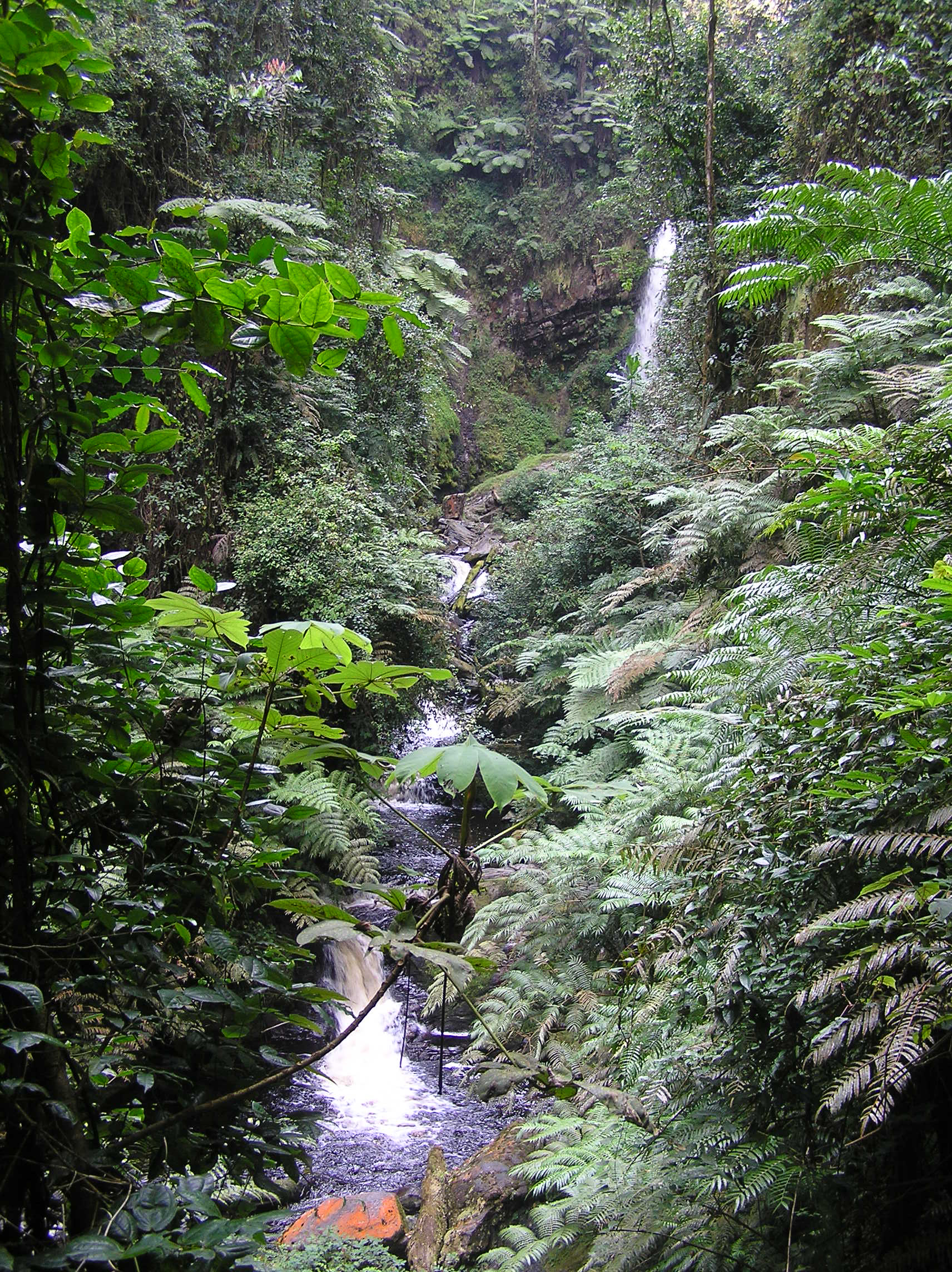
River in Nyungwe Park, Rwanda

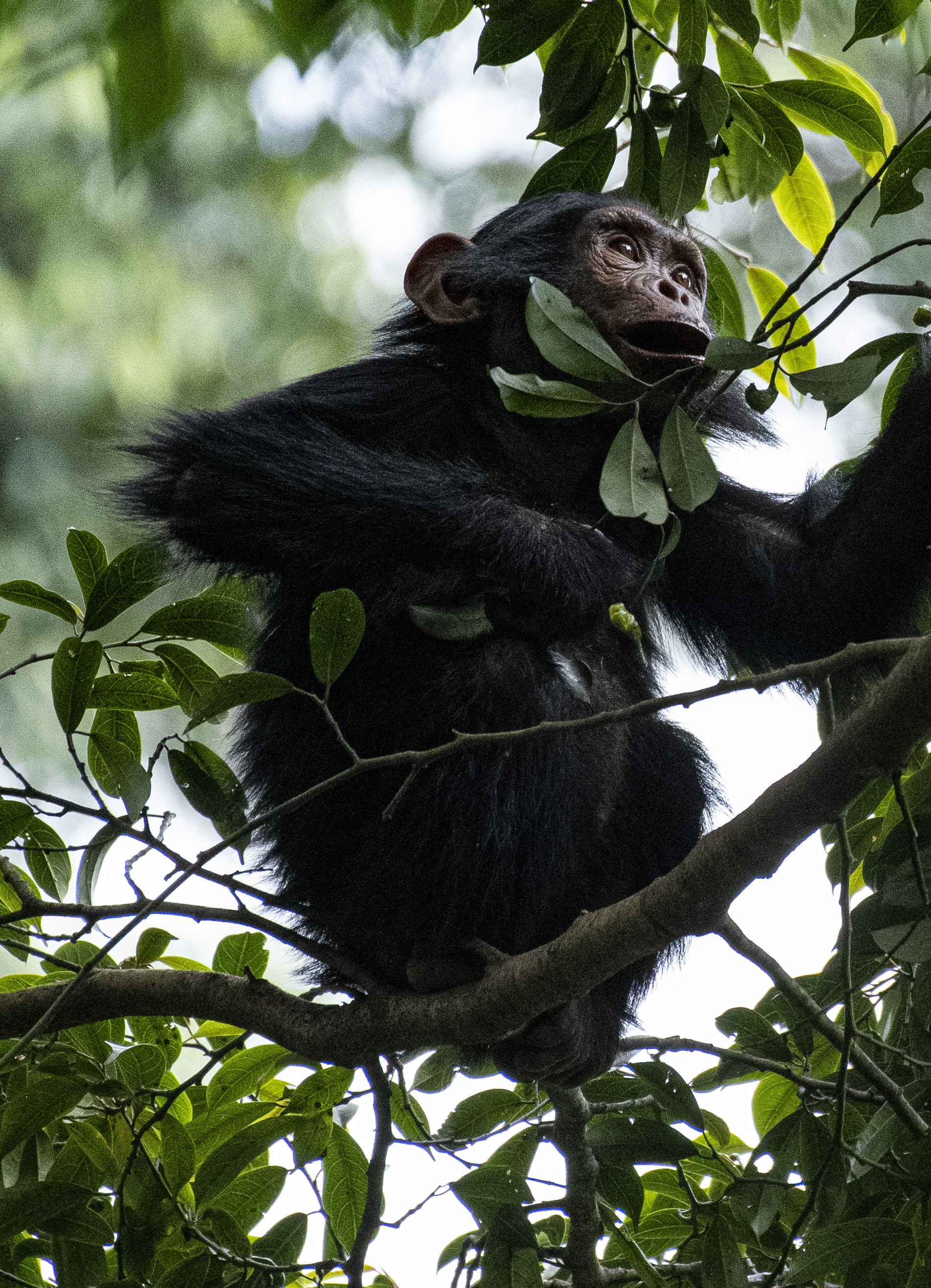
Young chimpanzee in Nyungwe Forest National Park, Rwanda

The Nyungwe forest has a wide diversity of animal species, making it a priority for conservation in Africa. The forest is situated in a region in which several large-scale biogeographical zones meet and the variety of terrestrial biomes provides a great span of microhabitats for many different species of plants and animals.

The park contains 13 primate species (25% of Africa's total), more than 300 bird species including 30 Albertine Rift endemics, 1068 plant species, 85 mammal species, 32 amphibian and 38 reptile species. Many of these animals are restricted-range species that are only found in the Albertine Rift montane forests ecoregion in Africa. In fact, the number of endemic species found here is greater than in any other forest in the Albertine Rift Mountains that has been surveyed. The forest, which reaches its maximum altitude of 3,000 m (9,800 ft), is of particular interest for the presence of colonies of chimpanzees (Pan troglodytes) and Angola colobus (Colobus angolensis), the latter now extinct in Angola for the intense hunt to which they were subjected.

=== Primate species ===
- Common chimpanzee (Pan troglodytes)
- Ruwenzori colobus (Colobus angolensis ruwenzori)
- L'Hoest's monkey (Cercopithecus l'hoesti)
- Silver monkey (Cercopithecus doggetti)
- Golden monkey (Cercopithecus kandti)
- Hamlyn's monkey (Cercopithecus hamlyni)
- Red-tailed monkey (Cercopithecus ascanius)
- Dent's mona monkey (Cercopithecus denti)
- Vervet monkey (Chlorocebus pygerythrus)
- Olive baboon (Papio anubis)
- Grey-cheeked mangabey (Lophocebus albigena)

== History ==
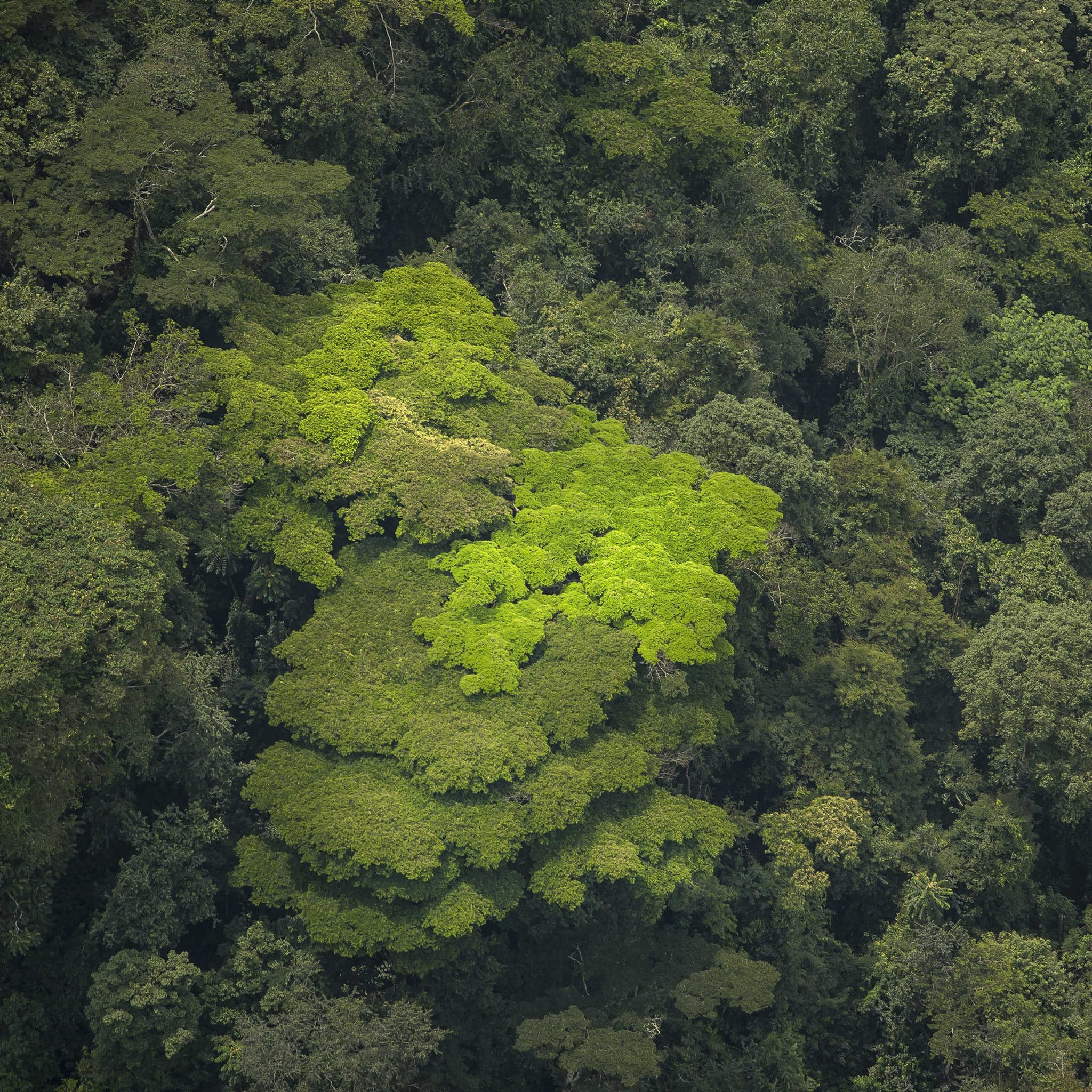
Aerial view of the forest

Nyungwe Forest Reserve was established in 1933 by the Belgian colonial government. In the 1920s the colonial government had become concerned about the accelerating conversion of forest to pasture. The laws governing Rwanda's forest reserves prohibited clearing forests for agriculture, but maintained community rights to cut and collect firewood, and permitted commercial exploitation of valuable hardwood timber. Enforcement was lax, and local people continued to use the forest for hunting, honey collection, woodcutting, subsistence farming, and gold mining.

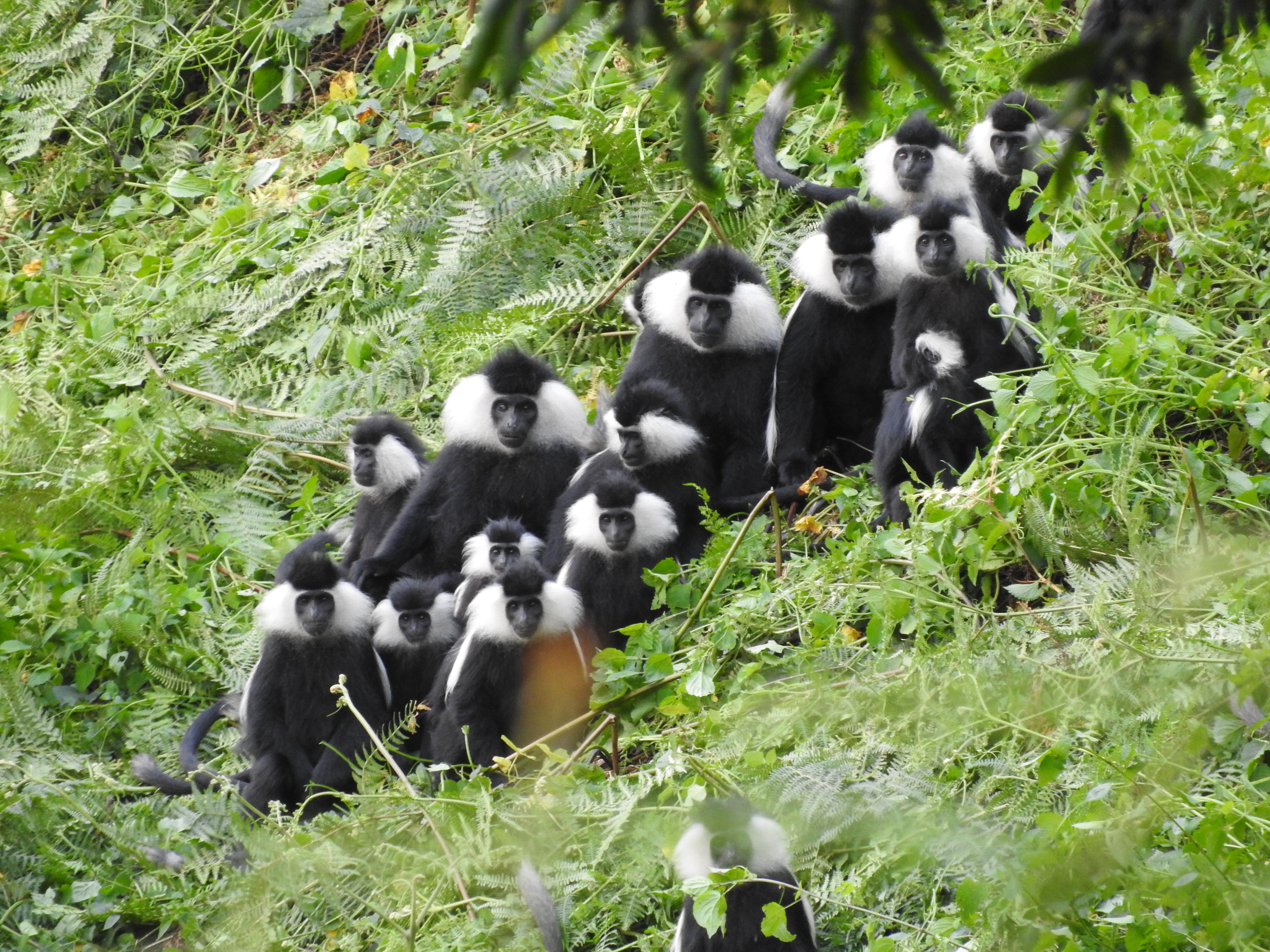
Ruwenzori colobus unit

Rwanda became independent in 1962, and the country's forest reserves were managed by the Ministry of Agriculture. From 1958 to 1973, Nyungwe Forest was reduced by over 150 km^{2} due to fires, woodcutting, hunting of animals, and small-scale agriculture. Nearby Gishwati and Virunga forests were cut in half at this time. In 1969, elephants still numbered in the hundreds in Nyungwe. In 1974, the last buffalo was killed in Nyungwe by hunters. In 1984, Nyungwe was divided into areas that allow for sustainable use and harvesting of timber. The Government of Rwanda developed a plan for a buffer zone that can still be seen today. In 1984, biodiversity surveys conducted by the Wildlife Conservation Society (WCS) with RDB documented colobus in groups of up to 400 members—an unheard of phenomenon. In 1987, development of the trail system began at Uwinka. In 1994, war and genocide devastated the country and destroyed many of the research and tourist facilities in Uwinka. Most senior staff were forced to flee, but many junior staff members at Nyungwe stayed on to protect the park. The park began to rebuild in 1995, but security and stability were still uncertain. In 1999, the last elephant in Nyungwe was killed in the swamp by poachers.

== Revenue and economic impact ==
Nyungwe National Park is projected to generate approximately FRw 4,800,000,000 in revenues in 2025, contributing significantly to Rwanda's economy. Managed by African Parks, efforts focus on attracting investment and promoting sustainable tourism. Domestic visitors make up an estimated 45–50% of tourists, while international visitors account for 35–40%, with ongoing initiatives to encourage longer stays and increased spending. Revenue supports conservation programs, infrastructure development, and job creation, with a long-term strategy aimed at balancing economic benefits with environmental protection.
