= Wilderness (company) =

African ecotourism operator

- Formerly: Wilderness Safaris
- Type: ecotourism operator
- Traded as: WIL (BSE)
- Industry: Tourism, Conservation
- Founded: 1983
- Founders: Colin Bell, Chris McIntyre
- Headquarters: Gaborone, Botswana
- Website: www.wildernessdestinations.com

Wilderness is an ecotourism operator, headquartered in Gaborone, Botswana. It operates camps and mobile safaris across seven countries: Botswana, Kenya, Namibia, Rwanda, South Africa, Zambia and Zimbabwe. Known for its ongoing conservation work, the company is helping to conserve some 33 species on the IUCN Red List and lists some 2.5 million hectares as being under protection.

As a destination management company, Wilderness Safaris has its own bush air charter company, Wilderness Air, as well as touring arms in Victoria Falls, Zimbabwe/Zambia and Wilderness Safaris Private Journeys in Cape Town, South Africa.

Through the Wilderness Wildlife Trust, Wilderness Safaris funds more than 20 conservation, community and anti-poaching projects every year, and it is also a primary sponsor of Children in the Wilderness, a non-profit organisation that facilitates sustainable conservation through leadership development and education of rural children in Africa.

Wilderness was founded in Botswana in 1983 by two overland safari guides, Colin Bell and Chris McIntyre. It was the first tour operator of its kind to form a registered company in Botswana, with operations based out of Maun, south of the Okavango Delta.
