= Akagera National Park =

National park in Rwanda

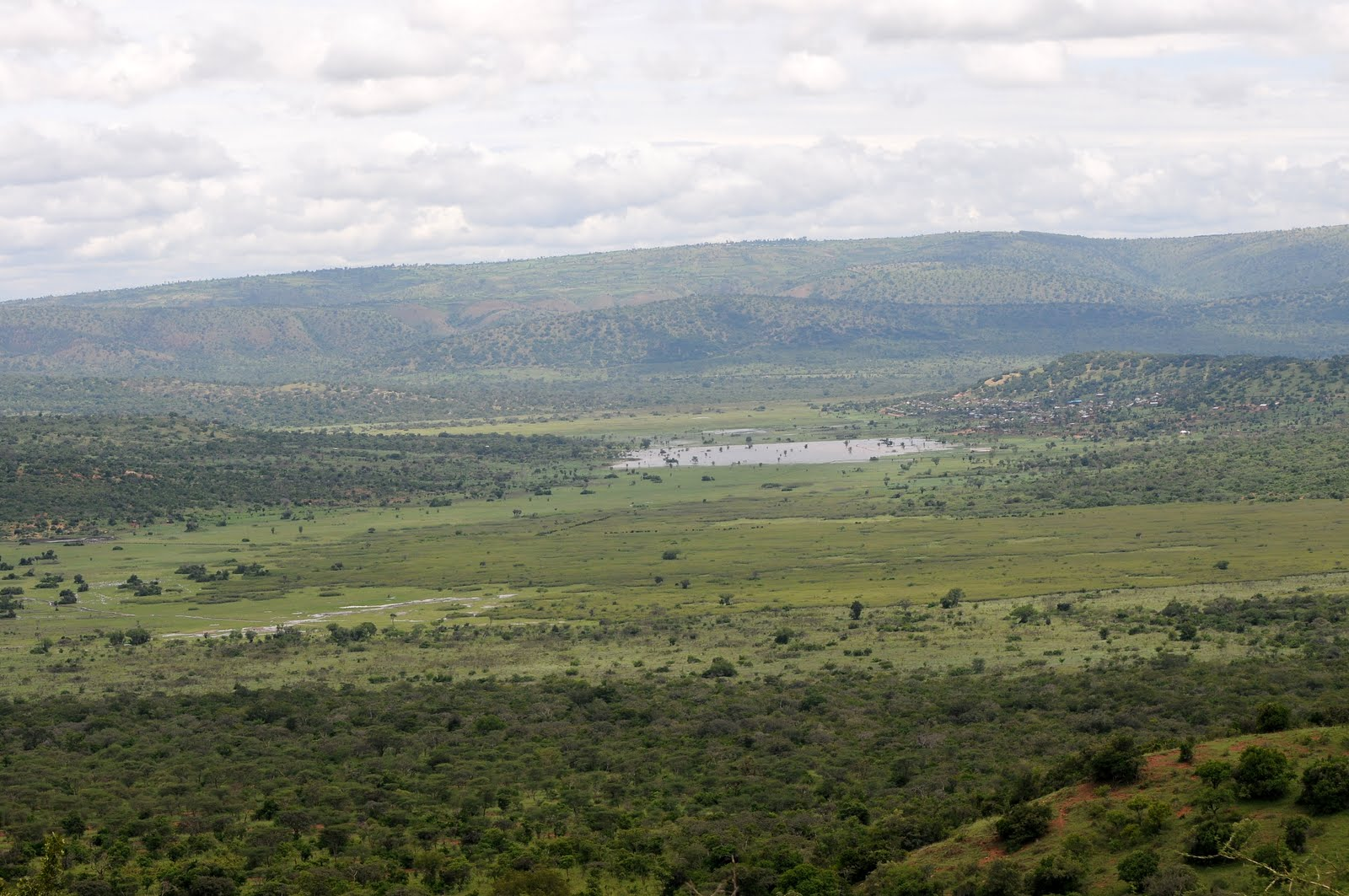
- A view of Akagera National Park in 2011

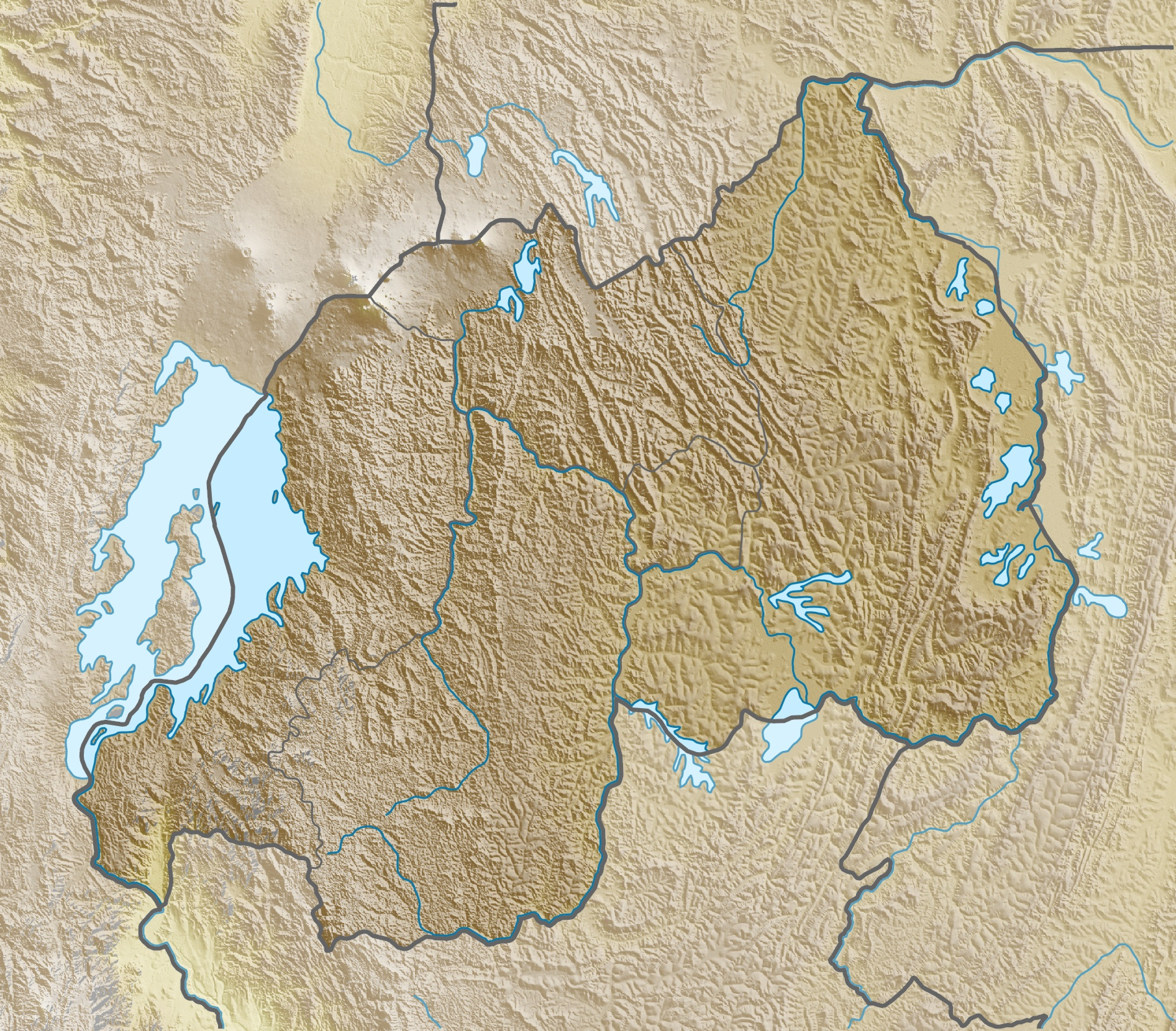
- Location within Rwanda
- Location: Rwanda
- Coordinates: 01°38′S 30°47′E
- Area: 1,122 km^{2} (433 sq mi)
- Created: 1934
- Visitors: 59,538 (in 2025)
- Governing body: Rwanda Development Board and African Parks

Akagera National Park is a national park in eastern Rwanda covering 1,122 km^{2} (433 sq mi) along the international border with Tanzania. It was founded in 1934 and includes savannah, montane and swamp habitats. It is named for the Kagera River which flows along its eastern boundary feeding into Lake Ihema and several smaller lakes. The complex system of lakes and linking papyrus swamps makes up over a third of the park, which is the largest protected wetland in East Africa.

== History ==
Akagera National Park was founded in 1934 by the Belgian government, which at the time occupied Rwanda. The park was 2,500 km^{2} (970 sq mi) large and was known for its biodiversity. It used to have a large population of African wild dogs. At one point, it was known as the 'Parc aux Lycaons' and wild dogs were so abundant that the Belgian government considered them a pest. However, a disease epidemic diminished the population and the last wild dogs were seen in 1984.

In 2009, the Rwanda Development Board (RDB) and the African Parks Network entered into a 20-year renewable agreement for the joint management of Akagera National Park. The Akagera Management Company was formed in 2010 as the joint management body for Akagera National Park. Over the next 5 years a $10 million expenditure was carried out in the national park area, with financial help from the Howard Buffett Foundation. The aim was to increase the security of the national park and to reintroduce locally extinct species. Security measures that were taken include: the construction of a western boundary fence which measures 120.0 km (74.6 mi), deploying an air surveillance helicopter, training of an expert rhino tracking and protection team and a canine anti-poaching unit.

== Wildlife ==
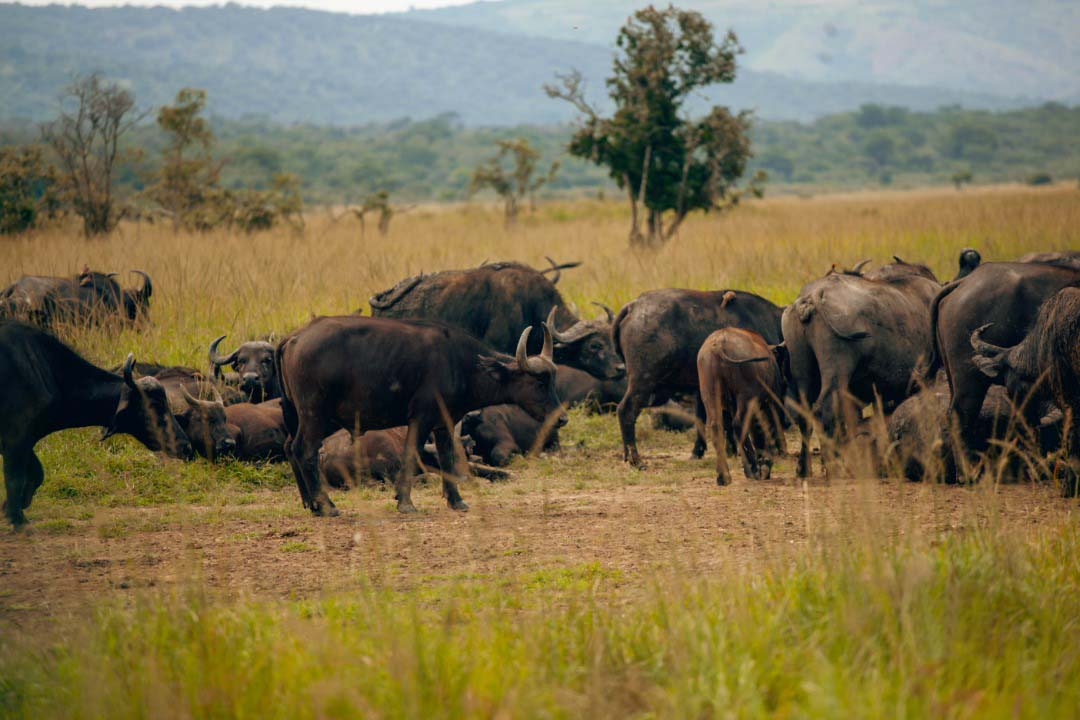
Buffaloes in Akagera National Park

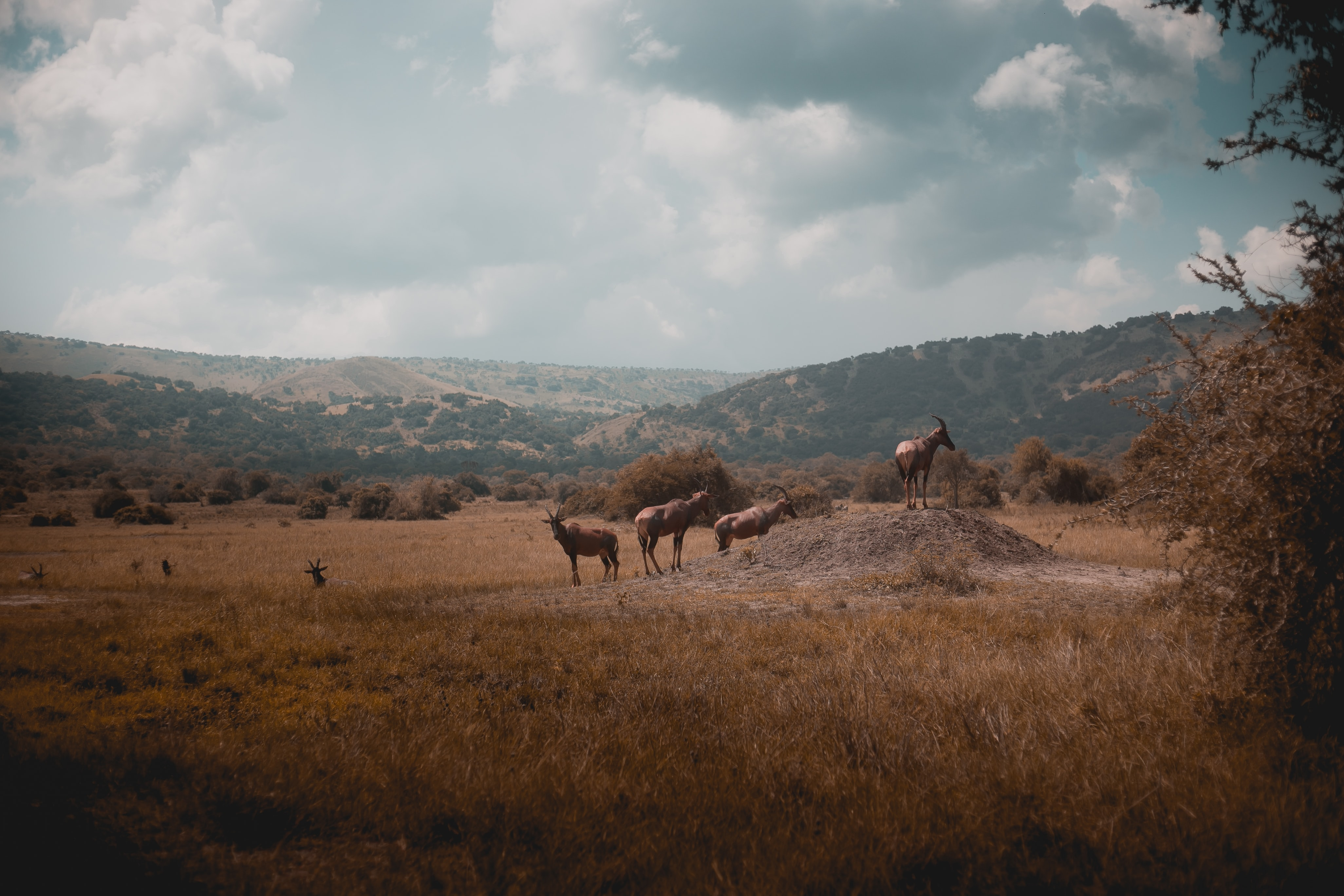
Topi antelopes in Akagera National Park

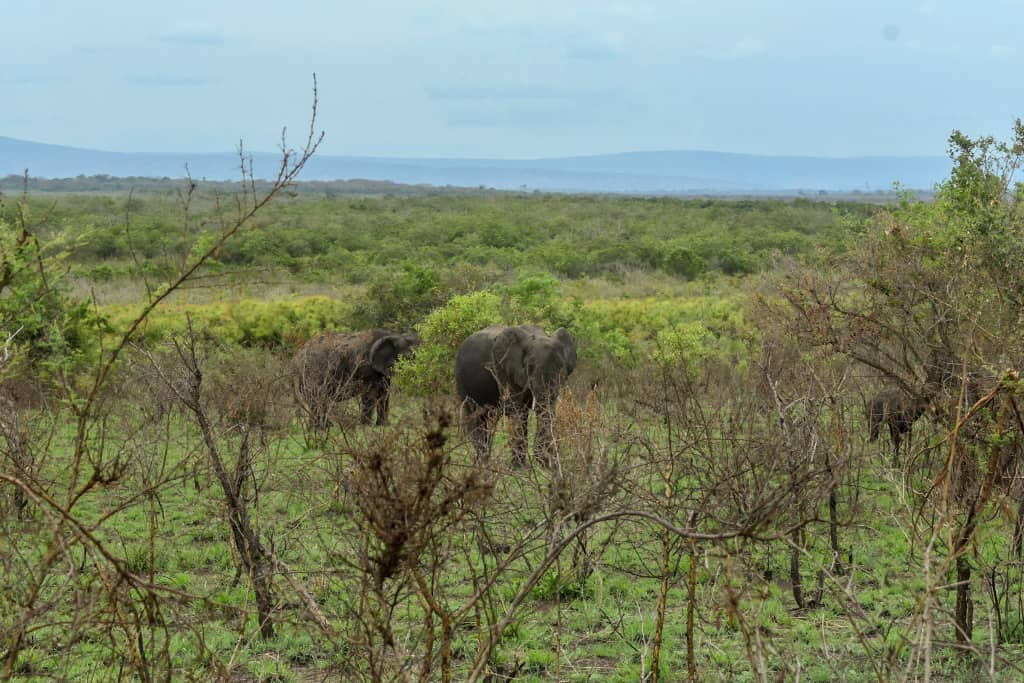
Elephants in Akagera National Park

In 1957, black rhinoceros were introduced from Tanzania. In the 1970s, more than 50 black rhinos lived in the savannah-habitat of the park. Due to widespread poaching, the population declined over the following decades, and the last confirmed sighting was in 2007. In May 2017, a joint operation by the Rwanda Development Board and African Parks saw the reintroduction of 18 eastern black rhinoceroses from South Africa, which had been absent for 10 years In June 2019, Akagera National Park received five eastern black rhinoceros from three zoos in Europe after a 30-hour journey; this relocation was the first of its kind.

In November 2021, 30 white rhinoceros were successfully translocated to Akagera National Park from Phinda Private Game Reserve in South Africa, in the largest single rhinoceros translocation aimed to extend the species' range and create a new breeding stronghold in Rwanda. In 2023, African Parks reported that several new calves had been born, giving hope that the animals had adapted to the new environment. In June 2025, a further 70 southern white rhinoceroses were translocated to Akagera National Park from the Munywana Conservancy in South Africa, in what remains the largest single rhinoceros translocation ever recorded. The translocation was funded by the Howard G. Buffett Foundation and carried out as part of African Parks' Rhino Rewild Initiative, a continent-wide programme to rewild 2,000 rhinos across Africa. Akagera now holds both eastern black rhinoceros and southern white rhinoceros, making it the only park in Rwanda with either species.

In 1986, Masai giraffes were introduced from Kenya. Their population has grown to 78 individuals in 2024.

Around 1990, Akagera was known to have a population of 250 to 300 lions. In the years that followed, the entire population was killed by farmers who returned to Rwanda after the 1994 genocide against the Tutsi and settled in the park. In July 2015, Tembe Elephant Park in KwaZulu-Natal donated two male lions. This effort was described by African Parks as "a ground-breaking conservation effort for both the park and the country" as part of a project aimed at reversing the local extinction of the species in Akagera National Park. In 2015, seven lions were reintroduced to the park, followed by two males from South Africa in 2017. With the return of lions and rhinos, Akagera became the only Big Five destination in Rwanda.

The large mammal population has increased since 2010, from 4,000 animals in 2010 to over 13,500 in 2018. Almost 500 bird species have been recorded in the park.

== Tourism ==
Since African Parks assumed management of the park in partnership with the Rwanda Development Board in 2010, tourism has increased from 8,000 people on 2010 to 44,000 in 2018. This increase has allowed Akagera to become 80% self-sustaining and therefore less reliant on donors. In 2025, Akagera became the first park in the African Parks network to cover its operating costs entirely from its own revenue. Ten percent of park income goes to Rwanda's revenue-sharing scheme for community projects.

According to the Rwanda Statistical Yearbook 2025, annual visits to Akagera rose from 11,239 in 2005 to 67,661 in 2024, making it the most visited national park in Rwanda. In 2025, park management reported 59,538 visitors, of whom 51,769 were paying visitors, and commercial revenue of $5.06 million. National Geographic named Akagera among its 25 "Best of the World" destinations for 2026.

== See also ==
- Mutara Game Reserve, an adjacent former protected area
- Serengeti
- National parks of Rwanda
