= Rwanda Development Board =

Investment and development agency

Coordinates: 01°57′19″S 30°06′10″E

- Type: Parastatal
- Industry: Investment and export promotion, tourism and conservation
- Founded: 2009
- Headquarters: Kigali, Rwanda
- Key people: Afrika Jean Guy (Executive Director and CEO)
- Products: Investment licenses, tax waivers, investment advisory, serviced land, SME training, tourism permits
- Website: Homepage

Rwanda Development Board (RDB), is a government department that integrates all government agencies responsible for the attraction, retention and facilitation of investments in the national economy.

== Overview ==
The Rwanda Development Board (RDB) was established in 2009 to coordinate, spur and promote national economic development. RDB includes agencies responsible for "business registration, investment promotion, environmental clearances, privatization and specialist agencies which support the priority sectors of ICT and tourism as well as SMEs and human capacity development in the private sector". The executive director is a cabinet-level position and the incumbent is appointed by and reports directly to the president of Rwanda. RDB measures its achievements in direct foreign and domestic investments, increased exports, and number of jobs created.

Visit Rwanda is the board's official brand to promote tourism in the country.

== Sponsorship ==
In May 2018, Arsenal FC announced Visit Rwanda as the club's first official shirt sleeve sponsor and the club's official tourism partner in a three-year £10 million per year deal. The deal was extended to another four years in 2021. In November 2025, Arsenal announced that they had reached a mutual agreement to not renew their deal in June 2026.

In December 2019, Paris Saint-Germain FC signed a three-year €8-10 million per year deal with Visit Rwanda as the club's official tourism partner. The Visit Rwanda logo will also appear on the back of the men's training kit and on the shirt sleeve of the women's team's kit. The deal was renewed in 2023 and 2025.

In May 2021, the Basketball Africa League (BAL) signed a sponsorship deal with Visit Rwanda as a founding and host partner of the BAL. Visit Rwanda will be showcased on BAL team uniforms. The deal was extended to another five years in 2023.

In August 2023, FC Bayern Munich signed a five-year partnership deal with Visit Rwanda as a football development and tourism promotion partner. In August 2025, FC Bayern announced that the commercial sponsorship will transition into a football talent development program through the FC Bayern Youth Academy in Kigali until 2028.

In April 2025, Visit Rwanda signed a three-year deal with Atlético Madrid to become the new shirt sponsor of the men's and women's team. In September of the same year, the Los Angeles Clippers of the National Basketball Association (NBA) and Los Angeles Rams of the National Football League (NFL) signed a long-term sponsorship deal with Visit Rwanda. The Visit Rwanda logo appears on the jersey patch of Clippers' jerseys.

In July 2026, Visit Rwanda signed a sponsorship deal with Aston Villa FC as the club's shirt sponsor, official tourism partner, and official coffee provider worth up to £20 million a year if bonuses are met.

=== Reaction ===
The Visit Rwanda initiative had a very positive effect on Rwanda’s economy. By partnering with big sports teams, the country has become more popular around the world. This has helped attract more tourists, leading to more money being made from tourism about $498 million in 2019, contributing 13% to Rwanda’s economy. It also created many new jobs and encouraged foreign businesses to invest in the country. These deals promote eco-tourism, business travel and job creation, helping Rwanda grow even more.

However, the sponsorship deals were met with criticism due to human rights abuse in the country. There were also claims of Rwandan president Paul Kagame is using sportswashing to enhance the country's reputation and potentially "persuading the international community to overlook alleged human right violations in the country." Another criticism concerned the fact that Rwanda, one of the poorest nations in the world, was paying millions of dollars to some of the world's richest football clubs instead of using the money to alleviate poverty in the country. In 2021, when Arsenal's initial three-year partnership was about to expire, prominent figures including journalist Michela Wrong and sports writer Barney Ronay were critical of the club's decision to renew the deal given Rwanda's human rights situation. In 2025, the government of the Democratic Republic of the Congo called on Arsenal, PSG, and Bayern Munich to drop their sponsorship deals with Visit Rwanda, citing Rwanda's alleged involvement with the M23 paramilitary group operating in the Congo and accused of numerous human rights violations.

== See also ==
- Parliament of Rwanda
