= Gorillas in the Mist (book) =

Memoir by researcher Dian Fossey

- Author: Dian Fossey
- Publisher: Houghton Mifflin
- Publication date: 1983
- Pages: xviii, 326 p., [80] p. of plates : ill.; 24 cm.
- ISBN: 9780395282175
- Dewey Decimal: 599.88/460451
- LC Class: QL737.P96 F67 1983

Gorillas in the Mist is a memoir by American primatologist and conservationist Dian Fossey, published in 1983.

== Overview ==
The book begins with Fossey's early career as she began working with naturalist Louis Leakey and spans thirteen years of Fossey's research into the behavior and biology of mountain gorillas in Rwanda. During this time Fossey lived among four families of gorillas in the Virunga Mountains, developing what's been described as an "unprecedented relationship" with the creatures.

In her book, Fossey shares her in-depth research into gorilla social and family bonds, including her work with a gorilla named Digit, who lived near the Karisoke Research Center. The book was primarily written during Fossey's time away from field work, as she was serving as a visiting associate professor at Cornell University.

The book was the basis of the 1988 film Gorillas in the Mist, in which Sigourney Weaver portrayed Fossey.
