= Dian Fossey Gorilla Fund International =

US-based non-profit organization

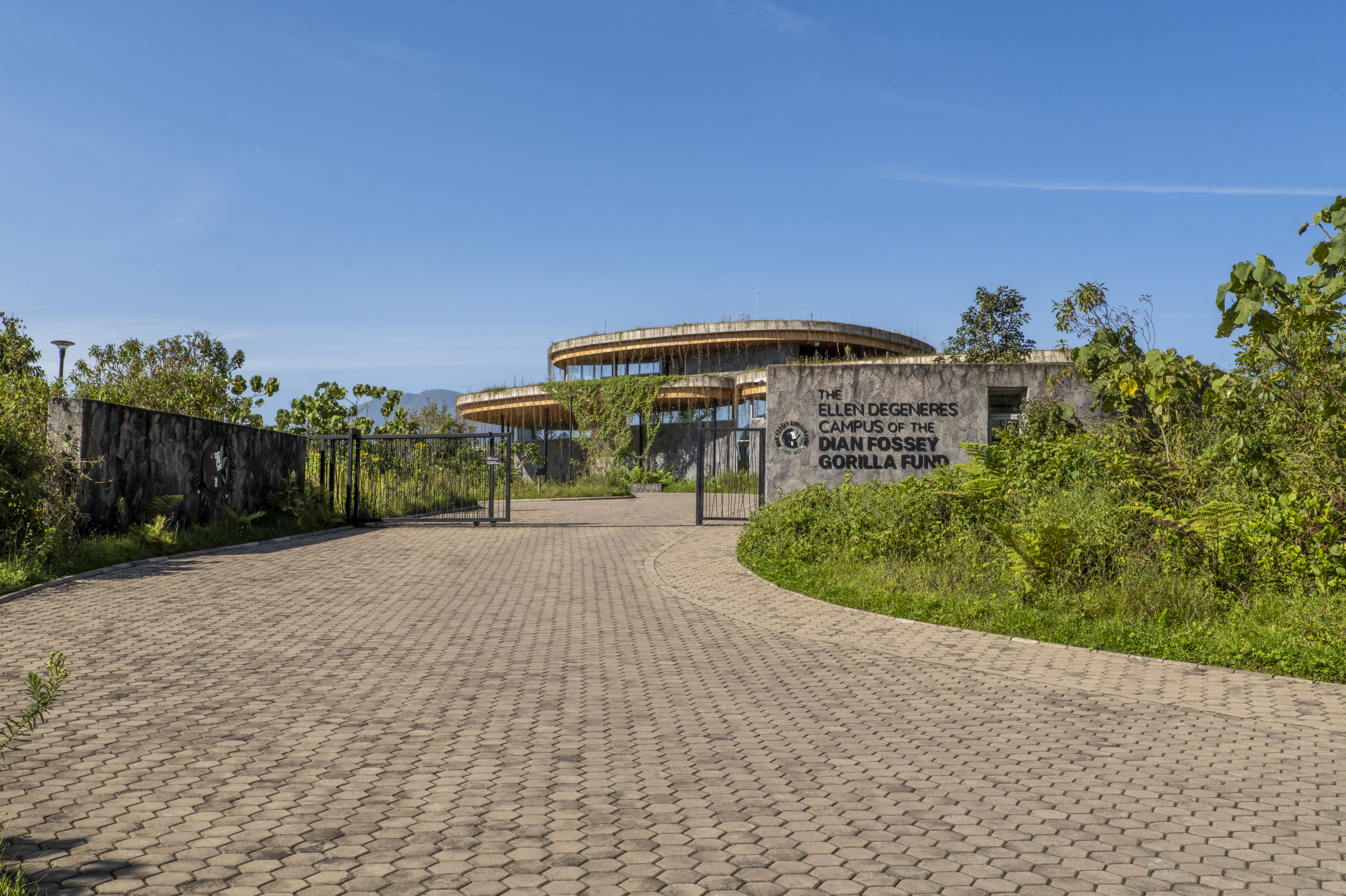
The Ellen DeGeneres Campus of the Dian Fossey Gorilla Fund in Rwanda

The Dian Fossey Gorilla Fund (originally the Digit Fund) is a nonprofit organization based in Atlanta, Georgia, for the protection of endangered mountain gorillas and Grauer's gorillas. The Digit Fund was created by Dian Fossey in 1978 to finance her anti-poaching patrols and prevent further poaching of the mountain gorillas. Fossey established the Karisoke Research Center in the Virunga Volcanoes of Rwanda. The non-profit fund was named in memory of Fossey's favorite gorilla, Digit.

Today, the Dian Fossey Gorilla Fund operates gorilla protection, education, science and community programs in Rwanda and the Democratic Republic of the Congo. In 2022, the Fossey Fund opened the Ellen DeGeneres Campus in Rwanda, which helps continue Fossey's mission and further support gorilla conservation.

== Current activities ==
The Dian Fossey Gorilla Fund continues to operate the Karisoke Research Center, which Fossey founded in 1967, with daily gorilla monitoring and patrols. The Fossey Fund now operates gorilla protection, education, science and community programs in Volcanoes National Park in Rwanda and in the Nkuba Conservation Area in the Democratic Republic of the Congo. Fossey Fund scientists and collaborators conduct studies about gorillas and the surrounding biodiversity in their habitats. The work begun by Fossey has now become one of the longest-running studies on any primate in the world. Multiple studies have shown that daily protection, the presence of researchers and the support of local communities have been tied to successful conservation.

Fossey's work with the gorillas was noted by David Attenborough in his 1978 filming for "Life on Earth" and in 2026 was featured in the Netflix documentary "A Gorilla Story: Told by David Attenborough." The film features the Pablo group of gorillas, first seen by Dian Fossey.

== Historical background ==
Sometime during the day on New Year's Eve 1977, Fossey's favorite gorilla, Digit, was killed by poachers. As the sentry of study group 4, he defended the group against six poachers and their dogs, who ran across the gorilla study group while checking antelope traplines. Digit took five spear wounds in ferocious self-defense and managed to kill one of the poachers' dogs, allowing the other 13 members of his group to escape. Fossey wrote "... I did not want Digit to have died in vain. I decided to launch a Digit Fund to support active conservation of gorillas...."

Fossey subsequently created the Digit Fund to raise money for anti-poaching patrols. In 1992 it was renamed the Dian Fossey Gorilla Fund International.

Today, the Dian Fossey Gorilla Fund, other organizations and the Rwanda Development Board work together to provide daily protection for the mountain gorillas, whose numbers have increased since Dian Fossey's time, with a total of more than 1,000 overall.

== Original financing ==
Busy with her research in Africa, Fossey enlisted the help of her friends, primatologist Richard Wrangham and TV presenter David Attenborough, who approached conservation organizations located in the UK including the Fauna Preservation Society (FPS) and the International Union for Conservation of Nature, which declined Fossey's request in favor of supporting an approach emphasizing tourism to Rwanda. Early donors included the National Geographic Society, which pledged $5,000, as did the World Wildlife Fund.

Fossey managed to keep the control of the Digit Fund in the United States until her death. Through the Digit Fund, Fossey financed patrols to destroy poachers' traps among the mountains of Virunga. In four months in 1979, the Fossey patrol consisting of four African staffers destroyed 987 poachers' traps in the research area's vicinity.

After Fossey was murdered, the Digit Fund was renamed the Dian Fossey Gorilla Fund and is now headquartered in Atlanta, Georgia.
