= Rosamond Carr =

American humanitarian, author and farmer

- Born: Rosamond Halsey; August 28, 1912; South Orange, New Jersey, U.S.
- Died: September 29, 2006 (aged 94); Gisenyi, Rwanda
- Resting place: Mugongo, Rwanda
- Occupations: Humanitarian, writer, farmer
- Organization: Imbabazi Orphanage
- Known for: Founding the Imbabazi Orphanage
- Notable work: Land of a Thousand Hills: My Life in Rwanda

Rosamond Carr (née Halsey) (August 28, 1912 – September 29, 2006) was an American humanitarian, writer and farmer.

She was born in South Orange, New Jersey. In 1942, she married the British explorer and film maker Kenneth Carr. The Carrs settled in the Belgian Congo in 1949, and after their divorce Rosamond settled in Mugongo, Rwanda to run a plantation growing pyrethrum flowers to produce pyrethrin, an organic insecticide sought the world over.

Carr was introduced to Dian Fossey in 1967, and the two became close friends and confidantes.

In 1994, Carr was evacuated from Mugongo by Belgian Marines during the Rwandan genocide, returning when her security was no longer at risk. She founded the Imbabazi Orphanage on December 17, 1994. With parts of Rwanda still unsafe, after 1997 both Carr and the Imbabazi Orphanage relocated to Gisenyi, where she continued to look after the day-to-day running of the orphanage and its 120 children. In December 2005, she was able to return to Mugongo, where the orphanage had been reestablished in a new building near her home.

In 1999 her autobiography, Land of a Thousand Hills: My Life in Rwanda, co-written with her niece Ann Howard Halsey, was published. It has since been translated into French and German.

A Mother's Love: Rosamond Carr & a Lifetime in Rwanda, a documentary project about her life and on which Carr acted as advisor, was produced by Standfast Productions Ltd., directed by Eamonn Gearon and photographed by Noel Donnellon. Carr acted in a similar capacity during production of Gorillas in the Mist starring Sigourney Weaver and directed by Michael Apted, with her character in that film played by Julie Harris.

Carr died on September 29, 2006, in Gisenyi, Rwanda. She was buried on Sunday, October 1 at Mugongo, her flower farm in the shadow of the Virunga Volcanoes. The new orphanage building, where her legacy continues, is next to the farm.
