= List of volcanoes in Rwanda =

This is a list of active and extinct volcanoes in Rwanda.

Name	Elevation		Location	Last eruption
Name	meters	feet	Coordinates	Last eruption
Mount Karisimbi	4507	14,783	1.50°S 29.45°E	Holocene
Muhabura	4127	13,537	1.38°S 29.67°E	Holocene
Mount Bisoke	3711	12,172	1.47°S 29.492°E	1957
