= Eugène Rutagarama =

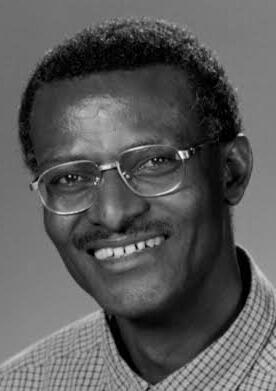
- Known for: Efforts on saving the population of mountain gorillas in the Virungas mountains
- Awards: Goldman Environmental Prize (2001)

Eugène Rutagarama is an environmentalist from Rwanda. He was awarded the "Goldman Environmental Prize" in 2001, for his efforts on saving the population of mountain gorillas in the Volcanoes National Park at Virungas mountains, during the war and recent conflicts in the Democratic Republic of Congo.

== Career ==
Since 2001, Rutagarama has been persistently engaged in his conservation endeavors, contributing to the facilitation of global collaborative initiatives aimed at safeguarding the Central Albertine Rift, a region known for its diverse flora and fauna, including the natural habitat of the Virunga mountain gorillas. Eugène has also held high positions at the Wildlife Conservation Society, the Dian Fossey Gorilla Fund's Karisoke Research Center, and Rwanda's national parks agency, post the 1994 war and genocide. Currently, Eugène works as a senior conservation counselor at Wild Earth Allies, where he concentrates on preserving gorilla habitats by fostering community development. Two years after being awarded the Goldman Prize, Rutagarama took up the position of director of the International Gorilla Conservation Program (IGCP). He served in this role for nine years. In 2012, Rutagarama was appointed as the senior Technical Advisor to the Greater Virunga Transboundary Collaboration, an intergovernmental organization established by the DR of Congo, Rwanda, and Uganda with the assistance of IGCP.
