= Bob Campbell (photographer) =

English wildlife photographer and filmmaker (1930–2014)

Robert Ian Martin Campbell (October 29, 1930 – June 14, 2014) was an English wildlife photographer and filmmaker known for his footage and photographs of Dian Fossey and mountain gorillas published in the January 1970 issue of National Geographic. Many of his photographs are available at the University of Florida Digital Collections site, "Wildlife Conservation". He was raised in Nairobi, Kenya by his English parents who had fled from the aftermath of the First World War.

== Early life and education ==
Campbell was born in England in 1930 and grew up in Kitale, Kenya. After meeting Des Bartlett in 1961 Campbell decided to pursue photography as a career. Before becoming a professional photographer Campbell worked as a Jaguar mechanic.

== Legacy ==
Campbell was portrayed by Bryan Brown in the 1988 film Gorillas in the Mist, an adaptation of Dian Fossey's autobiography, although he is portrayed as Australian instead of English.
