= Brian Saunders (sound engineer) =

- Occupation: Sound engineer
- Years active: 1977–1996

Brian Saunders is a sound engineer. He was nominated for an Academy Award in the category Best Sound for the film Gorillas in the Mist.

== Selected filmography ==
- Gorillas in the Mist (1988)
