= Volcanoes National Park =

National park in Rwanda

- French: Parc National des Volcans Kinyarwanda: Pariki y’Igihugu y’Ibirunga
- IUCN category II (national park)
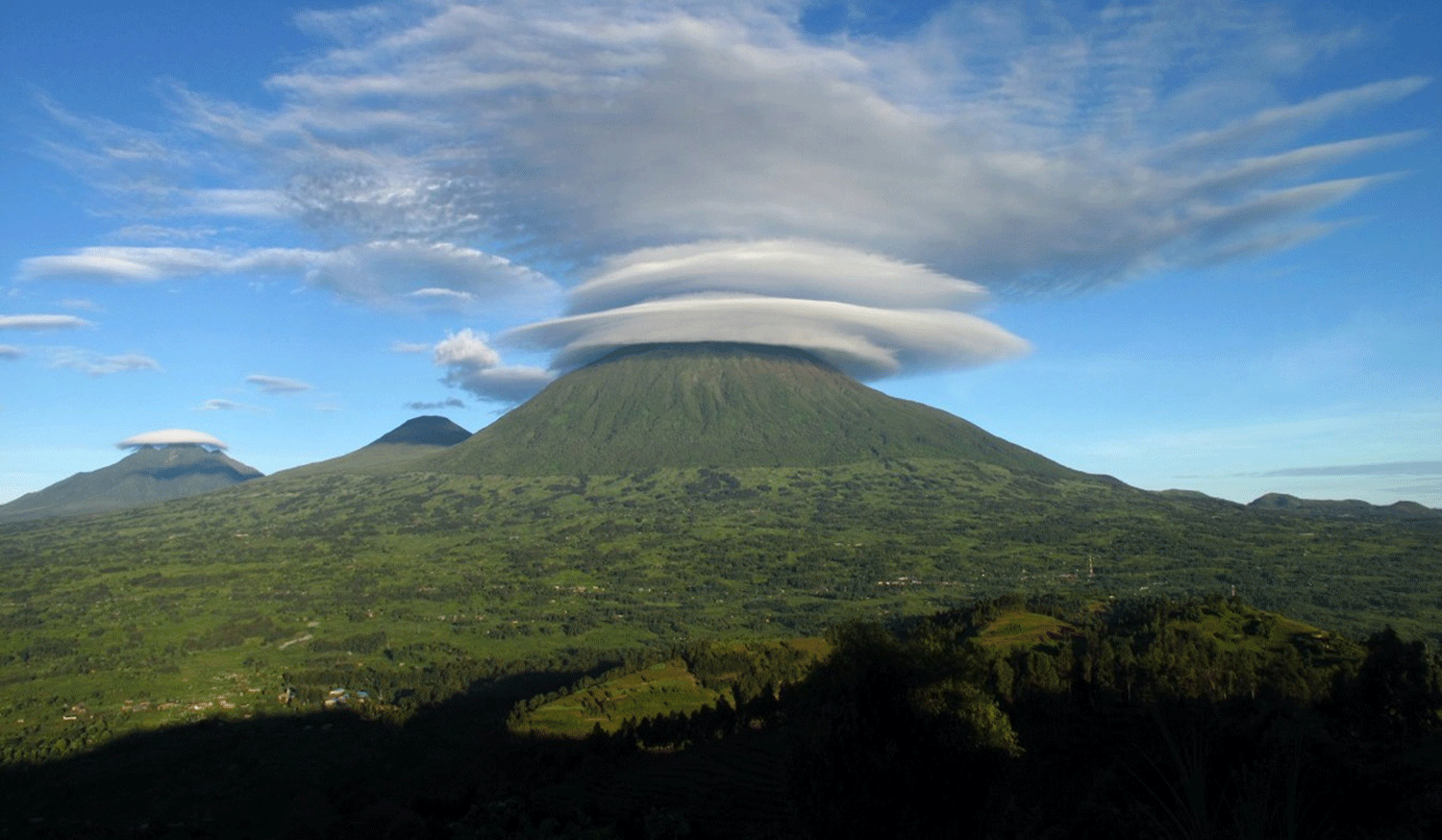
- Mount Bisoke in Volcanoes National Park

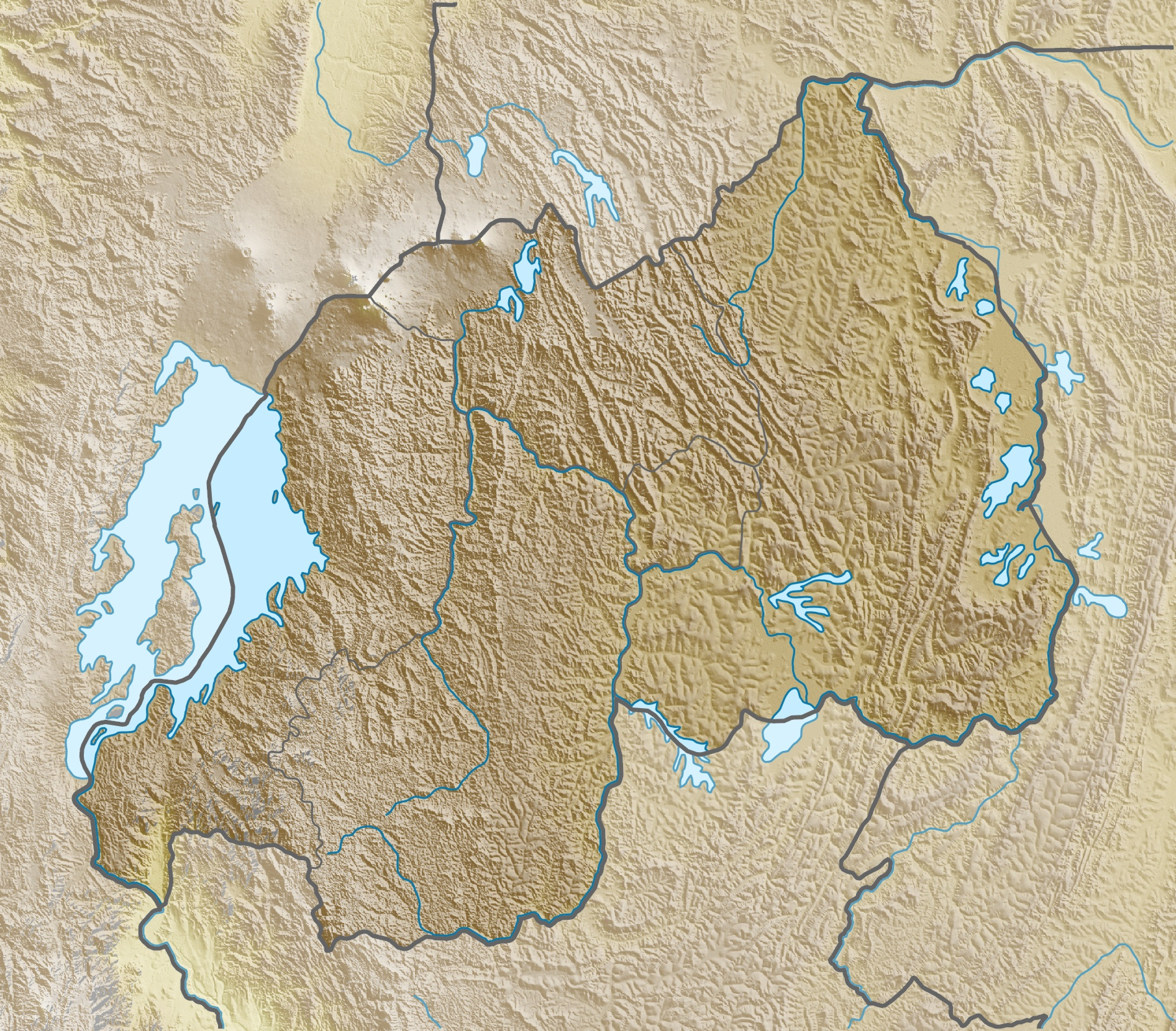
- Location within Rwanda
- Location: Rwanda
- Coordinates: 01°28′03″S 29°29′33″E
- Area: 160 km^{2} (62 sq mi)

Volcanoes National Park is a national park in northwestern Rwanda. It covers 160 km^{2} (62 sq mi) of rainforest and encompasses five of the eight volcanoes in the Virunga Mountains, namely Karisimbi, Bisoke, Muhabura, Gahinga and Sabyinyo. It borders Virunga National Park in the Democratic Republic of the Congo and Mgahinga Gorilla National Park in Uganda. It is home to the mountain gorilla and the golden monkey, and was the base for the primatologist Dian Fossey.

== History ==
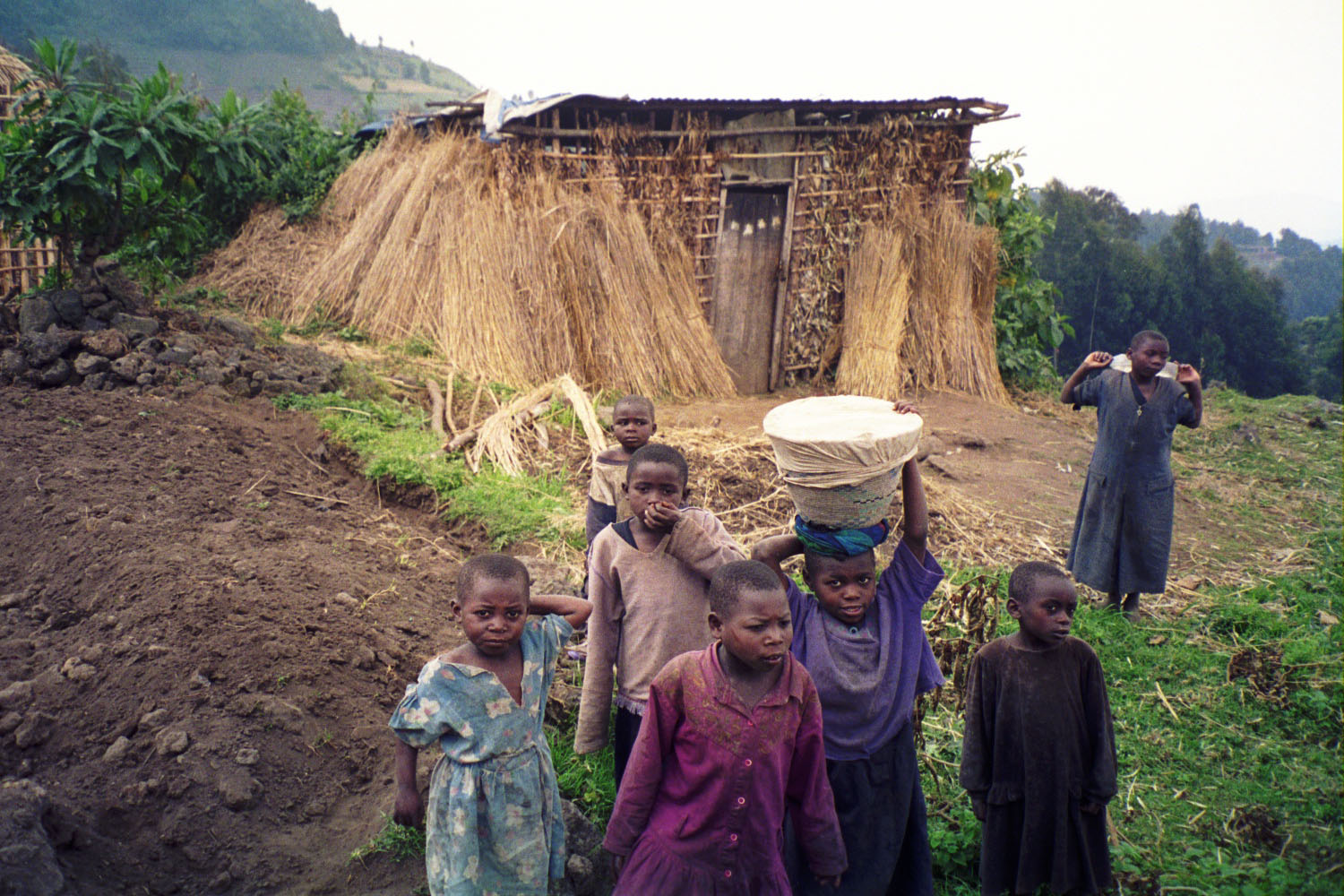
Children on a farm near Volcanoes National Park

The park was established in 1925, as a small area bounded by Karisimbi, Bisoke and Mikeno, intended to protect the gorillas from poachers. It was the first national park to be created in Africa. In 1929, the borders of the park were extended further into Rwanda and into the Belgian Congo, to form the Albert National Park, an area of 8,090 km^{2} (3,120 sq mi), run by the Belgian colonial authorities who were in charge of both colonies. In 1958, 700 ha (2.7 sq mi) of the park were cleared for a human settlement.

Between 1969 and 1973, 1,050 hectares of the park were cleared to grow pyrethrum. During the 1970s and 1980s, the indigenous Twa people were involuntarily resettled out of Volcanoes National Park.

The park later became the base for the American naturalist Dian Fossey to carry out her research on the gorillas. She arrived in 1967 and set up the Karisoke Research Centre between Karisimbi and Visoke. From then on, she spent most of her time in the park, and is widely credited with saving the gorillas from extinction by bringing their plight to the attention of the international community. She was murdered by unknown assailants at her home in 1985, a crime often attributed to the poachers she had spent her life fighting against. Fossey's life later was portrayed on the big screen in the film Gorillas in the Mist, named after her autobiography. She is buried in the park in a grave close to the research center, and amongst the gorillas which became her life.

The Volcanoes National Park became a battlefield during the Rwandan Civil War, with the park headquarters being attacked in 1992. The research centre was abandoned, and all tourist activities (including visiting the gorillas) were stopped. They did not resume again until 1999 when the area was deemed to be safe and under control. There have been occasional infiltrations by Rwandan rebels from the Democratic Forces for the Liberation of Rwanda in subsequent years, but these are always stopped quickly by the Rwandan army and there is thought to be no threat to tourism in the park.

Buhanga Eco-Park, an ancient woodland containing Rwanda's most interesting folklore, and Musanze Caves, constructed 62 million years ago after the last estimated volcanic explosion, are both located inside the limits of Volcanoes National Park.

== Flora and fauna ==
=== Flora ===
Vegetation varies considerably due to the large altitudinal range within the park. There is some lower montane forest (now mainly lost to agriculture). Between 2400 and 2500 m, there is Neoboutonia forest. From 2500 to 3200 m Oldeania alpina (bamboo) forest occurs, covering about 30% of the park area. From 2600 to 3600 m, mainly on the more humid slopes in the south and west, is Hagenia-Hypericum forest, which covers about 30% of the park. This is one of the largest forests of Hagenia abyssinica. The vegetation from 3500 to 4200 m is characterised by Lobelia wollastonii, L. lanurensis, and Dendrosenecio erici-rosenii and covers about 25% of the park. From 4300 to 4500 m grassland occurs. Secondary thicket, meadows, marshes, swamps and small lakes also occur, but their total area is relatively small.

=== Fauna ===
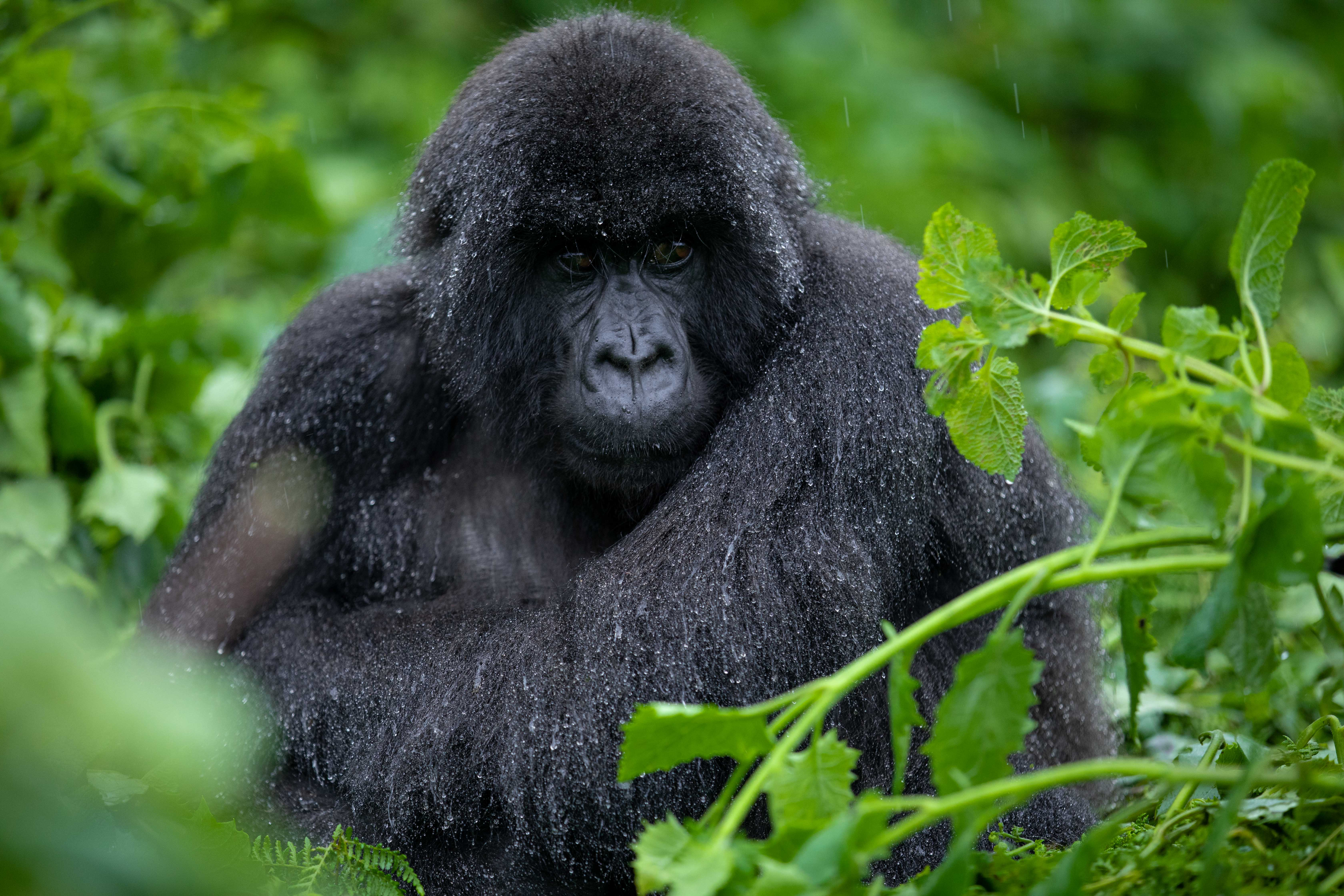
Mountain gorilla in the park

The park is best known for the mountain gorilla (Gorilla beringei beringei). Other mammals include: golden monkey (Cercopithecus mitis kandti), black-fronted duiker (Cephalophus niger), African buffalo (Syncerus caffer), spotted hyena (Crocuta crocuta) and harnessed bushbuck (Tragelaphus scriptus). The bushbuck population is estimated to be between 1760 and 7040 animals. There are also reported to be African elephants in the park, though these are now very rare. There are 178 recorded bird species, with at least 13 species and 16 subspecies endemic to the Virunga and Rwenzori Mountains.

== Expansion ==
In 2022, the Government of Rwanda announced plans to expand this national park from 13,000 ha (50 mi^{2}) to 23,000 ha (89 mi^{2}). Of the new 10,000 ha (39 mi^{2}), park activities will expand into an estimated new 3,740 ha (14.4 mi^{2}), and an estimated 6,260 ha (24.2 mi^{2}) will be used to create a buffer zone between the national park and the surrounding human communities. The buffer zone will be used for agriculture, particularly agroforestry, which will benefit the park and the humans together. It is expected that this arrangement will reduce "human-wildlife conflicts by 80 percent". Work was expected to start in 2022 and last five years, working with a budget of US$255 million. The Rwanda Development Board announced that a pilot program will begin in 2024.

== See also ==
- Eugène Rutagarama
