= Dian Fossey =

American primatologist (1932–1985)

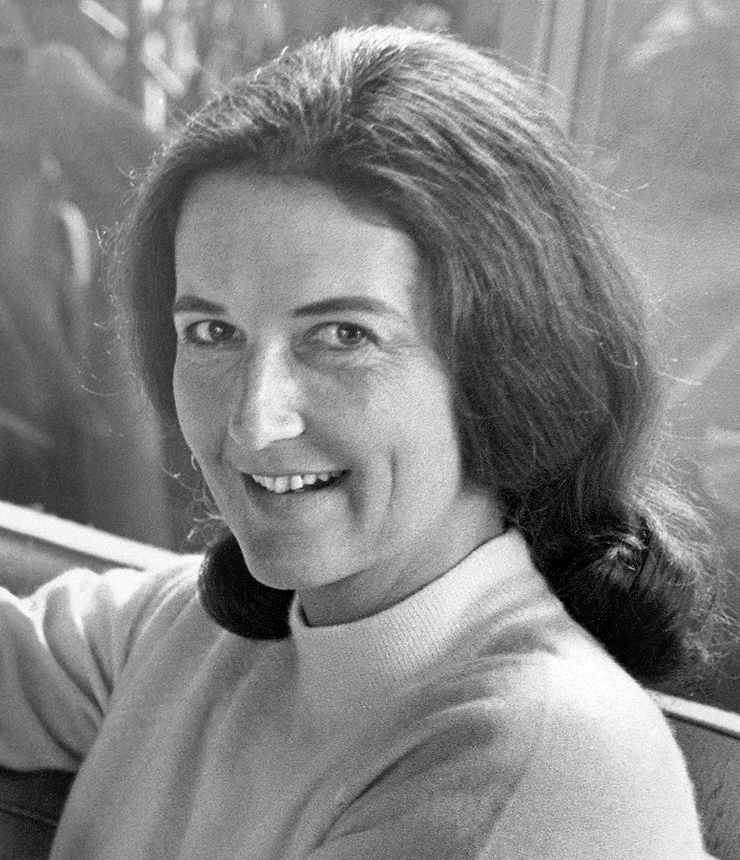
- Fossey in 1968
- Born: January 16, 1932; San Francisco, California, U.S.
- Died: December 26, 1985 (aged 53); Volcanoes National Park, Rwanda
- Cause of death: Murder
- Resting place: Karisoke Research Center
- Education: College of Marin; San Jose State University (BA); Darwin College, Cambridge (PhD)
- Known for: Study and conservation of the mountain gorilla
- Scientific career
- Fields: Ethology; Primatology
- Workplaces: Karisoke Research Center; Cornell University
- Thesis: The Behaviour of the Mountain Gorilla (1976)
- Doctoral advisor: Robert Hinde

Signature
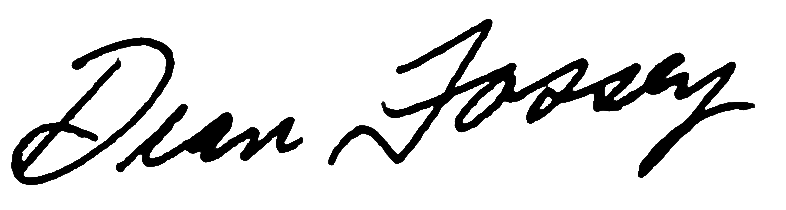

Dian Fossey (January 16, 1932 – December 26, 1985 (Note: On Sunday, December 29, 1985, the Associated Press reported Fossey's death: "A Nairobi-based diplomat, Gregoire Karambizi, told the Associated Press the killing was reported Saturday morning on state-run Radio Rwanda. Officials at the radio station, in the Rwandan capital of Kigali, later said by telephone that Fossey was killed Thursday [December 26].")) was an American primatologist and conservationist known for undertaking an extensive study of mountain gorilla groups from 1966 until her murder in 1985. She studied them daily in the mountain forests of Rwanda, initially encouraged to work there by paleoanthropologist Louis Leakey. Gorillas in the Mist, a book published two years before her death, is Fossey's account of her scientific study of the gorillas at the Karisoke Research Center and her prior career. It is one of the sources for a 1988 film of the same name.

Fossey was a leading primatologist and one of The Trimates, a group of female scientists recruited by Leakey to study great apes in their natural environments. Her counterparts Jane Goodall and Birutė Galdikas studied chimpanzees and orangutans, respectively.

Fossey spent 20 years in Rwanda, where she promoted "active conservation", (Note: Fossey described a range of practical actions that could improve the mountain gorillas' chances of survival. "Active conservation includes frequent patrols in wildlife areas to destroy poacher equipment and weapons, firm and prompt law enforcement, census counts in regions of breeding and ranging concentration, and strong safeguards for the limited habitat the animals occupy. Such inglorious activities monetarily benefit no person, yet offer the diminished number of animals in the forests an opportunity to survive into the future.") opposed poaching and tourism in wildlife habitats, and made more people acknowledge the sapience of gorillas. After the 1977 killing of her favorite gorilla, Digit, and the deaths of some of the animals she studied most, Fossey devoted less of her time to scientific research and more to protecting the gorillas. Her direct tactics escalated tensions, and she was murdered in her cabin at Karisoke on December 26, 1985. Although Fossey's American research assistant was convicted in absentia, there is no consensus as to who killed her. Fossey was buried beside Digit in the gorilla graveyard she constructed at Karisoke.

Although Fossey had anticipated that the mountain gorilla would not survive to the year 2000, (Note: "At present," Fossey wrote in 1983, "the next two decades are estimated to see the extinction of twenty species of animals. Human beings must decide now whether or not the mountain gorilla will become one of them, a species discovered and extinct within the same century.") her research and conservation work helped reduce the downward population trend of the species.

== Early life ==
Fossey was born in San Francisco, California, the daughter of Hazel (née Kidd), a fashion model, and George Edward Fossey III, a real estate agent and business owner. Her parents divorced when she was six. Her mother remarried the following year, to businessman Richard Price. Her father tried to keep in contact, but her mother discouraged it, and all contact was subsequently lost. Fossey's stepfather, Richard Price, never treated her as his own child. He would not allow Fossey to sit at the dining room table with him or her mother during dinner. A man adhering to strict discipline, Richard Price offered Fossey little to no emotional support. In 1950, Richard and Hazel relocated with Dian to Marin County, the same county where her father George Fossey, now married to Mrs. Gladys Bove (née Kohler), resided. George and Gladys later divorced. George Fossey's third and final marriage was to Kathryn Smith around 1959. Kathryn has mistakenly been cited as Dian's mother over the years. Struggling with personal insecurity, Fossey turned to animals as a way to gain acceptance. Her love for animals began with her first pet goldfish and continued throughout her life. At age six, she began riding horses, earning a letter from her school; by her college graduation in 1954, Fossey had established herself as an equestrienne.

=== Education and medical career ===
Fossey attended Lowell High School. Following her stepfather's guidance, she enrolled in a business course at the College of Marin in Kentfield. However, spending her summer on a ranch in Montana at age 19 rekindled her love of animals, and she enrolled in a pre-veterinary course in biology at the University of California, Davis. In defiance of her stepfather's wish that she attend a business school, Fossey decided to devote her professional life to working with animals. Consequently, Fossey's parents failed to give her any substantial financial support in her adult life. She supported herself by working as a clerk at a White Front department store, doing other clerking and laboratory work, and laboring as a machinist in a factory.

Although Fossey had always been an exemplary student, she had difficulty with chemistry and physics and failed her second year of the program. She transferred to San Jose State College where she became a member of Kappa Alpha Theta sorority and studied occupational therapy, receiving her bachelor's degree in 1954. Fossey began her career in occupational therapy. She interned at hospitals in California and worked with tuberculosis patients. Fossey had become a prizewinning equestrian, which drew her to Kentucky in 1955, and a year later took a job as an occupational therapist at the Kosair Crippled Children's Hospital in Louisville.

Her shy, reserved personality helped her work well with the children at the hospital. Fossey became close to her coworker, Mary White "Gaynee" Henry, secretary to the hospital's chief administrator and the wife of one of the doctors, Michael J. Henry. The Henrys invited Fossey to join them on their family farm, where she worked with livestock daily and experienced the inclusive family atmosphere that had been missing for most of her life. During her free time, she pursued her love of horses.

== The Leakeys and the Congo ==
=== Journey to Africa ===
Fossey turned down an offer to join the Henrys on an African tour due to lack of finances, but in 1963, she borrowed $8,000 (one year's salary), took out her life savings and went on a seven-week visit to Africa. In September 1963, she arrived in Nairobi, Kenya. She employed safari guide John Alexander for her travels through Kenya, Tanzania, Democratic Republic of Congo, and Rhodesia, now Zimbabwe. Their route included visits to Tsavo, East Africa's largest national park; the saline lake of Manyara, famous for attracting giant flocks of flamingos; and the Ngorongoro Crater, well known for its abundant wildlife. The final two sites for her visit were Olduvai Gorge in Tanzania (the archeological site of Louis and Mary Leakey); and Mt. Mikeno in Congo, where, in 1959, American zoologist George Schaller had carried out a yearlong pioneering study of the mountain gorilla. At Olduvai Gorge, Fossey met the Leakeys while they were examining the area for hominid fossils. Leakey talked to Fossey about the work of English primatologist Jane Goodall and the importance of long-term research on the great apes.

Although Fossey had broken her ankle while visiting the Leakeys, by October 16, she was staying in Walter Baumgartel's small hotel in Uganda, the Travellers Rest. Baumgartel, an advocate of gorilla conservation, was among the first to see the benefits that tourism could bring to the area, and he introduced Fossey to Kenyan wildlife photographers Joan and Alan Root. The couple agreed to allow Fossey and Alexander to camp behind their own camp, and it was during these few days that Fossey first encountered wild mountain gorillas. After staying with friends in Rhodesia, Fossey returned home to Louisville to repay her loans. The weekend color supplement of The Courier-Journal published three articles and photographs by Fossey, detailing her visit to Africa.

=== Research in the Congo ===
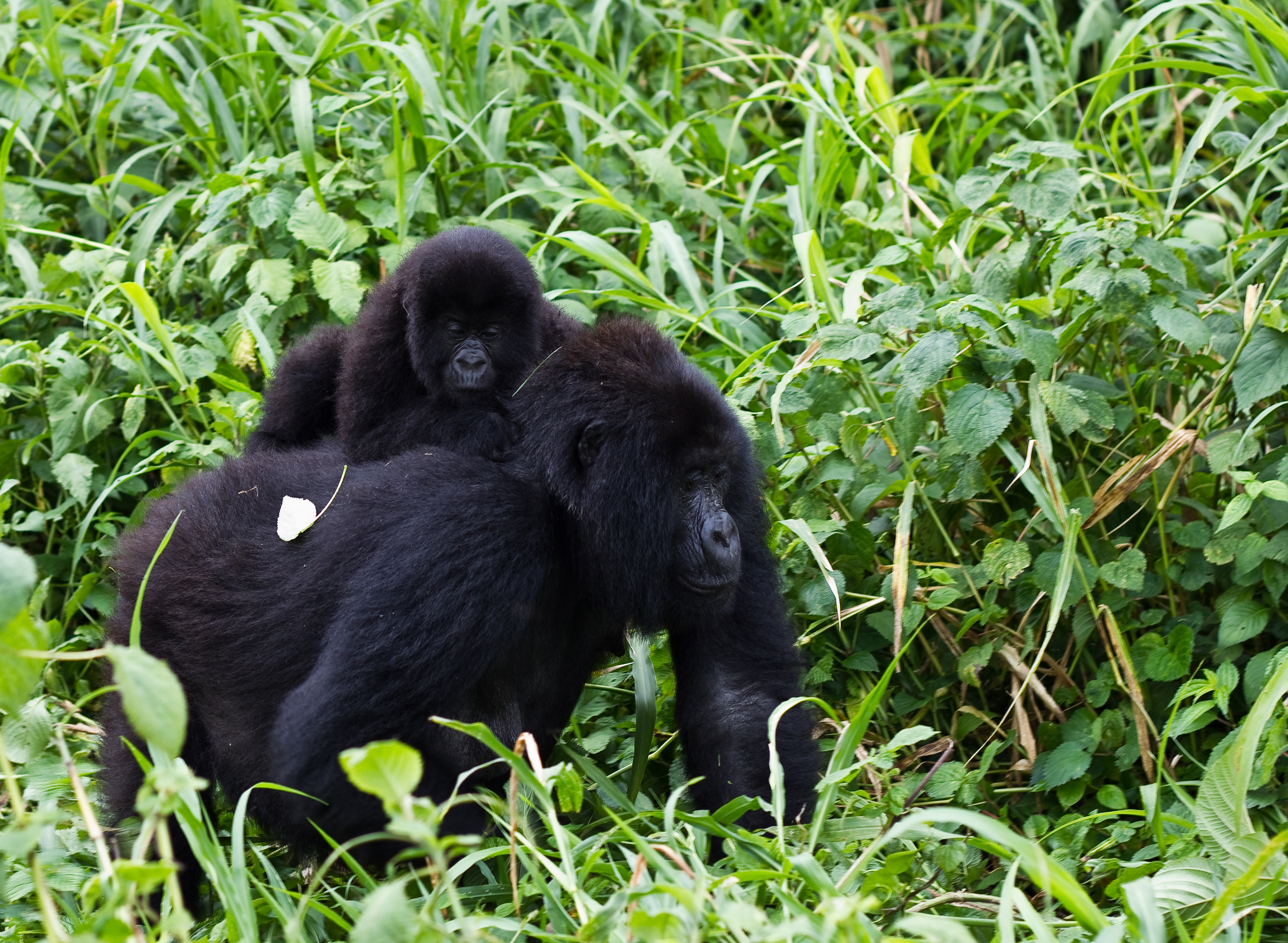
Gorilla mother with infant in Virunga National Park in the Congo

When Leakey made an appearance in Louisville while on a nationwide lecture tour, Fossey took the color supplements that had appeared about her African trip in The Courier-Journal to show to Leakey, who remembered her and her interest in mountain gorillas. Three years after the original safari, Leakey suggested that Fossey could undertake a long-term study of the gorillas in the same manner as Jane Goodall had with chimpanzees in Tanzania. Leakey lined up funding for Fossey to research mountain gorillas, and Fossey left her job to relocate to Africa.

After studying Swahili and auditing a class on primatology during the eight months it took to get funding and her visas, Fossey arrived in Nairobi in December 1966. With the help of Joan Root and Leakey, Fossey acquired the necessary provisions and an old canvas-topped Land Rover which she named "Lily". On the way to the Congo, Fossey visited the Gombe Stream Research Centre to meet Goodall and observe her research methods with chimpanzees. Accompanied by photographer Alan Root, who helped her obtain work permits for the Virunga Mountains, Fossey began her field study at Kabara, in the Congo in early 1967, in the same meadow where Schaller had made his camp seven years earlier. Root taught her basic gorilla tracking, and his tracker Sanwekwe later helped in Fossey's camp. Living in tents on mainly tinned produce, once a month Fossey would hike down the mountain to "Lily" and make the two-hour drive to the village of Kikumba to restock.

Fossey identified three distinct groups in her study area, but could not get close to them. She eventually found that mimicking their actions and making grunting sounds reassured them, together with submissive behavior and eating of the local celery plant. She later attributed her success with habituating gorillas to her experience working as an occupational therapist with children with autism. Like George Schaller, Fossey relied greatly on individual "noseprints" for identification, initially via sketching and later by camera.

Fossey had arrived in the Congo in locally turbulent times. Known as the Belgian Congo until its independence in June 1960, unrest and rebellion plagued the new government until 1965, when Lieutenant General Joseph-Désiré Mobutu, by then commander-in-chief of the national army, seized control of the country and declared himself president for five years during what is now called the Congo Crisis. During the political upheaval, a rebellion and battles took place in the Kivu Province. On July 9, 1967, soldiers arrived at the camp to escort Fossey and her research workers down, and she was detained at Rumangabo for two weeks. Fossey eventually escaped through bribery to Walter Baumgärtel's Travellers Rest Hotel in Kisoro, where her escort was arrested by the Ugandan military. Advised by the Ugandan authorities not to return to Congo, after meeting Leakey in Nairobi, Fossey agreed with him against US Embassy advice to restart her study on the Rwandan side of the Virungas. In Rwanda, Fossey had met local American expatriate Rosamond Carr, who introduced her to Belgian local Alyette DeMunck. DeMunck had a local's knowledge of Rwanda and offered to find Fossey a suitable site for study.

== Conservation work in Rwanda ==
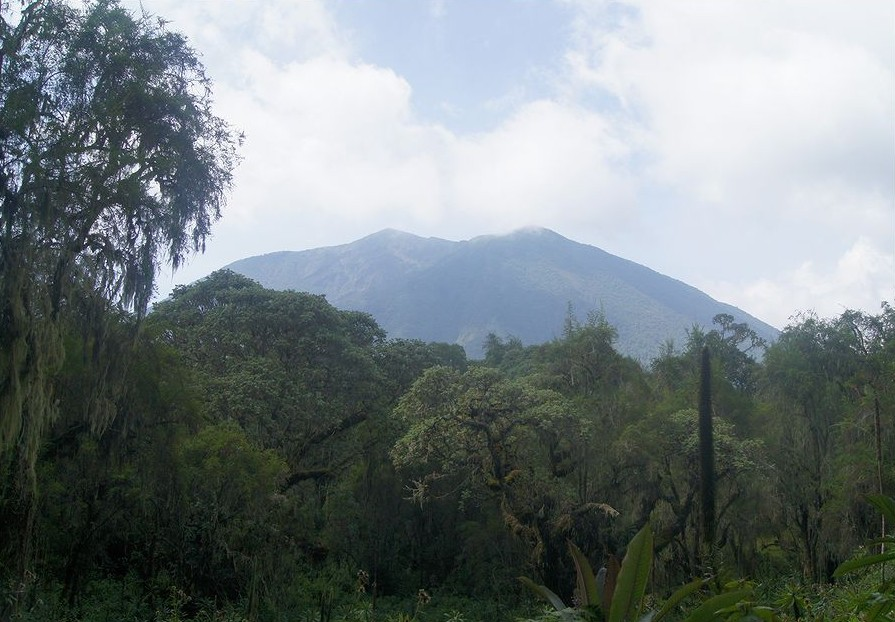
Fossey established her research camp in the foothills of Mount Bisoke.

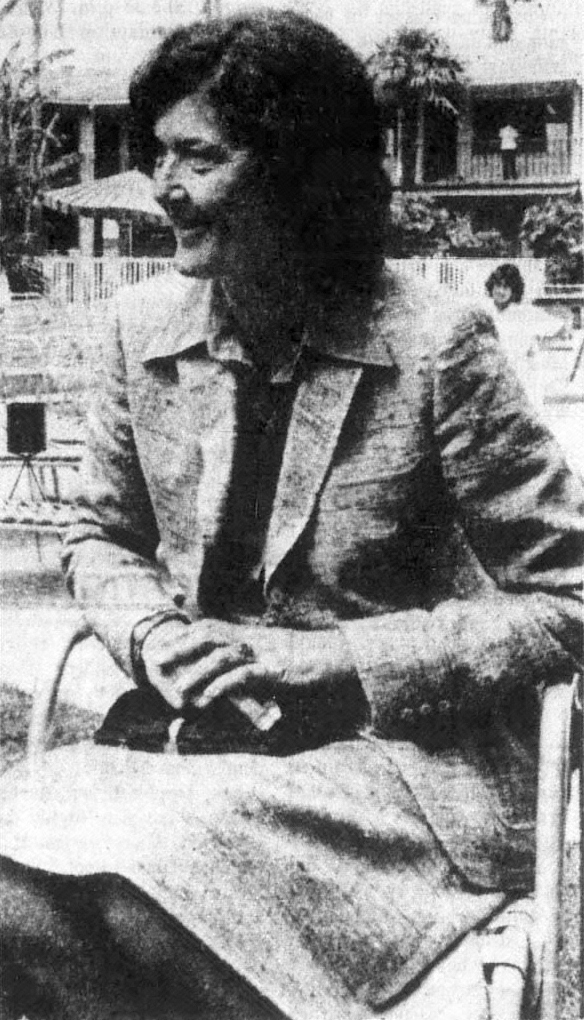
Fossey in 1981, while working and lecturing in the United States

On September 24, 1967, Fossey founded the Karisoke Research Center, a remote rainforest camp nestled in Ruhengeri province in the saddle of two volcanoes. For the research center's name, Fossey used "Kari" for the first four letters of Mount Karisimbi that overlooked her camp from the south, and "soke" for the last four letters of Mount Bisoke, the slopes of which rose to the north, directly behind the camp. Established 3,000 metres (9,800 ft) up Mount Bisoke, the defined study area covered 25 square kilometres (9.7 mi^{2}).

Catching sight of Fossey, villagers would cry out, Nyirmachabelli, which meant "the old lady who lives in the forest without a man". "Although my new name was pleasantly lyrical," Fossey wrote, "I would have to admit that I did not like its implications." She herself translated it as "The Lone Woman of the Forest".

Unlike the gorillas from the Congo side of the Virungas, the Karisoke area gorillas had never been partially habituated by Schaller's study; they knew humans only as poachers, and it took longer for Fossey to be able to study the Karisoke gorillas at a close distance. Fossey attempted to habituate the gorillas by copying their actions. Over time, the gorillas became accustomed to Fossey. As she explained to the BBC in 1984: "I'm an inhibited persona and I felt that the gorillas were somewhat inhibited as well, so I imitated their natural, normal behaviour like feeding, munching on celery stalks or scratching myself."

Fossey made discoveries about gorillas including how females transfer from group to group over the decades, gorilla vocalization, hierarchies and social relationships among groups, rare infanticide, gorilla diet, and how gorillas recycle nutrients. Fossey's research was funded by the Wilkie Foundation and the Leakey Home, with primary funding from the National Geographic Society.

In 1969, Fossey attempted to prevent the export of two infant gorillas, Coco and Pucker, from Rwanda to the zoo in Cologne, Germany. During the capture of the infants at the behest of the Cologne Zoo and Rwandan park conservator, 20 adult gorillas had been killed. The infant gorillas were given to Fossey by the park conservator of the Virunga Mountains for treatment of injuries suffered during their capture and captivity. With considerable effort, Fossey restored them to a semblance of health. Over her objections, the gorillas were shipped to Cologne, where they lived nine years in captivity, both dying in the same month. She viewed the holding of animals in "prison" (zoos) for the entertainment of people as unethical.

In January 1970, she appeared on the cover of National Geographic, which brought tremendous attention to her work. Most of the photographs, published in the 1970 and 1971 edition of the magazine, were taken by the English wildlife photographer and filmmaker Bob Campbell between 1968 and 1972.

Fossey was often hostile to Africans who entered into the protected area, even shooting roaming cattle.

By 1980, Fossey, who had obtained her PhD at Cambridge University in the UK, was recognized as the world's leading authority on the physiology and behavior of mountain gorillas, defining gorillas as being "dignified, highly social, gentle giants, with individual personalities, and strong family relationships." Fossey lectured as professor at Cornell University in 1981–1983. Her bestselling book Gorillas in the Mist was praised by Nikolaas Tinbergen, the Dutch ethologist and ornithologist who won the 1973 Nobel Prize in Physiology or Medicine. Her book remains the best-selling book about gorillas.

Many research students left after not being able to cope with the cold, dark, and extremely muddy conditions around Karisoke on the slopes of the Virunga Mountains, where paths usually had to be cut through six-foot-tall grass with a machete.

=== Opposition to poaching ===
While hunting had been illegal in the national park of the Virunga Mountains in Rwanda since the 1920s, the law was rarely enforced by park conservators, who were often bribed by poachers and paid a salary less than Fossey's own African staff. On three occasions, Fossey wrote that she witnessed the aftermath of the capture of infant gorillas at the behest of the park conservators for zoos; since gorillas will fight to the death to protect their young, the kidnappings would often result in up to 10 adult gorillas' deaths. Through the Digit Fund, Fossey financed patrols to destroy poachers' traps in the Karisoke study area. In four months in 1979, the Fossey patrol, consisting of four African staffers, destroyed 987 poachers' traps in the research area's vicinity. The official Rwandan national park guards, consisting of 24 staffers, did not eradicate any poachers' traps during the same period. In the eastern portion of the park not patrolled by Fossey, poachers virtually eradicated all the park's elephants for ivory and killed more than a dozen gorillas.

Fossey helped in the arrest of several poachers, some of whom served prison sentences.

According to Fossey's letters, the Rwanda Office for Tourism and National Parks, the World Wildlife Fund, African Wildlife Foundation, Fauna Preservation Society, the Mountain Gorilla Project and some of her former students tried to wrest control of the Karisoke Research Center from her for the purpose of tourism, by portraying her as unstable. In her last two years, Fossey claimed not to have lost any gorillas to poachers; however, the Mountain Gorilla Project, which was supposed to patrol the Mount Sabyinyo area, tried to cover up gorilla deaths caused by poaching and diseases transmitted through tourists. Nevertheless, these organizations received most of the public donations directed toward gorilla conservation. The public often believed their money would go to Fossey, who was struggling to finance her anti-poaching and anti-bushmeat hunting patrols, while organizations collecting in her name put it into tourism projects and, as she put it, "to pay the airfare of so-called conservationists who will never go on anti-poaching patrols in their life." Fossey described the two philosophies as her own "active conservation" or the international conservation groups' "theoretical conservation."

=== Killing of Digit and escalating tensions ===
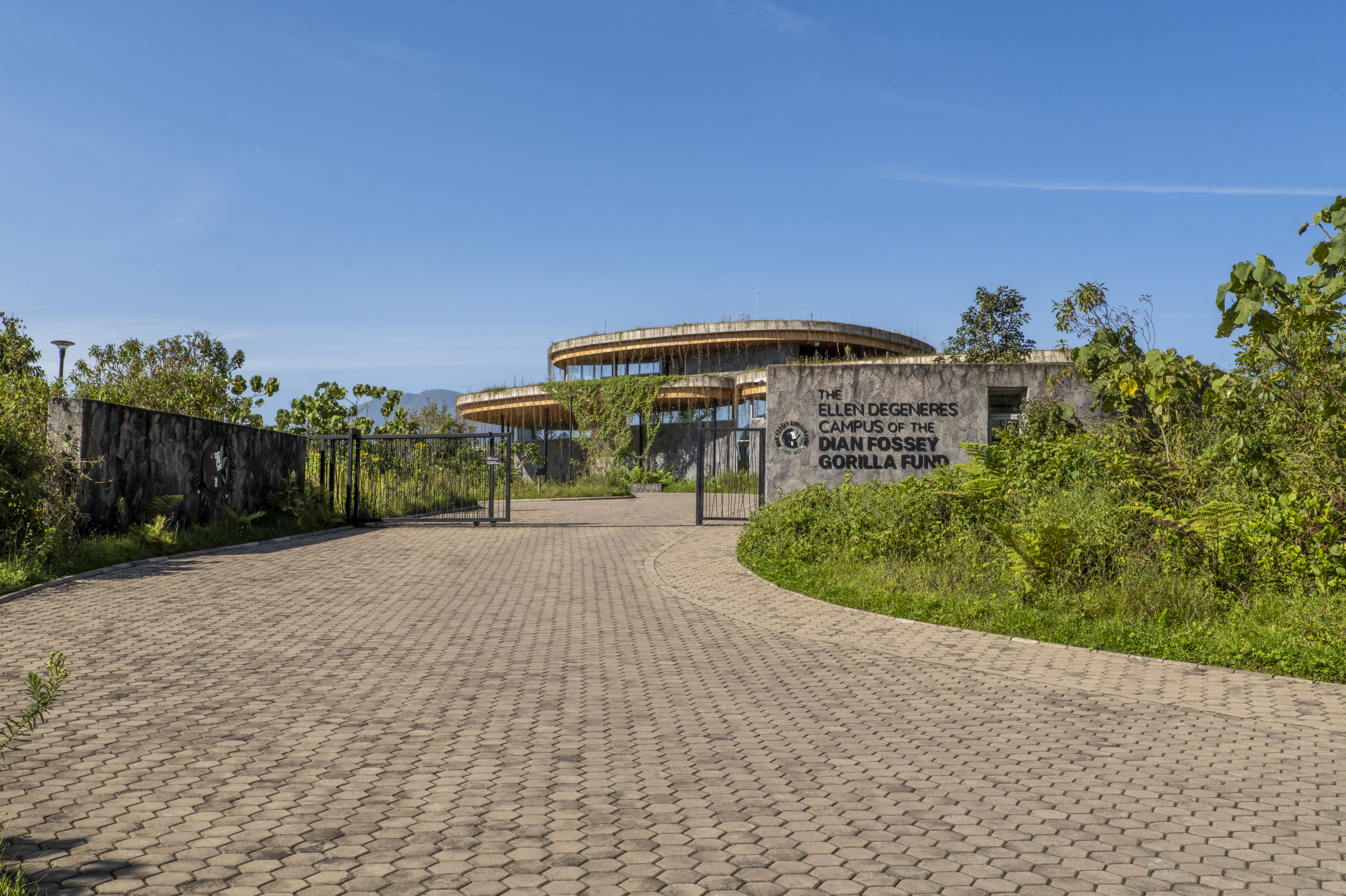
The Dian Fossey Gorilla Fund Ellen DeGeneres Campus in Rwanda

Gorillas from rival groups on the mountains that were not part of Fossey's study had often been found poached five to ten at a time, spurring Fossey to conduct her own anti-poaching patrols. Fossey's study groups had not been direct victims of poaching until sometime during the day on New Year's Eve 1977, when her favorite gorilla, Digit, was killed by poachers. As the sentry of study group 4, he defended the group against six poachers and their dogs, who ran across the gorilla study group while checking antelope traplines. Digit took five spear wounds in ferocious self-defense and managed to kill one of the poachers' dogs, allowing the other 13 members of his group to escape. Digit was decapitated, and his hands cut off for ashtrays. He was 12 years old. After his mutilated body was discovered by research assistant Ian Redmond, Fossey's group captured one of the killers. He revealed the names of his five accomplices, three of whom were later imprisoned.

Fossey later described Digit's killing as "the saddest event in all my years of sharing the daily lives of mountain gorilla." The event plunged Fossey into depression. She isolated herself in her cabin, consuming large amounts of alcohol and cigarettes.

Then, on July 24, 1978, the silverback of Digit's Group 4, named for Fossey's Uncle Bert, was shot in the heart while trying to save his son, Kweli, from being seized by poachers working with the Rwandan park conservator. Kweli's mother, Macho, was also killed in the raid. Kweli's capture was prevented by Uncle Bert's intervention, but the orphaned three-year-old was wounded by the bullet that killed his mother. He died slowly and painfully from gangrene.

"Three months after the killing of his parents, Kweli died from bullet-wound complications combined, I think, with acute depression," Fossey wrote. "He was buried between his mother and father, who lay next to Digit. All three adults, in effect, had died so that he might live." Fossey's book Gorillas in the Mist is dedicated "to the memories of Digit, Uncle Bert, Macho, and Kweli".

Fossey subsequently created the Digit Fund (now the Dian Fossey Gorilla Fund). In addition, a consortium of international gorilla funds arose to accept donations in light of Digit's death and increased attention on poaching. Fossey mostly opposed the efforts of the international organizations, which she felt inefficiently directed their funds towards more equipment for Rwandan park officials, some of whom were alleged to have ordered some of the gorilla poachings in the first place.

The deaths of some of her most studied gorillas caused Fossey to devote more of her attention to preventing poaching and less on scientific publishing and research. Fossey became more intense in protecting the gorillas and began to employ more direct tactics: she and her staff cut animal traps almost as soon as they were set; frightened, captured and humiliated the poachers; held their cattle for ransom; burnt their hunting camps and even burnt the mats from their houses. Fossey was reported to have captured and held Rwandans she suspected of poaching. She reportedly beat a poacher's testicles with stinging nettles. In a letter to a friend, she wrote, "We stripped him and spread eagled him and lashed the holy blue sweat out of him with nettle stalks and leaves..." She even reportedly kidnapped and held for ransom the child of a suspected poacher. After her murder, Fossey's National Geographic editor, Mary Smith, said that on visits to the United States, Fossey would "load up on firecrackers, cheap toys and magic tricks as part of her method to mystify the (Africans) in order to hold them at bay." She wore face-masks and pretended to practice black magic to scare away poachers.

== Murder and burial ==
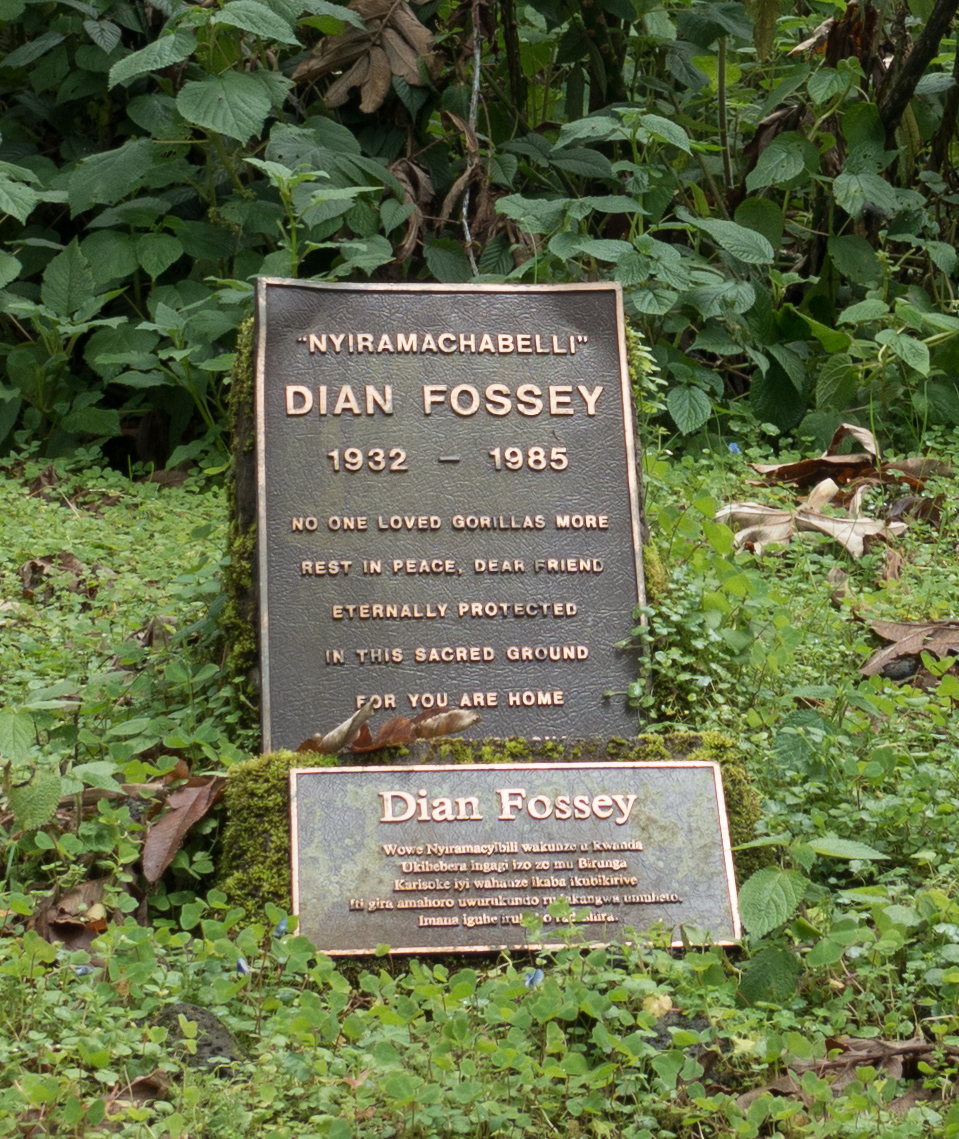
Fossey's grave at Karisoke

In the early morning of December 27, 1985, Fossey was found murdered in the bedroom of her cabin, at the far edge of the camp in the Virunga Mountains of Rwanda. Her body was lying face up near the two beds where she slept, about 7 feet (2 m) from a hole that had been cut in the wall of the cabin. Wayne Richard McGuire, Fossey's last research assistant at Karisoke, was summoned to the scene by Fossey's house servant and found her bludgeoned to death. He later said, "When I reached down to check her vital signs, I saw her face had been split, diagonally, with one machete blow." The cabin was littered with broken glass and overturned furniture, and a 9 mm handgun and ammunition lay beside her on the floor. Her cabin had been ransacked. However, robbery was evidently not the motive for the crime, for Fossey's valuables were still in the cabin, including her passport, handguns, and thousands of dollars in U.S. currency and traveler's checks.

The final entry in Fossey's journal was printed with care, in block letters, on the last page:

When you realize the value of all life, you dwell less on what is past and concentrate more on the preservation of the future.

Fossey is buried at Karisoke, at a site that she had constructed for her deceased gorilla friends. On December 31, 1985, she was buried in the gorilla graveyard next to Digit, near a grouping of wooden posts that marked the graves of 12 other gorillas. In addition to a simple graveside ceremony, memorial services were held in California, New York City and Washington, D.C.

=== Aftermath ===
After Fossey's murder, her entire staff was arrested. This included Emmanuel Rwelekana, a Rwandan tracker, who had been fired from his job after he allegedly tried to kill Fossey with a machete, according to the government's account of McGuire's trial. All were later released, except Rwelekana, who was later found dead in prison, supposedly having hanged himself.

Rwandan courts later tried and convicted Wayne McGuire in absentia for her murder. The alleged motive was that McGuire wanted to steal the manuscript of the sequel to Fossey's 1983 book, Gorillas in the Mist. At the trial, investigators said McGuire was not happy with his own research and wanted to use "any dishonest means possible" to complete his work. McGuire had returned to the United States in July 1986; because no extradition treaty existed between the U.S. and Rwanda at that time, McGuire did not return to Rwanda. His sentence, never executed, was death by shooting.

After his return to the U.S., McGuire gave a brief statement at a news conference in Century City, Los Angeles, saying Fossey had been his "friend and mentor", calling her death "tragic" and the charges "outrageous". Thereafter, McGuire was largely absent from public notice, until 2005, when news broke that he had been accepted for a job with the Health and Human Services division of the State of Nebraska. The job offer was rescinded upon discovery of his relation to the Fossey case.

Rwandan authorities also suspected that Protais Zigiranyirazo, governor of Ruhengeri Prefecture and the senior Rwandan government official attending Fossey's funeral, had ordered Fossey's murder. In 2001 he was arrested in Belgium for his alleged role in the planning of the 1994 Rwandan genocide. He was convicted in 2008 and acquitted on appeal in 2009.

Other theories about her murder persist: that the perpetrators were poachers taking revenge; that Zairian hit-men were hired to kill her for her presumably valuable research notes; that there were political motives; that she was killed by a panicked burglar, who was hired to steal a protective talisman that Fossey had taken from a poacher; that her killer was hired by a person or group whose interests would be negatively affected by Fossey's campaign to prevent exploitation of the Volcanoes National Park; that Fossey had potentially damning evidence of gold smugglers.

A will purporting to be Fossey's bequeathed all of her estate, including the proceeds from the film Gorillas in the Mist, to the Digit Fund to underwrite anti-poaching patrols. Fossey did not mention her family in the will, which was unsigned. Her mother, Hazel Fossey Price, successfully challenged the will. New York State Supreme Court Justice Swartwood threw out the will and awarded the estate to her mother, including about $4.9 million in royalties from a recent book and upcoming movie, stating that the document "was simply a draft of her purported will and not a will at all". Price said she was working on a project to preserve the work her daughter had done for the mountain gorillas in Rwanda.

== Personal life and views ==
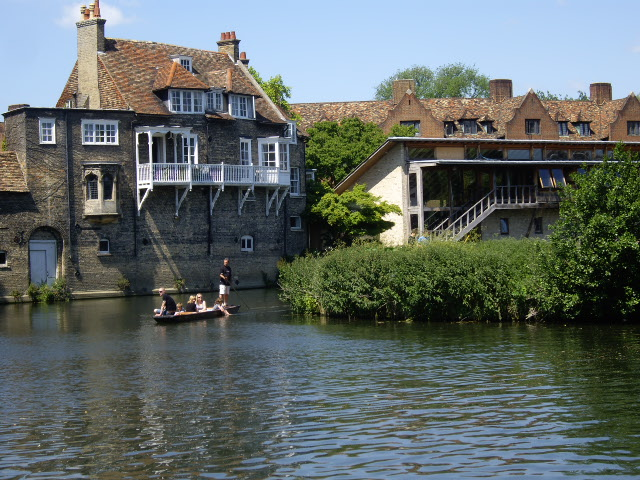
Fossey attended Darwin College at Cambridge.

During her African safari, Fossey met Alexie Forrester, the brother of a Rhodesian she had been dating in Louisville; Fossey and Forrester later became engaged. In her later years, Fossey became involved with National Geographic photographer Bob Campbell after a year of working together at Karisoke, with Campbell promising to leave his wife. Eventually, the pair grew apart through her dedication to the gorillas and Karisoke, along with his need to work further afield and on his marriage.

In 1970, studying for her Ph.D. at Darwin College, Cambridge, she discovered she was pregnant and had an abortion, later commenting that "you can't be a cover girl for National Geographic magazine and be pregnant." Fossey had other relationships throughout the years and always had a love for children.

Fossey completed her doctoral thesis and passed her oral examination at Cambridge in May 1976. "Although she had never earned a master's degree," biographer Farley Mowat wrote, "and even her B.A. in occupational therapy had no bearing on zoology, her study of the mountain gorillas of the Virungas contained such an enormous amount of new information on so many varied aspects of their lives that the examiners were pleased to confirm her doctorate. At long last she was Dr. Fossey."

Since Fossey would rescue any abused or abandoned animal she saw in Africa or near Karisoke, she acquired a menagerie in the camp, including a monkey, Kima, who lived in her cabin, and a dog, Cindy.

Fossey held Christmas parties every year for her researchers, staffers, and their families, and she developed a friendship with Jane Goodall.

=== Health ===
Fossey had been troubled by lung problems from an early age and, later in her life, developed advanced emphysema brought on by years of heavy cigarette smoking. As the debilitating disease progressed—further aggravated by the high mountain elevation and damp climate—Fossey found it increasingly difficult to conduct field research, frequently experiencing shortness of breath and requiring the help of an oxygen tank when climbing or hiking long distances.

=== Opposition to tourism ===
Fossey strongly opposed wildlife tourism, as gorillas are susceptible to human anthroponotic diseases like influenza from which they have limited immunity. Fossey reported several cases in which gorillas died because of diseases spread by tourists. She also viewed tourism as an interference into their natural wild behavior. Fossey also criticized tourist programs, often paid for by international conservation organizations, for interfering with both her research and the peace of the mountain gorillas' habitat, and was concerned that Jane Goodall was inappropriately changing her study of chimpanzees' behavior.

== Legacy ==
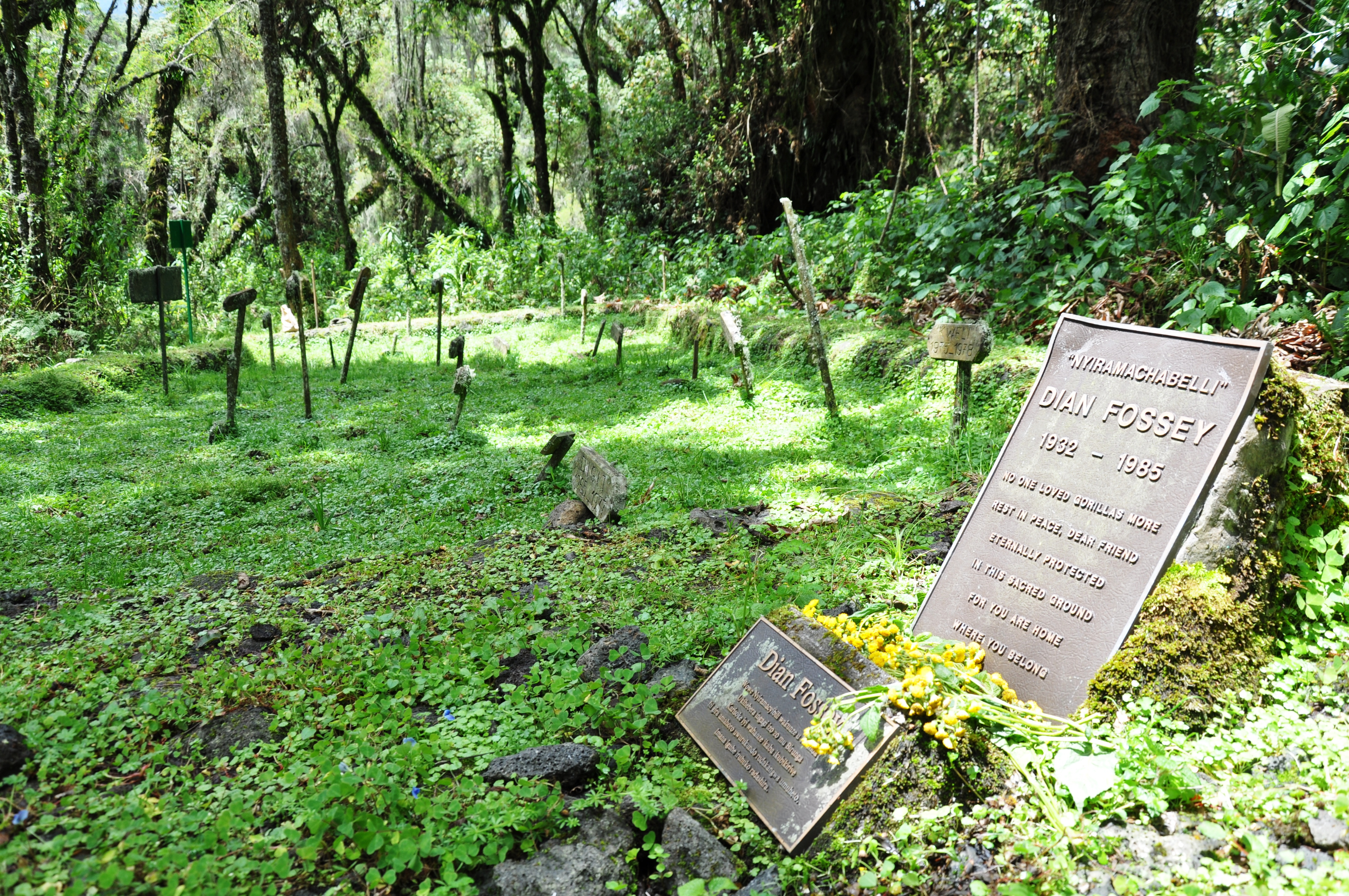
The graveyard at Karisoke

Concluding her tribute published in May 1986, Jane Goodall asked, "What was Dian's greatest contribution?"

Was it her scientific mapping of gorilla lives in the midst of their mountain home? Or was it her "active" conservation of their lives and habitat? If Dian had never gone to work in Rwanda there would be far fewer mountain gorillas than there are today. Without her protection it is quite possible that the last of them would have been killed long ago. Her grave among the graves of so many of them gives testament to the power of dedication, love, and courage. Let us hope that it also serves to make her cause our own.

After Fossey's death, the Digit Fund was renamed the Dian Fossey Gorilla Fund International. The Karisoke Research Center is now operated by the Dian Fossey Gorilla Fund from its Ellen DeGeneres Campus in Rwanda, and continues the daily gorilla monitoring and protection that Fossey started.

Fossey is generally credited with reversing the downward trend in the mountain gorilla population. Due to poaching, gorilla populations declined from 450 in 1960 to just 250 in 1981. However, Fossey's "war on poaching" saw the final confirmed killing of a gorilla in 1983. By the late 1980s, the population had risen to 280. It continues to rise, as of 1987. Fossey's research, and the following publicity, spawned "gorilla tourism".

Between Fossey's death and the 1994 Rwandan genocide, Karisoke was directed by former students, some of whom had opposed her. During the genocide and subsequent period of insecurity, the camp was completely looted and destroyed. Today only remnants are left of her cabin. During the civil war, the Virunga National Park was filled with refugees, and illegal logging destroyed vast areas.

=== In literature and media ===
The Observer, a 1968 poem by Adrienne Rich, was inspired by Dian Fossey. It was reprinted in the Winter 1983 issue of AnthroQuest, the newsletter of the L.S.B. Leakey Foundation, following an article by Fossey.

Fossey's work with the gorillas was noted by David Attenborough in his 1978 filming for the TV series Life on Earth. It was featured in the Netflix documentary A Gorilla Story: Told by David Attenborough (2026), which features the Pablo group of gorillas first seen by Fossey.

Universal Pictures bought the film rights to Gorillas in the Mist from Fossey in 1985. Warner Bros. bought the rights to "The Dark Romance of Dian Fossey", a 1986 Life magazine feature story by Harold Hayes that was expanded into a 1990 book. As a result of a legal battle between the two studios, a co-production was arranged. Portions of both works were adapted for the 1988 film Gorillas in the Mist, starring Sigourney Weaver. Fossey's book covers her scientific career in detail, omitting material on her personal life that was related in detail by Hayes after her death. In the film, Fossey's affair with photographer Bob Campbell (Bryan Brown) is a major subplot. Hayes presents Fossey as a woman obsessed with gorillas, who would stop at nothing to protect them. The film includes scenes of Fossey's ruthless dealings with poachers, including a scene in which she sets fire to a poacher's home. Weaver won a Golden Globe Award and earned an Oscar nomination for Best Actress for her performance in the film.

In Margaret Atwood's 2009 novel The Year of the Flood, Fossey is regarded as a saint by the God's Gardeners, a fictional religious sect.

In 2014, the 82nd anniversary of Fossey's birth was commemorated by a Google Doodle.

In December 2017, a three-hour TV series titled Dian Fossey: Secrets in the Mist aired on the National Geographic Channel. The series tells the story of Fossey's life, work, murder and legacy, using archive footage and still images, interviews with people who knew and worked with her, specially shot footage, and reconstruction.

In A Forest in the Clouds: My Year Among the Mountain Gorillas in the Remote Enclave of Dian Fossey (Pegasus Books, 2018) John Fowler describes Fossey's remote mountain gorilla camp, Karisoke Research Center, a few years prior to her murder, telling the story of the unraveling of Fossey's Rwandan facility as pressures mount in an effort to extricate Fossey from her domain. Fowler represents Fossey as a chain-smoking, hard-drinking woman who bullied her staff and students in her efforts to hold on to her reputation as scientist and savior of the mountain gorillas.

== See also ==
- List of animal rights advocates
- List of unsolved murders (1980–1999)
- The Trimates
  - Birutė Galdikas – Canadian primatologist and conservationist (1946–2026)
  - Jane Goodall – English primatologist (1934–2025)

== Selected bibliography ==
=== Books ===
- —— (1983). Gorillas in the Mist. Boston, Mass: Houghton Mifflin. ISBN 9780395282175. OCLC 9132014.
- —— (1972). "Living with mountain gorillas". In Allen, Thomas (ed.). The marvels of animal behavior. Washington: National Geographic Society. pp. 208–229. ISBN 9780870441059. OCLC 694851776.
- ——; Harcourt, A.H. (1977). Brock, T. H. (ed.). Primate ecology : studies of feeding and ranging behaviour in lemurs, monkeys, and apes. London New York: Academic Press. pp. 415–447. doi:10.1016/B978-0-12-176850-8.50019-6. ISBN 9780323143899. OCLC 682070368. OCLC 682070368, 7332815836.
- —— (1979). Hamburg, David A.; McCown, Elizabeth R (eds.). The Great apes. Menlo Park, Calif: Benjamin/Cummings Pub. Co. pp. 139–186. ISBN 9780805336696. OCLC 398030913.
- Fowler, John (2018). A Forest in the Clouds: My Year Among the Mountain Gorillas in the Remote Enclave of Dian Fossey. Pegasus Books. ISBN 9781681776330.

=== Scholarly articles ===
- —— (Summer 1982). "An amiable giant: Fuertes's gorilla". The Living Bird: 21–22. ISSN 0459-6137. OCLC 1783015.
- —— (1982). "Mountain gorilla research, 1974". Research Reports – National Geographic Society. 14. Washington, DC: 243–258. ISSN 0077-4626. OCLC 1586425.
- —— (1980). "Mountain gorilla research, 1971–1972". Projects. Research Reports – National Geographic Society 1971. 12. Washington, DC: 237–255. ISSN 0077-4626. OCLC 1586425.
- —— (1978). "Mountain gorilla research, 1969–1970". Projects. Research Reports – National Geographic Society 1969. 11. Washington, DC: 173–176. ISSN 0077-4626. OCLC 1586425.
- —— (1976). The Behaviour of the Mountain Gorilla (Thesis). University of Cambridge. OCLC 60364345, 500444186.
- —— (August 1974). "Observations on the home range of one group of mountain gorillas (Gorilla gorilla beringel)". Animal Behaviour. 22 (3): 568–581. Bibcode:1974AnBeh..22..568F. doi:10.1016/S0003-3472(74)80002-3. ISSN 0003-3472. OCLC 191252756.
- —— (March 1972). "Vocalizations of the mountain Gorilla (Gorilla gorilla beringei)". Animal Behaviour. 20 (1): 36–53. Bibcode:1972AnBeh..20...36F. doi:10.1016/S0003-3472(72)80171-4. ISSN 0003-3472. OCLC 191252756.
