= Mount Gahinga =

Mountain in Rwanda and Uganda

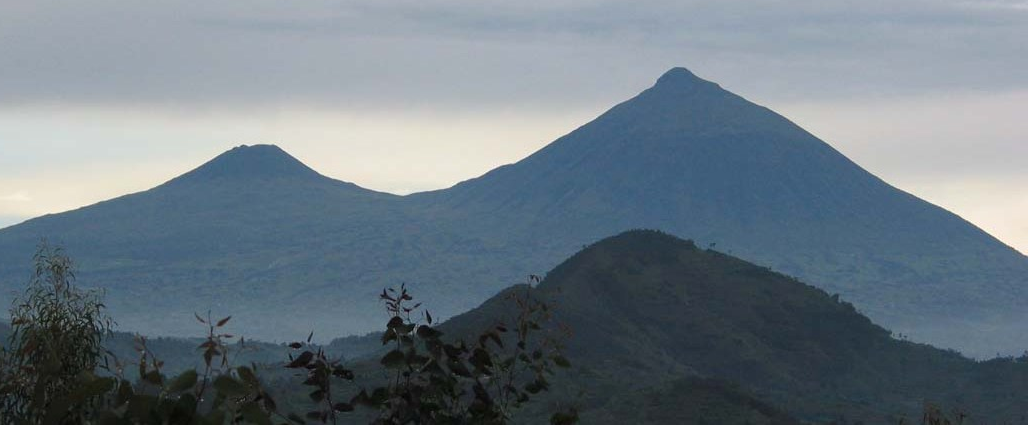
- Mts. Gahinga (left) and Muhabura (right)

Highest point
- Elevation: 3,474 m (11,398 ft)
- Prominence: 423 m (1,388 ft)
- Coordinates: 01°23′13″S 29°38′48″E (Note: See the Synonyms & Subfeatures tab on the GVP page)

Naming
- English translation: A little pile of stones
- Language of name: Kinyarwanda

Geography
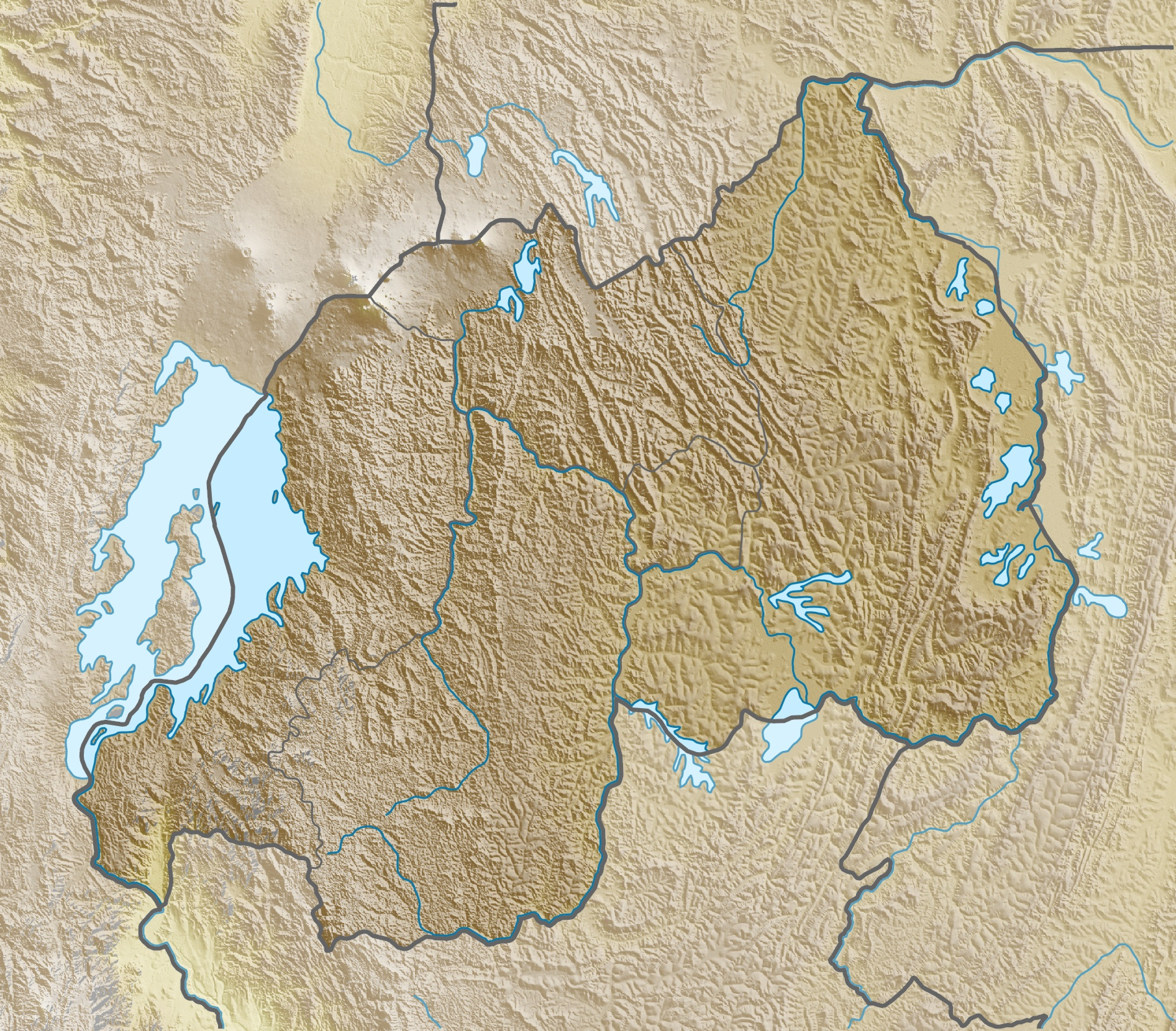
- Location within Rwanda Location within Uganda
- Location: Rwanda–Uganda
- Parent range: Virunga Mountains

Geology
- Mountain type: Stratovolcano
- Last eruption: unknown

Climbing
- Easiest route: Hike

Mount Gahinga is a dormant/extinct volcano in the Virunga Mountains on the Rwanda-Uganda border. Gahinga lies between Muhabura and Sabyinyo, but is the smallest of these three volcanoes. Mount Gahinga, also known in the local Kinyarwanda/Rufumbira dialect as "a small pile of stones", has a swampy caldera on its peak. The caldera is believed to be about 180 m (591 ft) wide. It is part of Mgahinga Gorilla National Park, a protected area that is home to different kinds of wildlife. Mgahinga Gorilla National Park got its name from this volcano. Mount Gahinga, whose elevation is 3,473 m (11,394 ft), is part of a chain of eight volcanic mountains of the Virunga Mountains. The volcano chain spans across Uganda, Rwanda and the Democratic Republic of Congo.

The vegetation across the mountain can be described as afro-montane with bamboo composing the main vegetation. Like Muhabura and Sabyinyo, the bamboo forests on Mount Gahinga are a habitat of the endangered mountain gorilla. There are several other species of animals and birds that form part of the Mount Gahinga ecosystem. The golden monkeys are notable to these.

== Geography ==
Mount Gahinga forms part of the Virunga (Mufumbiro) volcanic range, a chain of volcanoes in the Albertine Rift region where Rwanda, Uganda, and the Democratic Republic of the Congo meet. The Virunga Mountains extend for about 80 kilometres and include eight main volcanic peaks.

The Smithsonian Global Volcanism Program lists Gahinga (Mgahinga) as a cone at 1°23′13″S 29°38′48″E, with an elevation of 3,473 metres. Global Volcanism Program describes Gahinga as about 3.5 kilometres east of Muhavura (Muhabura) across a broad saddle.

== Geology ==
Global Volcanism Program places Mount Gahinga within the Albertine Rift Volcanic Province and describes the Muhavura–Gahinga volcanic area as producing basanitic-to-trachyandesitic lavas. Rock types listed for the Muhavura volcanic area include trachybasalt/tephrite-basanite and trachyandesite/basaltic trachyandesite.

Global Volcanism Program lists the last known eruption for Muhavura as unknown and reports no known Holocene eruptions from Muhavura.

== Ecology ==
On the Ugandan slopes, Mount Gahinga rises through montane forest into a bamboo zone. The bamboo zone supports the endangered golden monkey, a primate restricted to bamboo forests in the Virunga range. The same landscape supports the endangered mountain gorilla across the wider Virunga Conservation Area.

== Protection and tourism ==
Mount Gahinga lies on the protected slopes of Mgahinga Gorilla National Park (Uganda) and Volcanoes National Park (Rwanda). Uganda Wildlife Authority describes Mgahinga Gorilla National Park as Uganda’s smallest national park (33.7 km²), established as a national park in 1991 after earlier protection status in the area.

Uganda Wildlife Authority describes volcano climbing in Mgahinga Gorilla National Park as a day hike, with Mount Gahinga leading to a bamboo-covered summit and a swamp-filled crater about 180 metres wide.

== Etymology ==
Uganda Wildlife Authority describes the name “Gahinga” as meaning “small pile of stones” in the local language, linked to stone cairns piled by farmers clearing boulder-strewn land.

== See also ==
- Mgahinga Gorilla National Park
- Mount Moroto
- Mount Muhabura
- Mount Sabyinyo
