= Gorillas in the Mist =

1988 film by Michael Apted

- Theatrical release poster
- Directed by: Michael Apted
- Screenplay by: Anna Hamilton Phelan
- Story by: Anna Hamilton Phelan; Tab Murphy
- Based on: Gorillas in the Mist by Dian Fossey
- Produced by: Arne Glimcher; Terence A. Clegg
- Starring: Sigourney Weaver; Bryan Brown
- Cinematography: John Seale
- Edited by: Stuart Baird
- Music by: Maurice Jarre
- Production company: The Guber-Peters Company
- Distributed by: Universal Pictures (United States and Canada); Warner Bros. Pictures (International)
- Release dates: September 14, 1988 (Premiere); September 23, 1988 (United States)
- Running time: 129 minutes
- Country: United States
- Language: English
- Budget: $22 million
- Box office: $61.1 million

Gorillas in the Mist (Note: Also known as Gorillas in the Mist: The Adventure of Dian Fossey.) is a 1988 American biographical drama film directed by Michael Apted from a screenplay by Anna Hamilton Phelan and a story by Phelan and Tab Murphy. The film is based on a book of the same name by Dian Fossey and from articles by Harold T. P. Hayes, and Alex Shoumatoff of Vanity Fair. It stars Sigourney Weaver as naturalist Dian Fossey and Bryan Brown as photographer Bob Campbell. It tells the story of Fossey, who came to Africa to study the vanishing mountain gorillas, and later fought to protect them.

The film was theatrically released in the United States by Universal Pictures and internationally by Warner Bros. Pictures on September 23, 1988. At the 61st Academy Awards, it earned five nominations, including Best Actress for Weaver and Best Writing, Screenplay Based on Material from Another Medium. The film won Best Actress in a Motion Picture – Drama for Weaver and Best Original Score for Jarre at the 46th Golden Globe Awards, where it was also nominated for Best Motion Picture – Drama.

== Plot ==
Occupational therapist Dian Fossey is inspired by anthropologist Louis Leakey to devote her life to the study of primates. She writes ceaselessly to Leakey for a job cataloging and studying the rare mountain gorillas of Africa. Following him to a lecture in Louisville, Kentucky in 1966, she convinces him of her conviction.

They travel to the Congo, where Leakey and his foundation equip her to make contact with the gorillas, and introduce her to a local animal tracker, Sembagare. Settling deep in the jungle, Fossey and Sembagare locate a troop of gorillas, but are displaced by the events of the Congo Crisis and forcibly evicted from their research site by Congolese soldiers, who accuse Fossey of being a foreign spy.

Fossey is resigned to returning to the United States, but Sembagare and her temporary host Rosamond Carr motivate her to stay in Africa. Fossey establishes new research efforts in the jungles of neighboring Rwanda, where rampant poaching becomes apparent when she discovers several traps near her new base at Karisoke. Nevertheless, Fossey and her colleagues make headway with the gorillas, taking account of their communication and social groups. Her work impresses Leakey and gains international attention.

National Geographic, which funds her efforts, dispatches photographer Bob Campbell to highlight her research. Fossey, initially unreceptive, grows increasingly attached to Campbell after several photo sessions with the gorillas, and the two become lovers, in spite of Campbell's marriage. Campbell proposes to divorce his wife and marry Fossey but insists that she would have to spend time away from Karisoke and her gorillas, leading her to end their relationship. Fossey forms an emotional bond with a gorilla named Digit, and attempts to prevent the export of other gorillas by trader Van Vecten.

Appalled by the poaching of the gorillas, Fossey complains to the Rwandan government and is dismissed, but a government minister promises to hire an anti-poaching squad. Fossey's frustrations reach a climax when Digit is beheaded by poachers. She leads numerous anti-poaching patrols, burns down the poachers' villages, and even stages a mock execution of one of the offenders, serving to alienate some of her research assistants and gaining her various enemies. Sembagare expresses concern at Fossey's opposition to the emergent industry of gorilla tourism, but she nonchalantly dismisses his worries.

On Boxing Day, 1985, Fossey is murdered in the bedroom of her cabin by an assassin with a machete. At a funeral attended by Sembagare, Carr, and others, she is buried in the same cemetery where Digit and other gorillas had been laid to rest. Sembagare symbolically links the graves of Fossey and Digit with stones as a sign that their souls rest in peace together before leaving.

An epilogue text explains that Fossey's actions helped save the gorillas from extinction, while her death remains a mystery.

== Cast ==
- Sigourney Weaver as Dian Fossey
- Bryan Brown as Bob Campbell
- Julie Harris as Roz Carr
- John Omirah Miluwi as Sembagare
- Iain Cuthbertson as Dr. Louis Leakey
- Constantin Alexandrov as Van Vecten
- Waigwa Wachira as Mukara
- Iain Glen as Brendan
- David Lansbury as Larry
- Maggie O'Neill as Kim
- Konga Mbandu as Rushemba
- Michael J. Reynolds as Howard Dowd
- Gordon Masten as the Photographer
- Peter Nduati as Batwa chief
- Helen Fraser as Mme. Van Vecten
- John Alexander as Digit
- Peter Elliott as Simba
- Denise Cheshire as Mime Artist
- Antonio Hoyos as Mime Artist
- Jody St. Michael as Mime Artist

== Release ==
Gorillas in the Mist had its world premiere in New York City on September 14, 1988 and a premiere in Los Angeles on September 19. It started an exclusive run on 15 screens in the United States on September 23, 1988.

== Reception ==
=== Box office ===
Gorillas in the Mist grossed $366,925 in its opening weekend. It expanded to 558 screens the following weekend and was the number one film for the weekend with a gross of $3,451,230. The film went on to gross $24,720,479 in the United States and Canada and $36,429,000 internationally for a worldwide total of $61,149,479.

=== Critical response ===
The film received generally positive reviews from critics, with many praising both Weaver's performance and the technical accomplishments of the movie while some were frustrated by the lack of depth in Fossey's on-screen characterization. On the review aggregator website Rotten Tomatoes, 84% of 19 critics' reviews are positive, with an average rating of 6.7/10.

Hal Hinson of The Washington Post declared, "At last, [Weaver] may have found a part cut to her scale", adding "it's a great role for her to pour herself into, and she doesn't skimp." However, he had his misgivings about the restrictions placed on Fossey's character: "The chief problem with Gorillas in the Mist is that it banalizes its heroine; it turns her into one of us. And by all accounts Fossey was anything but ordinary." He also accused the filmmakers of toning down Fossey's unstable mental state: "Fossey was more than merely eccentric...The movie hints at these aspects of her character but tries to soften them;...the filmmakers have done more than sanitize Fossey's life, they've deprived it of any meaning." Hinson concluded that "Gorillas in the Mist isn't a terrible film, but it is a frustrating one."

While Roger Ebert was also happy with the casting of Weaver as Fossey ("It is impossible to imagine a more appropriate choice for the role"), he felt the character was too distanced from the audience and that her development and motives were unclear. He wrote that the film "tells us what Dian Fossey accomplished and what happened to her, but it doesn't tell us who she was, and at the end that's what we want to know." However, Ebert was impressed by the scenes with the gorillas and the way live footage of gorillas was seamlessly blended with gorilla costumes by Rick Baker: "Everything looked equally real to me, and the delicacy with which director Michael Apted developed the relationships between woman and beast was deeply absorbing. There were moments when I felt a touch of awe. Those moments, which are genuine, make the movie worth seeing." Hinson also agreed that "whenever the cameras turn on the gorillas — who are the film's true stars — you feel you're witnessing something truly great."

=== Accolades ===
Award	Category	Recipient(s)	Result
Academy Awards	Best Actress	Sigourney Weaver	Nominated
Academy Awards	Best Screenplay – Based on Material from Another Medium	Anna Hamilton Phelan and Tab Murphy	Nominated
Academy Awards	Best Film Editing	Stuart Baird	Nominated
Academy Awards	Best Original Score	Maurice Jarre	Nominated
Academy Awards	Best Sound	Andy Nelson, Brian Saunders, and Peter Handford	Nominated
British Academy Film Awards	Best Cinematography	John Seale	Nominated
Chicago Film Critics Association Awards	Best Actress	Sigourney Weaver	Nominated
Genesis Awards	Best Feature Film		Won
Golden Globe Awards	Best Motion Picture – Drama		Nominated
Golden Globe Awards	Best Actress in a Motion Picture – Drama	Sigourney Weaver	Won (Note: Tied with Jodie Foster for The Accused and Shirley MacLaine for Madame Sousatzka.)
Golden Globe Awards	Best Original Score – Motion Picture	Maurice Jarre	Won
Golden Reel Awards	Best Sound Editing – Foreign Feature		Won
Jupiter Awards	Best International Actress	Sigourney Weaver	Won
Jupiter Awards	Best International Film	Michael Apted	Nominated
National Board of Review Awards	Top Ten Films		9th place
Writers Guild of America Awards	Best Screenplay – Based on Material from Another Medium	Anna Hamilton Phelan and Tab Murphy	Nominated

== See also ==
- Gorillas in Our Midst
