= Karisoke Research Center =

Institute in Rwanda's Volcanoes National Park

Coordinates: 1.4736°S 29.4854°E

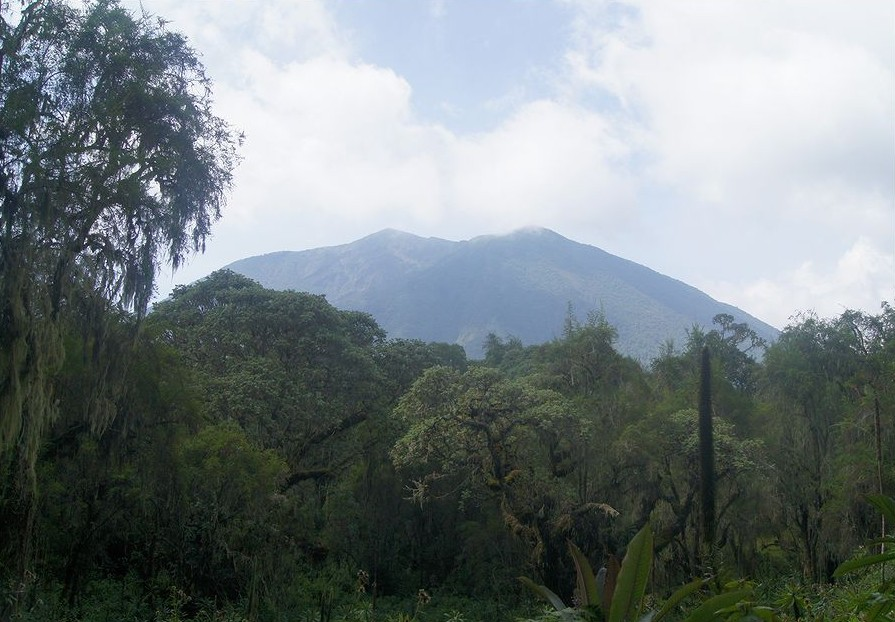
Mount Bisoke

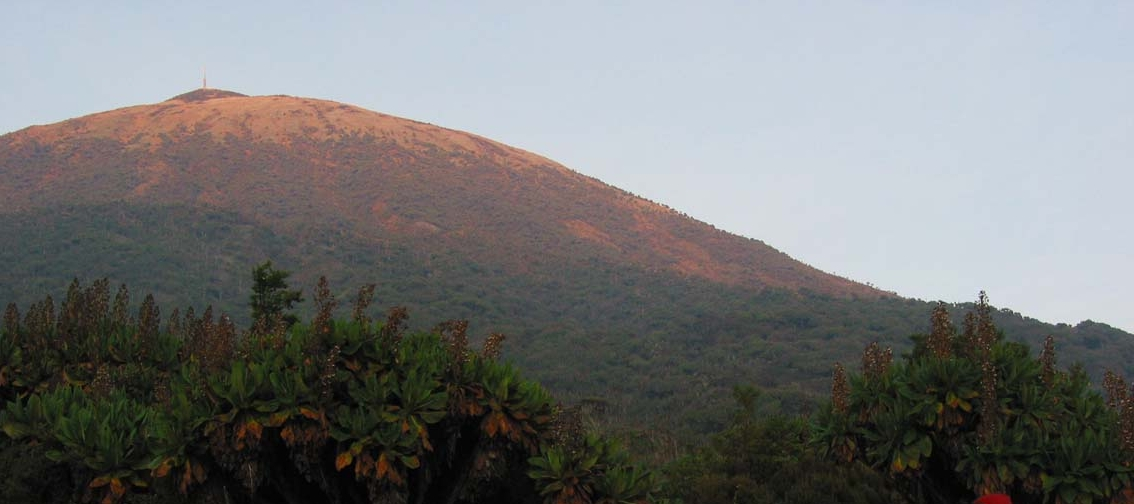
Mount Karisimbi

The Karisoke Research Center was nestled in an area between Mount Bisoke (to the north) and Mount Karisimbi (to the south).

The Karisoke Research Center is a research institute in Rwanda's Volcanoes National Park. It was founded by Dian Fossey on 24 September 1967 to study endangered mountain gorillas. Fossey located the camp in Rwanda's Virunga volcanic mountain range, between Mount Karisimbi and Mount Bisoke, and named it by combining the names of the two mountains.

After Fossey's murder in December 1985, she was interred in the grounds of the institute. The camp subsequently continued to function under the auspices of the Dian Fossey Gorilla Fund. In 2022, the Karisoke Research Center moved to the Ellen DeGeneres Campus of the Dian Fossey Gorilla Fund in Rwanda.

At the time Fossey founded Karisoke, she feared that the mountain gorilla might become extinct by the end of the 20th century, as her mentor, Dr. Louis Leakey, had warned. A census published in 1981 found that the population had fallen to 242 individuals, from a 1960 estimate of 400–500. A census completed in 2016 showed 604 mountain gorillas known to inhabit the Virunga mountains, a significant increase. Karisoke survived Fossey's murder in 1985 as well as years of civil strife and also expanded tremendously over the past few decades.

Due to intensive protection, the mountain gorillas of the Virungas are the only great ape species to have increased in number in recent decades.

The Dian Fossey Gorilla Fund and the Rwanda Development Board conduct extensive daily protection and monitoring of the mountain gorillas, numerous science and research projects, various education initiatives, and community health and development projects. Since its establishment in 1967, Karisoke has also continued scientific monitoring of the mountain gorillas and their habitat and attracts scientists and science students from around the world.

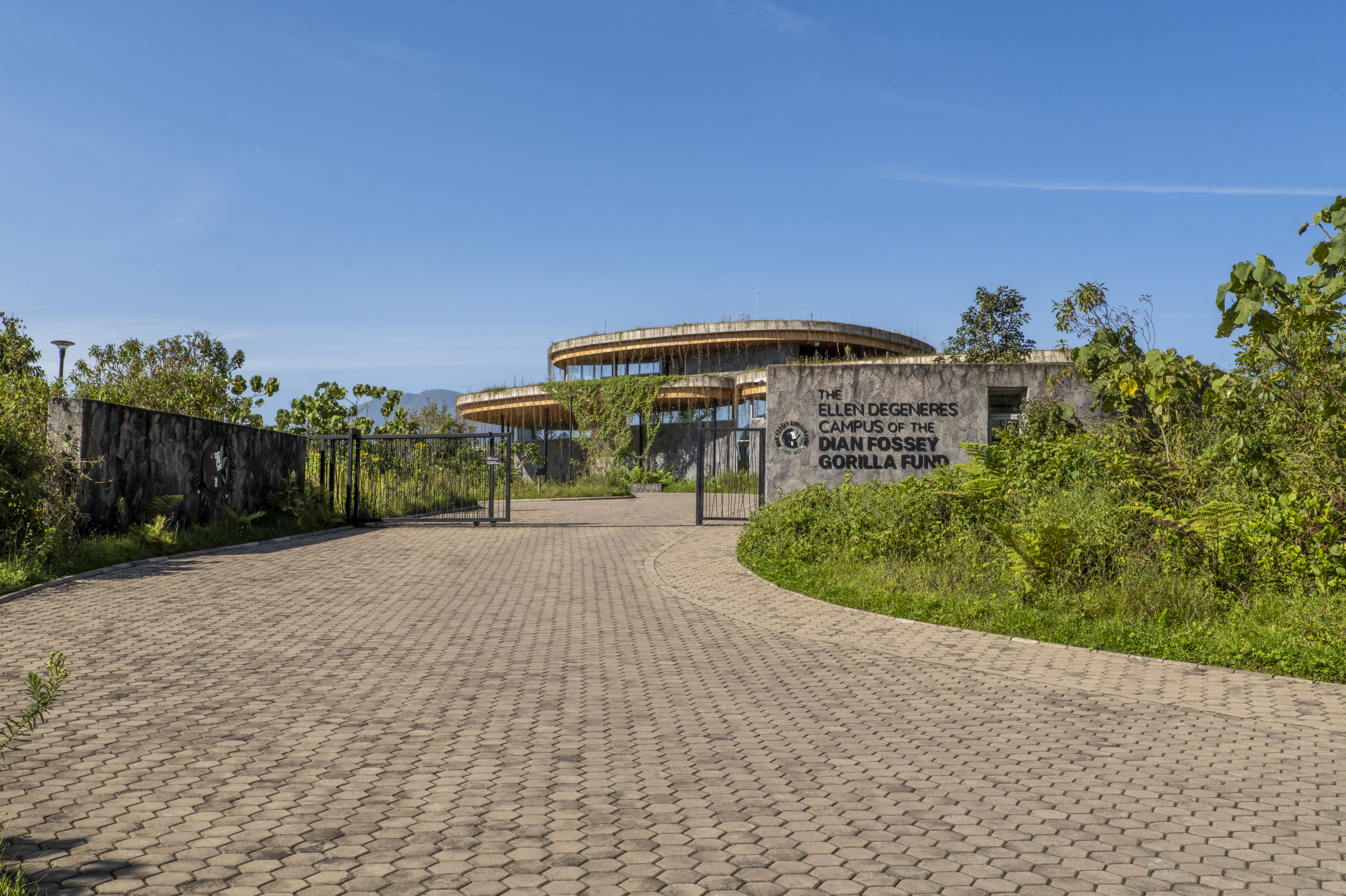
The Dian Fossey Gorilla Fund's Ellen DeGeneres Campus

The Ellen DeGeneres Campus of the Dian Fossey Gorilla Fund was opened in 2022 as a permanent, specially designed facility for gorilla conservation.

== Bibliography ==
- Martha M. Robbins; Pascale Sicotte; Kelly J. Stewart (2001). Mountain Gorillas: Three Decades of Research at Karisoke. Cambridge University Press. ISBN 0-521-78004-7.
