= Mount Bisoke =

Volcano in the Virunga mountains

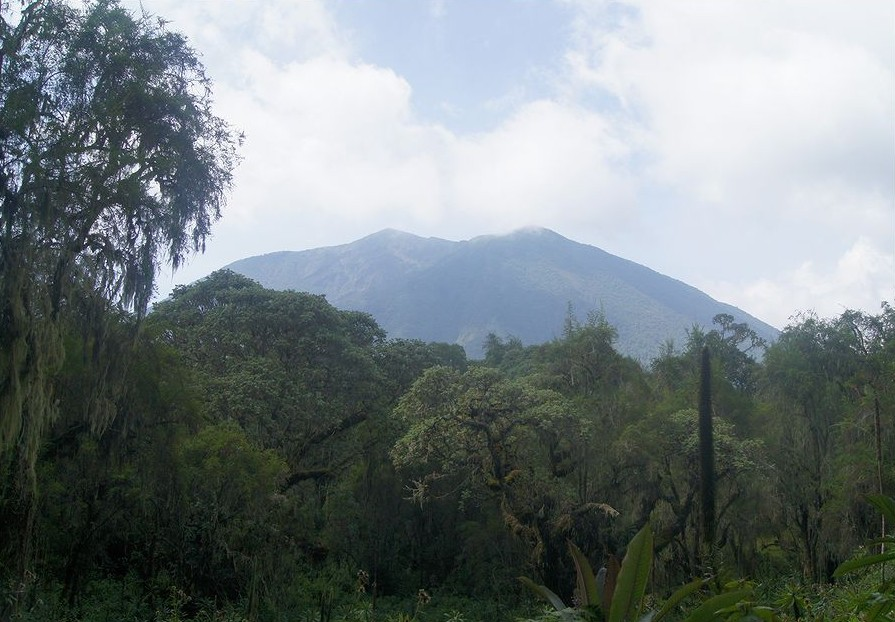
- Mount Bisoke

Highest point
- Elevation: 3,711 m (12,175 ft)
- Prominence: 581 m (1,906 ft)
- Coordinates: 1°27′39″S 29°28′54″E

Geography
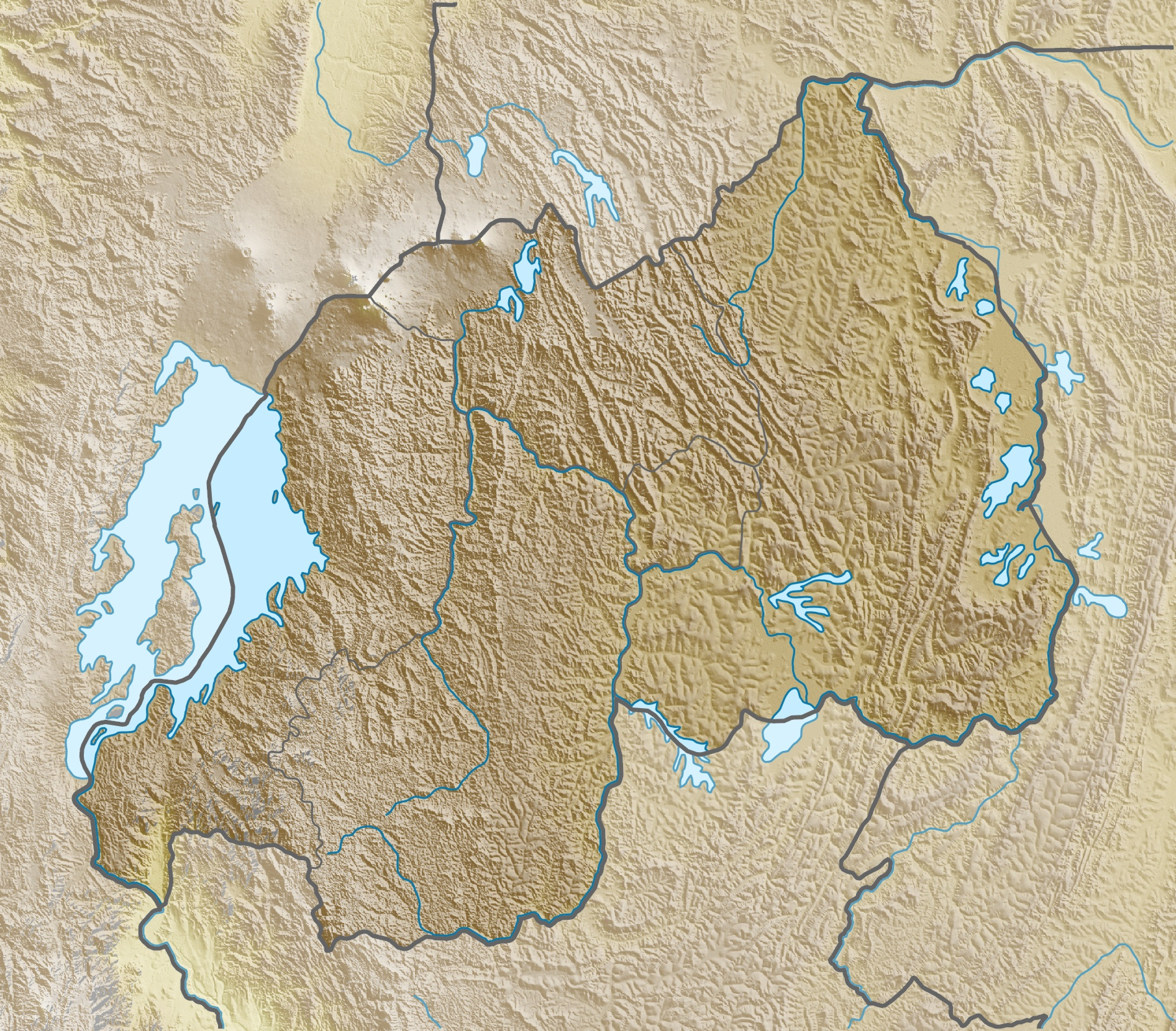
- Location within Rwanda Location within Democratic Republic of the Congo
- Location: Rwanda / Democratic Republic of the Congo
- Parent range: Virunga Mountains

Geology
- Formed by: Volcanism along the Albertine Rift
- Mountain type: Stratovolcano
- Last eruption: August 1957

Mount Bisoke (also Visoke) is an active stratovolcano in the Virunga Mountains of the Albertine Rift, the western branch of the East African Rift. It straddles the border of Rwanda and the Democratic Republic of the Congo, but the summit is located in Rwanda. It is located approximately 35 km northeast of the town of Goma and the adjacent Lake Kivu.

== Geology ==
Bisoke, like all the peaks in the Virunga Mountain Range, is a volcano created by rift action on the forming divergent boundary of the East African Rift which is slowly bisecting the African Plate. Bisoke has two recorded eruptions which happened in 1891 and 1957. The most recent eruption happened 11 km north of the summit, and it formed two small cones on the volcano's north flank. There is evidence that the area where this eruption occurred is still geologically active, suggesting the likelihood of future activity at Bisoke. The volcano has two crater lakes, one being the largest of the range.

== Geography ==
The mountain is within the Rwandan Volcanoes National Park and the Congolese Virunga National Park. The steep slopes of the peak are densely covered with equatorial rainforest and alpine meadows. The summit does not gather snow, but is often shrouded in fog. Bisoke is one of the mountains that provide habitat for the endangered mountain gorilla, and the Karisoke Research Center founded by Dian Fossey is in the valley to the west.

== Industry/Tourism ==
Being within two national parks, it is by law off-limits to most standard wilderness industries such as logging, farming, or mining. Aside from visitors to the parks searching for gorillas or other wildlife, the peak is popular with mountaineers. It can be climbed in a day from the Rwandan side, and the Rwanda Development Board (RDB) leads two-day excursions to it and nearby Mount Karisimbi, most often out of the nearby city of Ruhengeri. The climb is considered steep but walkable.

The local tourism industry was devastated during the 1990s by several bloody uprisings and wars in central Africa including the Rwandan Civil War (1990–1994), Rwandan genocide (1994), First Congo War (1996–1997) and Second Congo War (1998–2003), and Burundian Civil War (1993–2005). During this time, military action and refugee relocation wreaked ecological havoc (including deforestation and poaching of endangered species) upon the Volcanoes and Virunga National Parks and the surrounding area. In recent years, both parks have been somewhat secured, and the tourism industry of the area has been recovering, despite ongoing conflicts and, from 2020-2022, the damage caused by COVID-19 lockdowns.
