= Mount Karisimbi =

Volcano in Africa

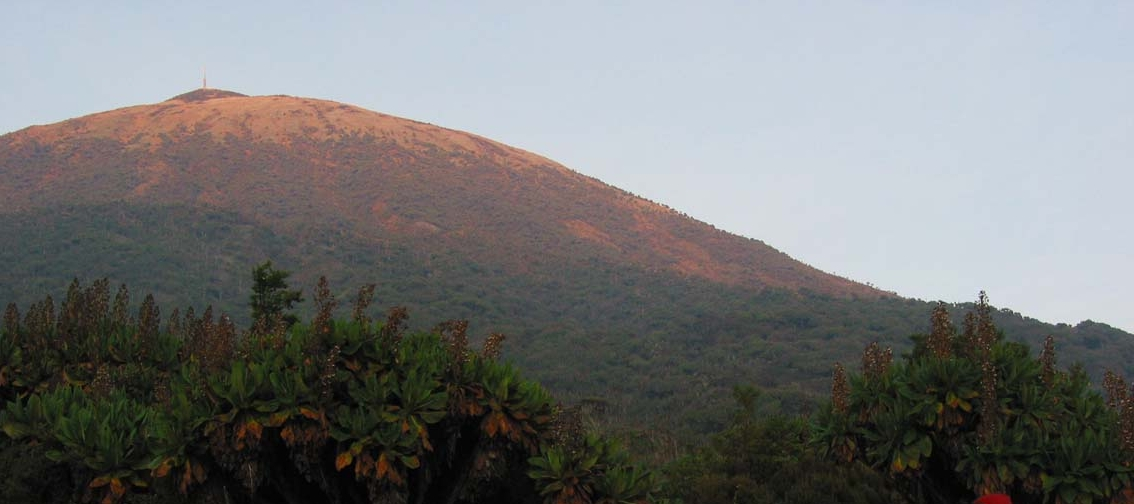
- Karisimbi summit seen from the campsite in 2005

Highest point
- Elevation: 4,507 m (14,787 ft)
- Prominence: 3,312 m (10,866 ft); Ranked 61st
- Listing: Country high point Ultra; Ribu
- Coordinates: 1°30′30″S 29°26′42″E

Geography
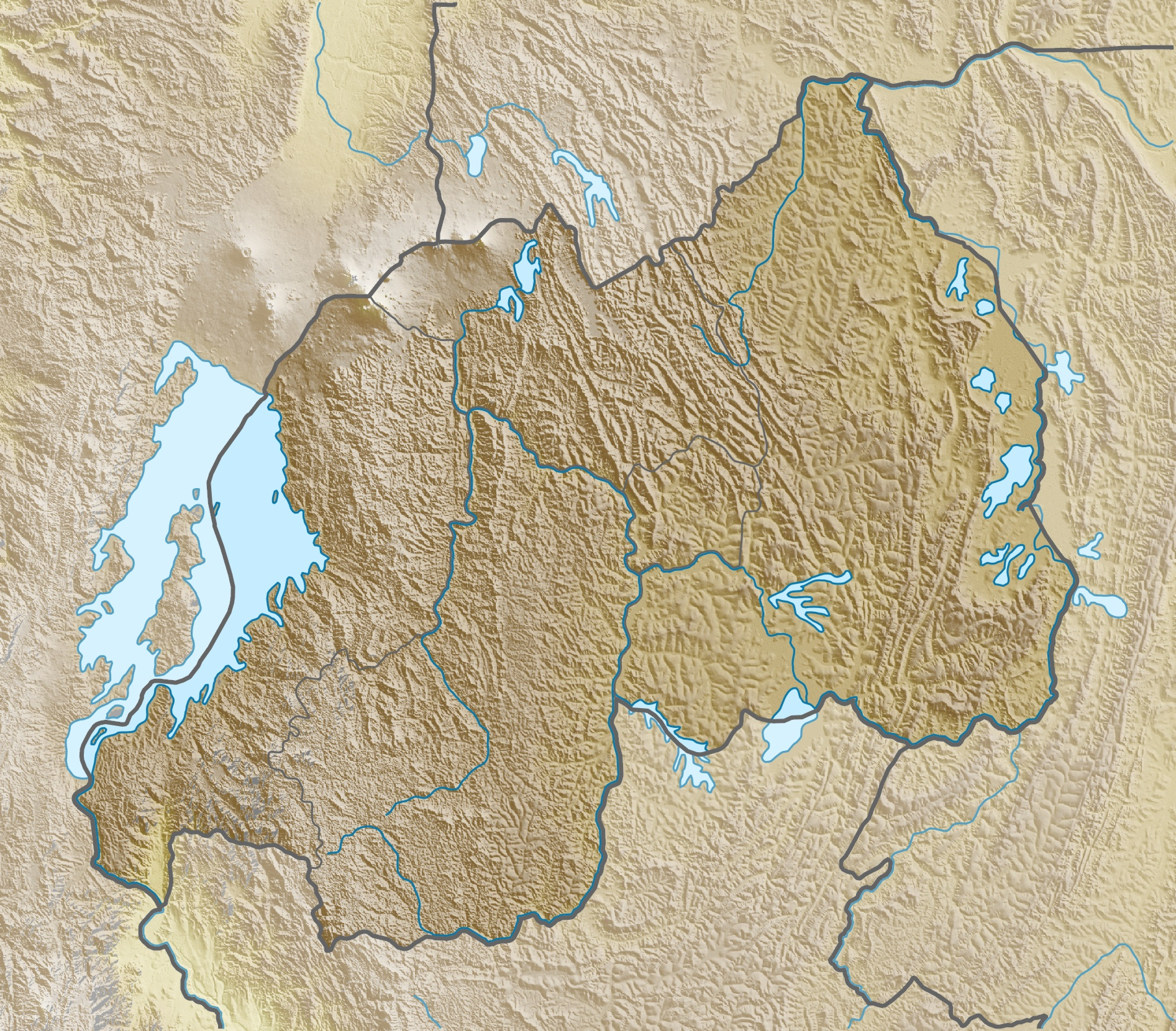
- Location within Rwanda
- Location: Democratic Republic of the Congo - Rwanda border
- Parent range: Virunga Mountains

Geology
- Formed by: Volcanism along the Albertine Rift
- Mountain type: Stratovolcano
- Last eruption: 8050 BCE (?)

Mount Karisimbi is a stratovolcano in the Virunga Mountains on the border between Rwanda and the Democratic Republic of Congo. At 4,507 metres (14,787 ft), Karisimbi is the highest of the eight major mountains of the mountain range, which is a part of Albertine Rift, the western branch of the East African Rift. Karisimbi is flanked by Mikeno to the north, Bisoke to the east and Nyiragongo to the west, on the other side of the Rift Valley. Karisimbi is the 11th highest mountain of Africa and ranked 61st by prominence.

The name Karisimbi comes from the word 'amasimbi', which means snow in the local Kinyarwanda language. Snow can mostly be found during the dry season in June, July and August on the top of the volcano.

Between Karisimbi and Bisoke is the Karisoke Research Center, which was founded by Dian Fossey in order to observe the mountain gorillas living in this area.

== History ==
On February 27, 1908, an expedition led by Egon Von Kirschstein was coming down the Branca Crater when a hailstorm and snowstorm caused twenty of the expedition's porters to perish.

In May 2010, a series of non-volcanic mudflows triggered by rain occurred along the volcano's western flank. The mudflows carried volcanic rocks and vegetation debris downhill. At Kibiriga, the mudflows caused severe damage and killed at least 50 people.

== See also ==
- List of volcanoes in Rwanda
- List of Ultras of Africa
