= Virunga Mountains =

Chain of volcanoes in East Africa

Coordinates: 01°25′45″S 29°32′54″E

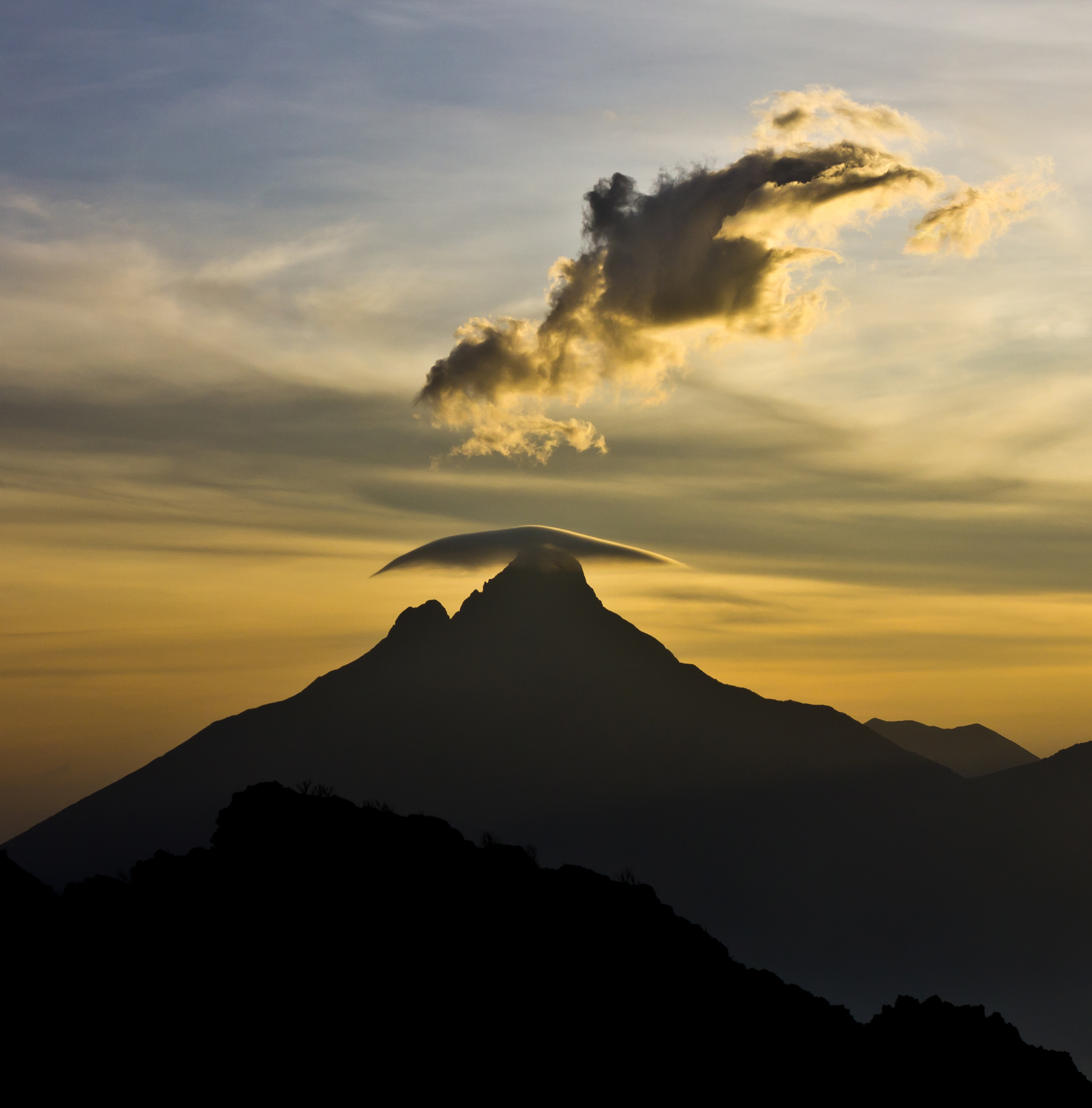
- The summit of Mount Mikeno

Highest point
- Peak: Mount Karisimbi
- Elevation: 4,507 m (14,787 ft)

Dimensions
- Length: 80 km (50 mi)

Geography
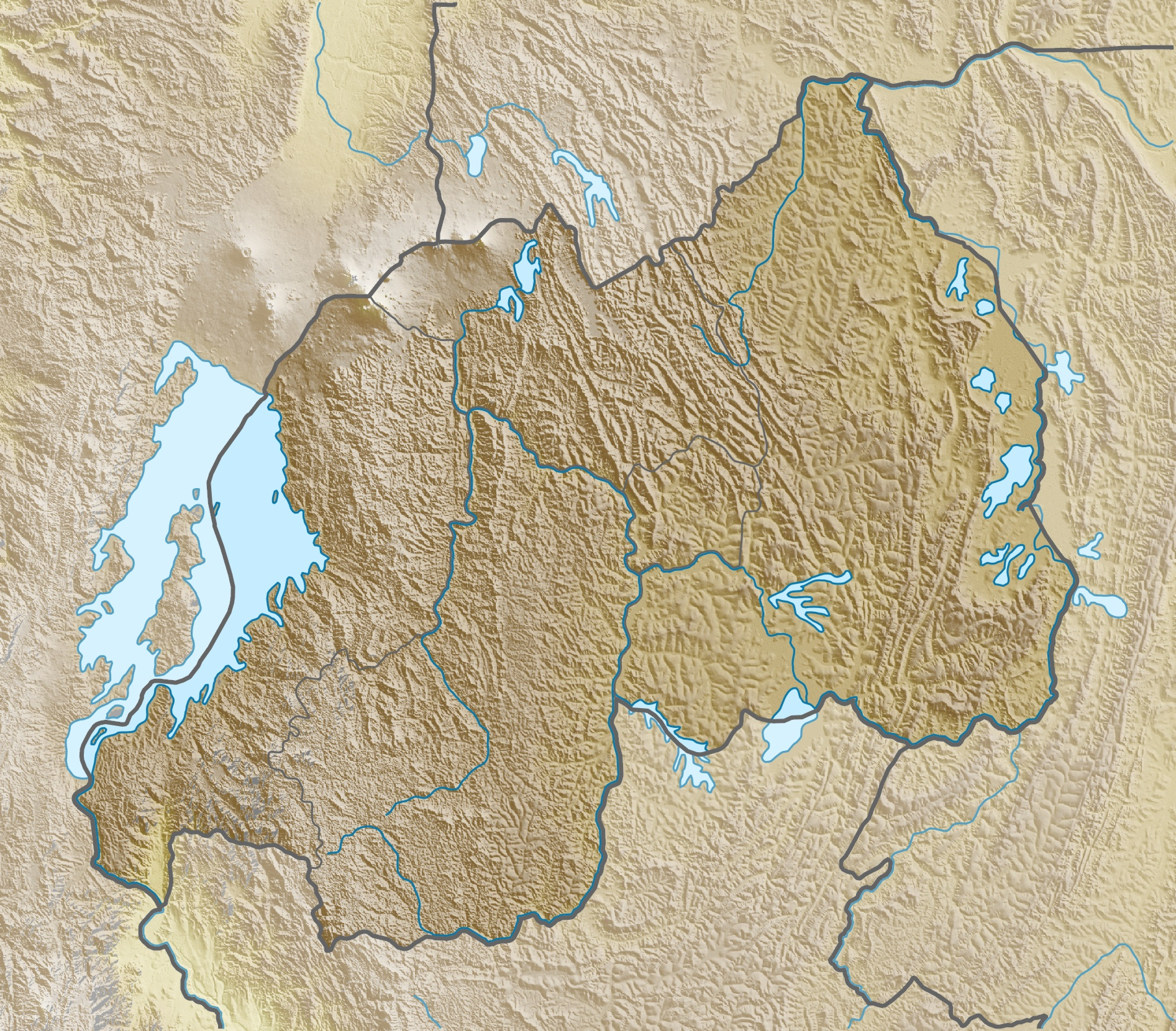
- Location within Democratic Republic of the Congo Location within Uganda Location within Rwanda

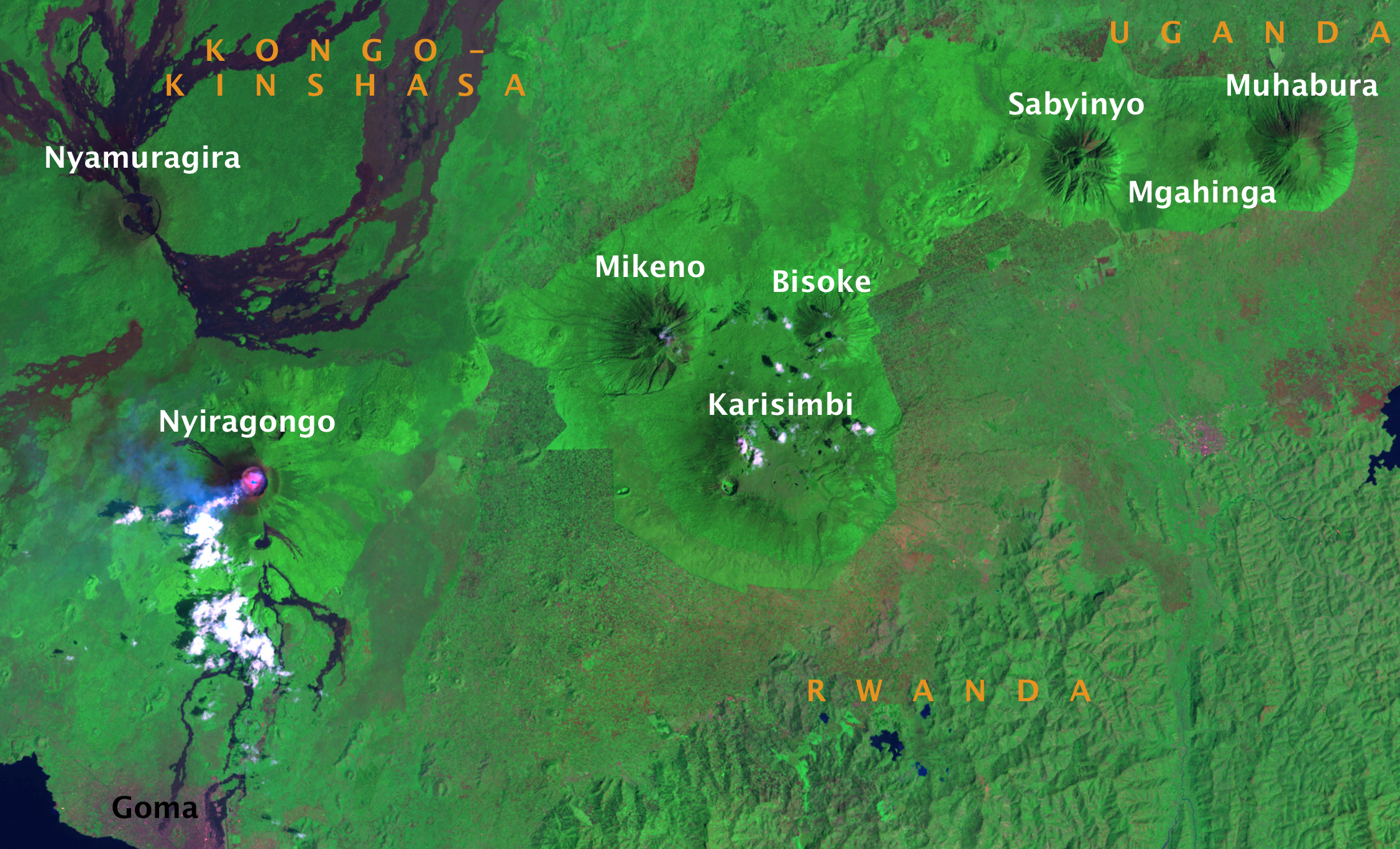
- Countries: Democratic Republic of the Congo; Rwanda; Uganda

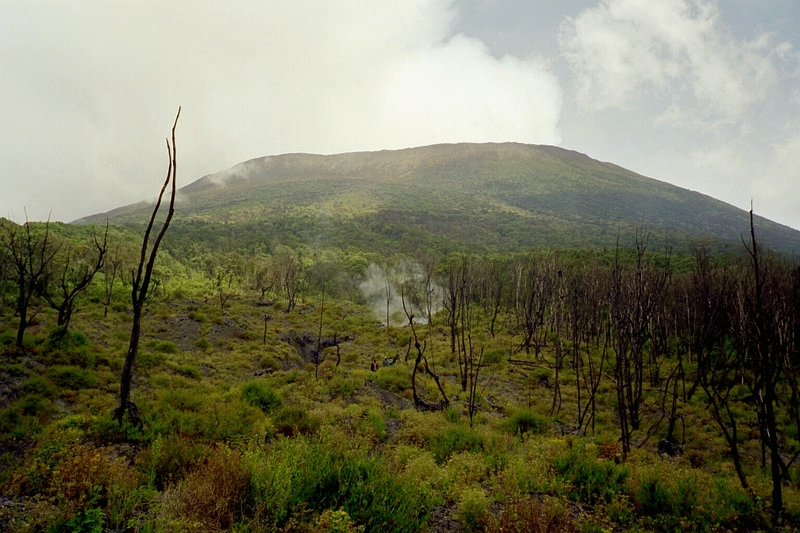
Mount Nyiragongo

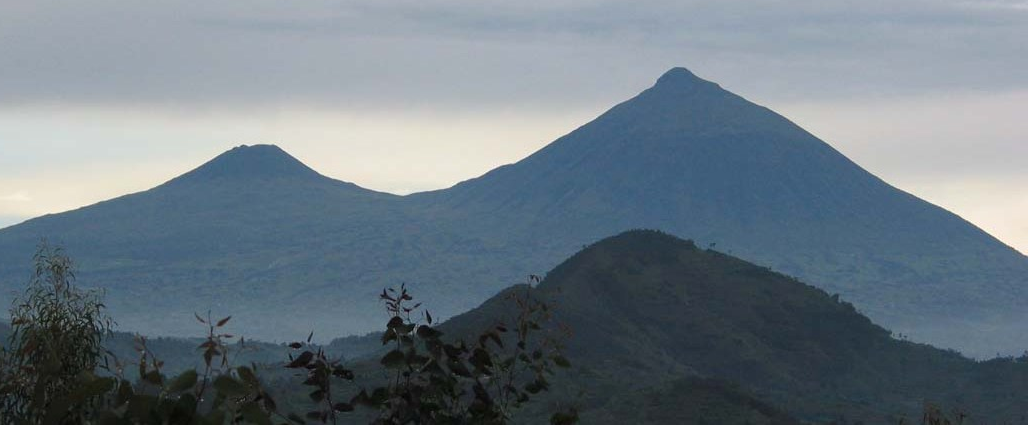
Gahinga (left) and Muhabura (right)

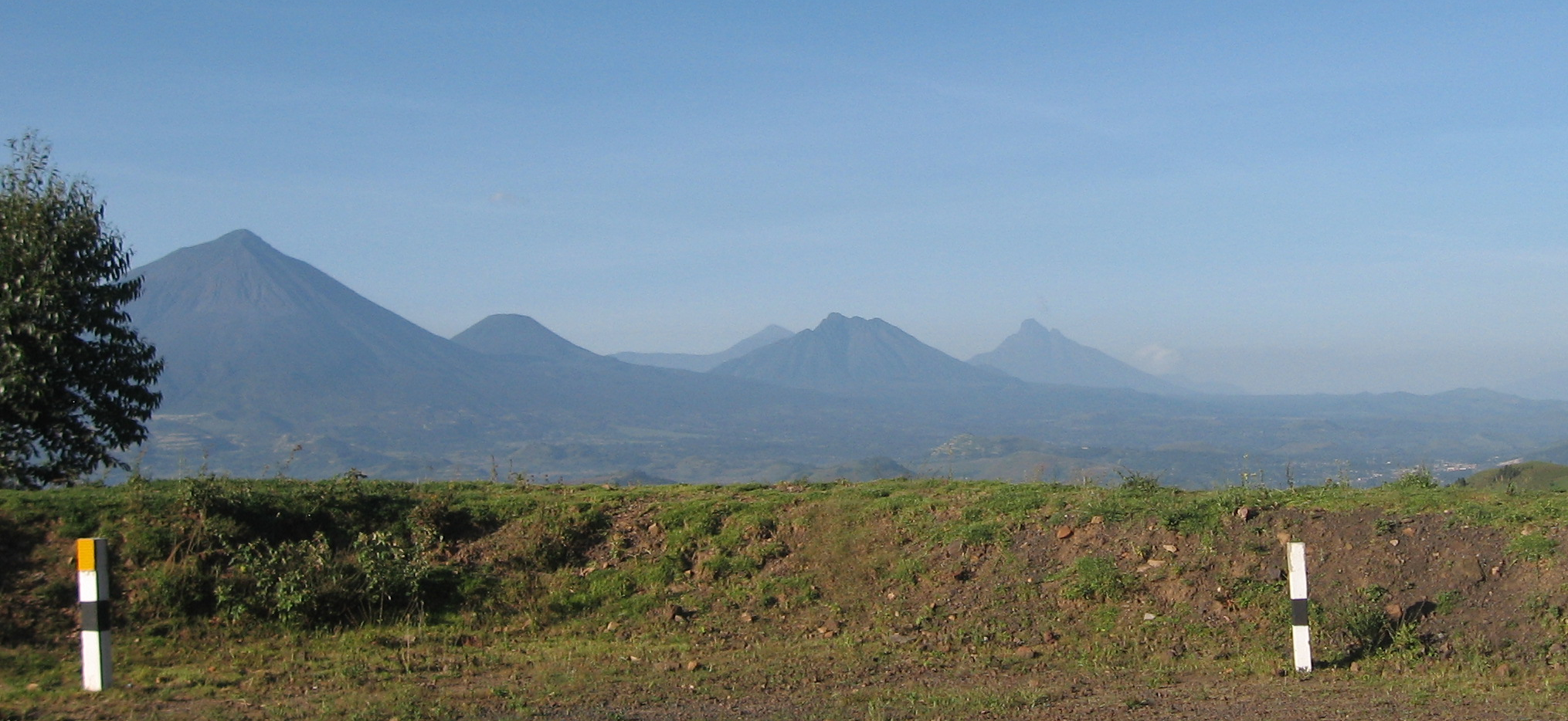
Muhabura, Gahinga, Karisimbi, Sabyinyo and Mikeno

The Virunga Mountains (also known as Mufumbiro) are a chain of volcanoes in East Africa, in the area where Rwanda, the Democratic Republic of the Congo (DRC), and Uganda meet. The mountain range is a branch of the Albertine Rift Mountains, which border the western branch of the East African Rift. They are located between Lake Edward and Lake Kivu. The name "Virunga" is an English version of the Kinyarwanda word ibirunga, which means "volcanoes".

The mountain range consists of eight major volcanoes. Most of them are dormant, except Mount Nyiragongo 3,462 metres (11,358 ft) and Mount Nyamuragira 3,063 metres (10,049 ft), both in the DRC. Recent eruptions occurred in 2006, 2010 and May 2021. Mount Karisimbi is the highest volcano at 4,507 metres (14,787 ft). The oldest mountain is Mount Sabyinyo, which rises 3,634 metres (11,923 ft) above sea level.

The Virunga Mountains are home of the endangered mountain gorilla, listed on the IUCN Red List of Endangered Species due to habitat loss, poaching, disease, and war (Butynski et al. 2003). However, there has been some recent improvement in the number of mountain gorillas owing to extreme conservation efforts. The Karisoke Research Center, founded by Dian Fossey to observe gorillas in their native habitat, is located between Mount Karisimbi and Mount Bisoke.

== List of mountain peaks in the Virunga Mountain Range ==
Name of mountain	Location	Elevation in metres	Elevation in feet
Mount Karisimbi	Rwanda / DRC	4,507	14,790
Mount Mikeno	DRC	4,437	14,560
Mount Muhabura	Rwanda / Uganda	4,127	13,540
Mount Bisoke	Rwanda / DRC	3,711	12,180
Mount Sabyinyo	Rwanda / Uganda / DRC	3,674	12,050
Mount Gahinga	Rwanda / Uganda	3,474	11,400
Mount Nyiragongo	DRC	3,470	11,400
Mount Nyamuragira	DRC	3,058	10,031

== National parks ==
- Virunga National Park, Democratic Republic of the Congo
- Volcanoes National Park, Rwanda
- Mgahinga Gorilla National Park, Uganda

== In culture ==
- Michael Crichton's novel Congo is set mostly in the Virunga region.
- Gorillas in the Mist, and the novel of the same name, document the work and death of primatologist Dian Fossey. The camp from which she operated, Karisoke Research Center, still exists in the Virunga Mountains.

== See also ==
- George Schaller
- Earl Denman

== Bibliography ==
- Chisholm, Hugh, ed. (1911). "Mfumbiro" . Encyclopædia Britannica (11th ed.). Cambridge University Press.
