= Tchegera Island =

Island in Goma, North Kivu

French: Île de Tchegera
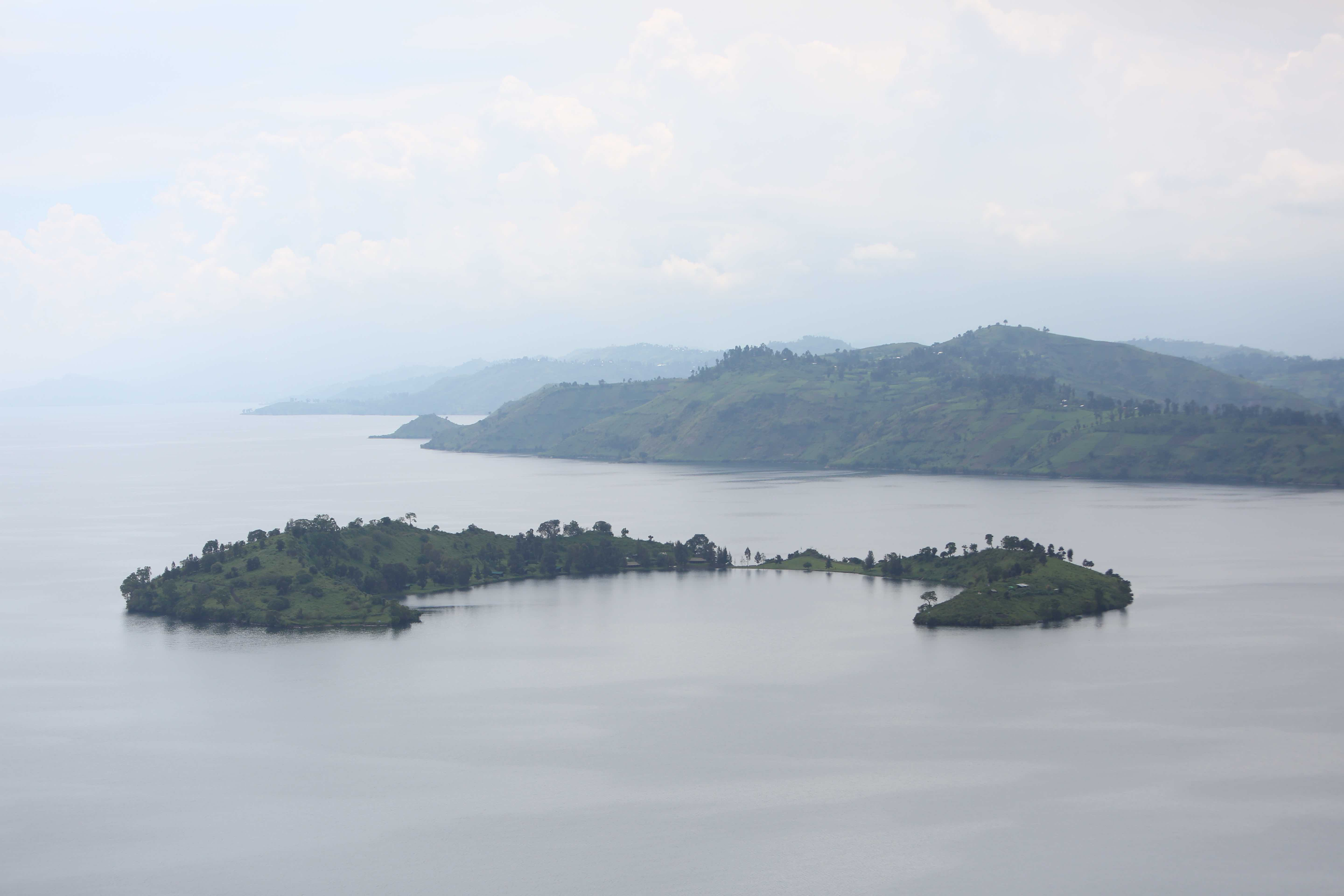
- View of Tshegera Island in 2015
- Interactive map of Tchegera Island

Geography
- Location: Virunga National Park

Administration
- Democratic Republic of the Congo
- Administered under the Institut Congolais pour la Conservation de la Nature

Tchegera Island (French: Île de Tchegera) is a U-shaped caved-in volcanic caldera island located northwest of Lake Kivu and southwest of Goma, within the Virunga National Park in the eastern region of the Democratic Republic of the Congo. The island forms the park's southwestern boundary and is the only portion of Virunga located in the South Kivu province, specifically in the Kalehe Territory. Administered by the Institut Congolais pour la Conservation de la Nature (ICCN), the island is a significant center for ecotourism, featuring tourist reception facilities such as safari-style tented camps that provide an ideal environment for relaxation and restoration.

== Geography ==
Tchegera Island is strategically located within the Virunga National Park. It exhibits a distinctive crescent shape resulting from the remnant of a long-extinct volcanic caldera partially submerged by the waters of Lake Kivu. Comprising primarily volcanic rock, its shores are predominantly covered in black sand. The island's topography is characterized by two principal arcs, each composed of double-sided hills conjoined by a median section of exposed volcanic substrate. Its highest peak rises 21 meters above the lake's surface, with the other peak standing at 12 meters. Tchegera Island encompasses an area of 92,632.45 square meters. Its contour lines, which descend at regular intervals of 1 meter, distinctly illustrate the island's gradual submersion into Lake Kivu.

Tchegera Island is rich in diverse flora, with a predominance of autochthonous arboreal species native to Virunga National Park. The island is also a thriving habitat for various avian species, making it a significant attraction for birdwatchers and ornithologists. It provides panoramic views of Virunga's two highest volcanoes, Mikeno and Karisimbi, along with the active Nyiragongo and Nyamulagira, whose luminous lava lakes create a nocturnal spectacle. Characterized by a humid and tropical climate, influenced by prevailing north–south winds, the island's central region is prone to submersion during the rainy season, with water levels rising to 50 centimeters.

== History ==
The island was officially opened to the public on 22 August 2015, in conjunction with unveiling four new activities within the Virunga National Park, presided over by the Minister of Tourism and Culture, Elvis Mutiri Wa Bashara. As reported by Radio Okapi, the Institut Congolais pour la Conservation de la Nature (ICCN) planned and executed the development of modern amenities on Tchegera Island, which included the construction of safari-style tented camps, a conference facility, and a restaurant catering to the island's visitors. Drawing inspiration from traditional Bantu architectural techniques, the island comprises approximately six opulent tented camps; each outfitted with en-suite bathrooms, hot running showers, and flush toilets. The tents were also equipped with power generators, charging ports, electric hair dryers, and high-quality torches. Additionally, there are bungalows and common areas. The island's energy and water systems are sustainably supported by solar panels, biogas installations, and reverse osmosis water filtration units.

Following its inauguration, Tchegera Island rapidly became one of Virunga National Park's top recreational destinations, attracting a large influx of tourists. In January 2016, the New York Times placed Virunga Park 19th on its list of the "52 Places to Go in 2016", citing Tchegera Island as a key spot for observing "eagles and herons".

== Tourism ==
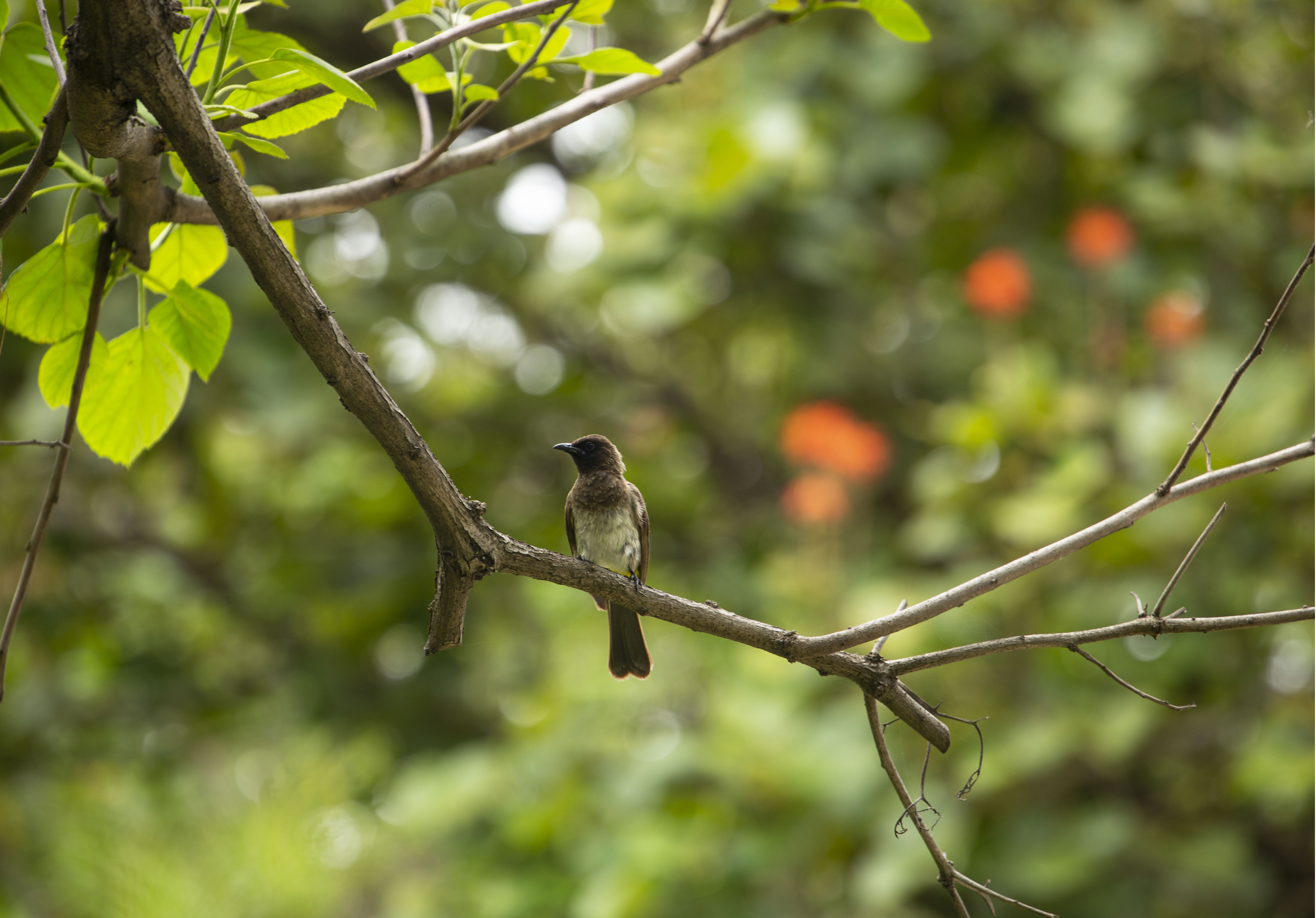
Birds spotted on Tchegera Island

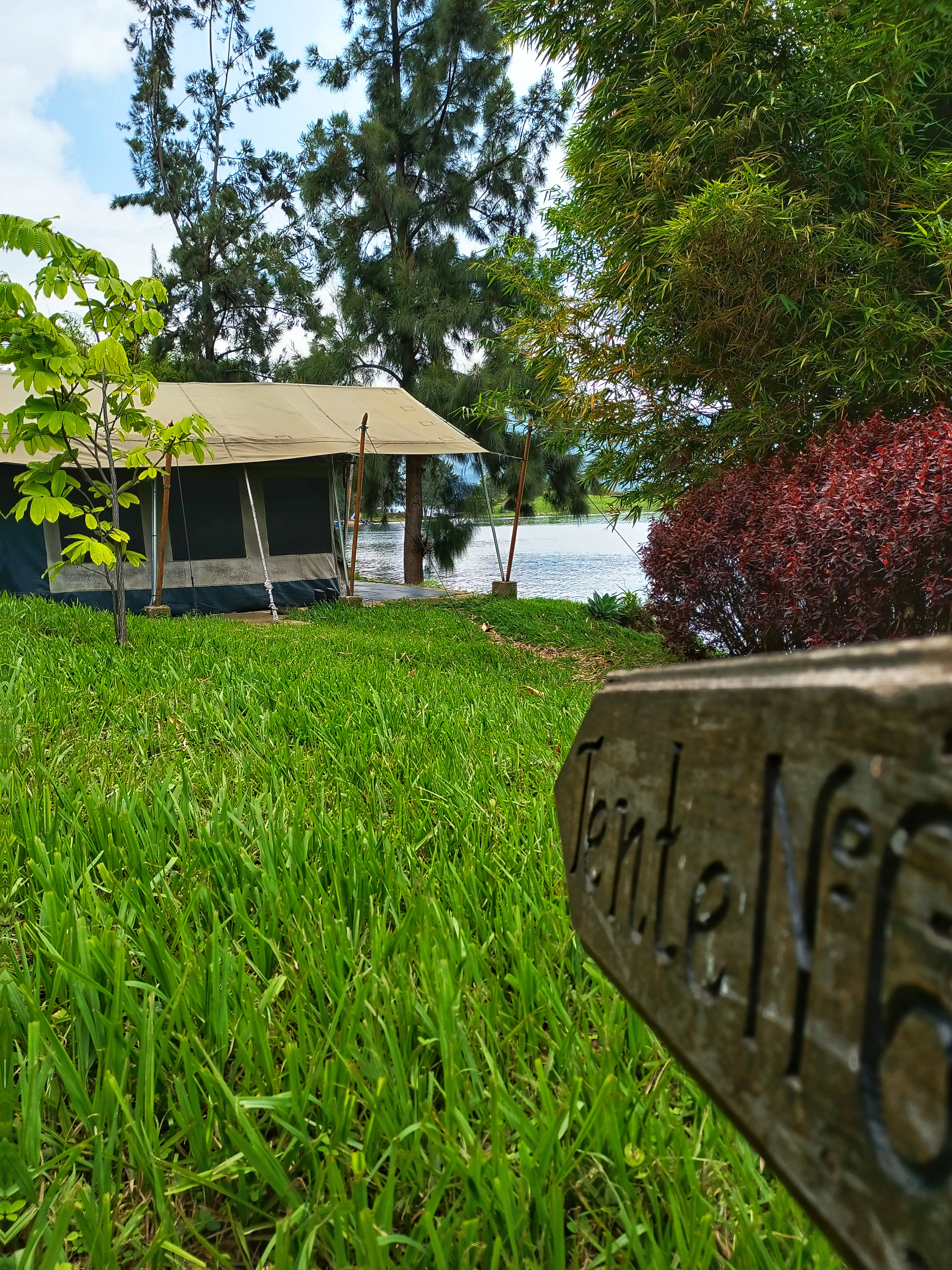
A safari-style tented camp on the island

The Tchegera Island serves as Virunga National Park's idyllic sanctuary for tourists after a gorilla trek and a hike up Mount Nyiragongo. Accessible through a 7.5–10 mile (15 or 20 minutes) boat ride from Goma harbor, the island boasts diverse flora and fauna, including a variety of animal species, plant life, birds, monkeys, and butterflies. It also offers views of Mount Nyiragongo and Mount Nyamulagira. Mount Mikeno and Karisimbi's silhouettes are also visible from the island.

Accommodations on Tchegera Island consist of six luxuriously appointed tents, each featuring en-suite bathrooms, running hot water showers, flush toilets, and electrical amenities powered by a generator. The most prominent activities include paddleboarding, kayaking, bird watching, and nature walks. Nature walks offer sightings of diverse wildlife, such as the blue monkeys, and provide opportunities for bird watching, with species like the African fish eagle and gulls gracing the island. Other activities include swimming, fishing on Lake Kivu, snorkeling, and scenic and sunset viewing.
