= Yellow-crested helmetshrike =

- Rwandan stamp featuring the yellow-crested helmetshrike

Conservation status
- Vulnerable (IUCN 3.1)

Scientific classification
- Kingdom: Animalia
- Phylum: Chordata
- Class: Aves
- Order: Passeriformes
- Family: Vangidae
- Genus: Prionops
- Species: P. alberti

Binomial name
- Prionops alberti Schouteden, 1933

Species of bird

The yellow-crested helmetshrike (Prionops alberti) or King Albert's helmetshrike is a species of bird in the Vanga family Vangidae. This large, striking helmetshrike is unique in its black plumage and bright yellow crest. Though this species has been encountered broadly across the mountains of the eastern Democratic Republic of the Congo, there is still much to learn about this species. It is rarely reported due to the majority of its distribution occurring in relatively remote regions within the Albertine Rift, an area with ongoing armed conflict.

== Description ==
=== Appearance ===
Adults are generally all black with a bright yellow or gold crest (sometimes described as a "helmet"), with the yellow extending across the entire top half of the head above the eyeline and extending backwards behind the eye. The greenish-yellow irides are surrounded by an orange eye-wattle; the bill, like the plumage, is black, though the legs and feet are reported to be light red. Individuals can be quite variable in terms of crest color, ranging from grayish-white to pale yellowish to bright gold, with variation possibly attributable either to individual variation or to wear. "Berlioz" (likely Jacques Berlioz) communicated that the yellow pigments in the crest feathers are "soluble in benzine, alcohol, and to some extent even in water". Some birds also have varying amount of gray or white in the webbing of the primaries, but some birds are wholly black.

Young birds have whitish crowns that appear dirty or faintly yellow. The bills of juveniles are likely light red, not black.

Sexually monomorphic.

=== Vocalizations ===
The call has been described as a two-parted "tlu-uk" or "clu-uk" in the field, repeated as many as six times. Responds strongly to alarm calls from other individuals.

== Taxonomy ==
The yellow-crested helmetshrike is a member of the family Vangidae. This species, along with other members of the genus Prionops, was formerly considered a member of the family Malaconotidae. Little is known about this species, and its taxonomic placement within the genus Prionops is uncertain. It is a monotypic species. Its specific epithet comes from King Albert I of Belgium, as the species' type locality was located what was then the Belgian Congo.

== Distribution and habitat ==
=== Distribution ===
It is endemic to the Democratic Republic of the Congo, with all confirmed records found from the Lendu Plateau west of Lake Mwitanzige (also known as Lake Albert) in the north to Mount Kabobo in the south. It has been suspected to occur outside of the Democratic Republic of the Congo, as the type specimen is from Mount Mikeno near the border between the Democratic Republic of the Congo and Uganda, and a sight record of a flock exists from nearby Mount Nyiragongo. Furthermore, a hypothetical sight record exists for Bwindi Impenetrable Forest in Uganda.

=== Habitat ===
Its natural habitat is subtropical or tropical moist montane forest in the Albertine Rift, largely between the elevations of 1120–2500 m in elevation. Birds have been reported foraging in Hagenia trees on Mount Kahuzi. However, the type specimen was found dead ("mummified") on the summit of Mount Mikeno at 4,400 m in elevation; this record is both above the montane forest zone usually inhabited by this species and it is one of the most remote records of the species, leading to speculation that this is an extralimital individual. It has been suspected that this species may undertake seasonal altitudinal migration.

== Behavior ==
=== Foraging and general behaviour ===
The species is insectivorous, actively searching and hunting for arthropods in fast-moving groups of up to 14-20 individuals in the forest canopy, similar to other Prionops. So far as is known, this species is non-migratory, but elevational movements may occur seasonally.

=== Reproduction ===
The nest is undescribed.

Chapin suspected that the species does not have a small, discrete breeding season in the northern part of its distribution. Juvenile birds have been reported from Lutunguru, North Kivu between mid-August and October, leading Alexandre Prigogine to suspect that eggs are laid sometime in June or July.

== Conservation ==
It is threatened by habitat loss.

As of 2024, the species is considered vulnerable by the International Union for Conservation of Nature.

The yellow-crested helmetshrike, previously categorized as a lost species, was rediscovered by biologist Michael Harvey's team during a six-week expedition to the Itombwe Mountains in December 2023. They encountered 18 of the elusive birds in three locations, suggesting a potentially healthy population.
