= List of volcanoes in the Democratic Republic of the Congo =

This is a list of active and extinct volcanoes in the Democratic Republic of the Congo.

== Volcanoes ==
Name	Elevation		Location	Last eruption
Name	meters	feet	Coordinates	Last eruption
May-Ya-Moto	2000	-	0.93°S 29.33°E	-
Nyamuragira	3058	10,033	1.408°S 29.20°E	2023 (continuing)
Mount Nyiragongo	3470	11,384	1.52°S 29.25°E	2023 (continuing)
Tshibinda	1460	4790	2.32°S 28.75°E	Holocene
Bisoke	3711	12,175	1.47°S 29.492°E	1957
Karisimbi	4507	14,787	1.50563°S 29.45072°E	8050 BCE
Mikeno	4437	14,557	1.46471°S 29.45°E	Pleistocene
Visoke	3711	12,175	1.460833°S 29.481667°E	1957
Sabinyo	3669	12,037	1.24°S 29.36°E	Pleistocene
