= Chibinda =

Chibinda or Tchibinda can refer to:

- Tchibinda, a lake in Conkouati-Douli National Park in the Republic of the Congo
- Chibinda or Tchibinda, a common surname in western Central Africa
- Chibinda or Tchibinda, an alternate name for the Ibinda language of Cabinda, Angola

== See also ==
- Tshibinda
- Tshibinda Ilunga
