= Kambale =

Kambale is a surname. Notable people with this surname include:

- Kambale Ferigo, Ugandan politician and legislator
- Augustin Kambale, Congolese ranger
- Matthews Kambale, Malawian former long-distance runner
