= Murara =

Secondary crater of volcano Nyamuragira

Highest point
- Elevation: less than 3,058 metres (10,033 feet)
- Coordinates: 1°24′30″S 29°12′0″E

Geography
- Location: Democratic Republic of the Congo
- Parent range: Virunga Mountains

Geology
- Mountain type: Cinder cone
- Last eruption: 1977

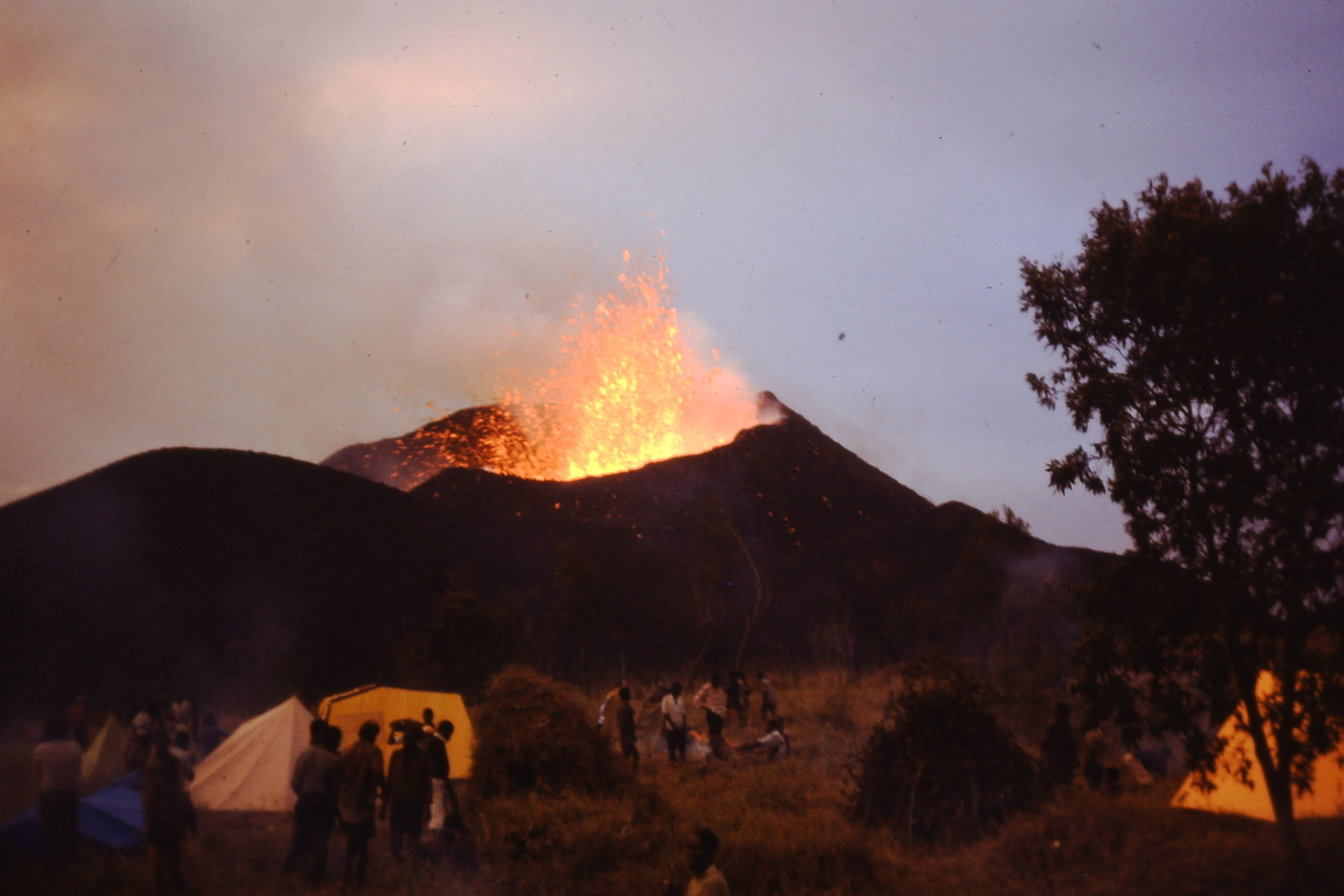
Erupting cinder cone volcano in background, with temporary tourist camp in foreground.

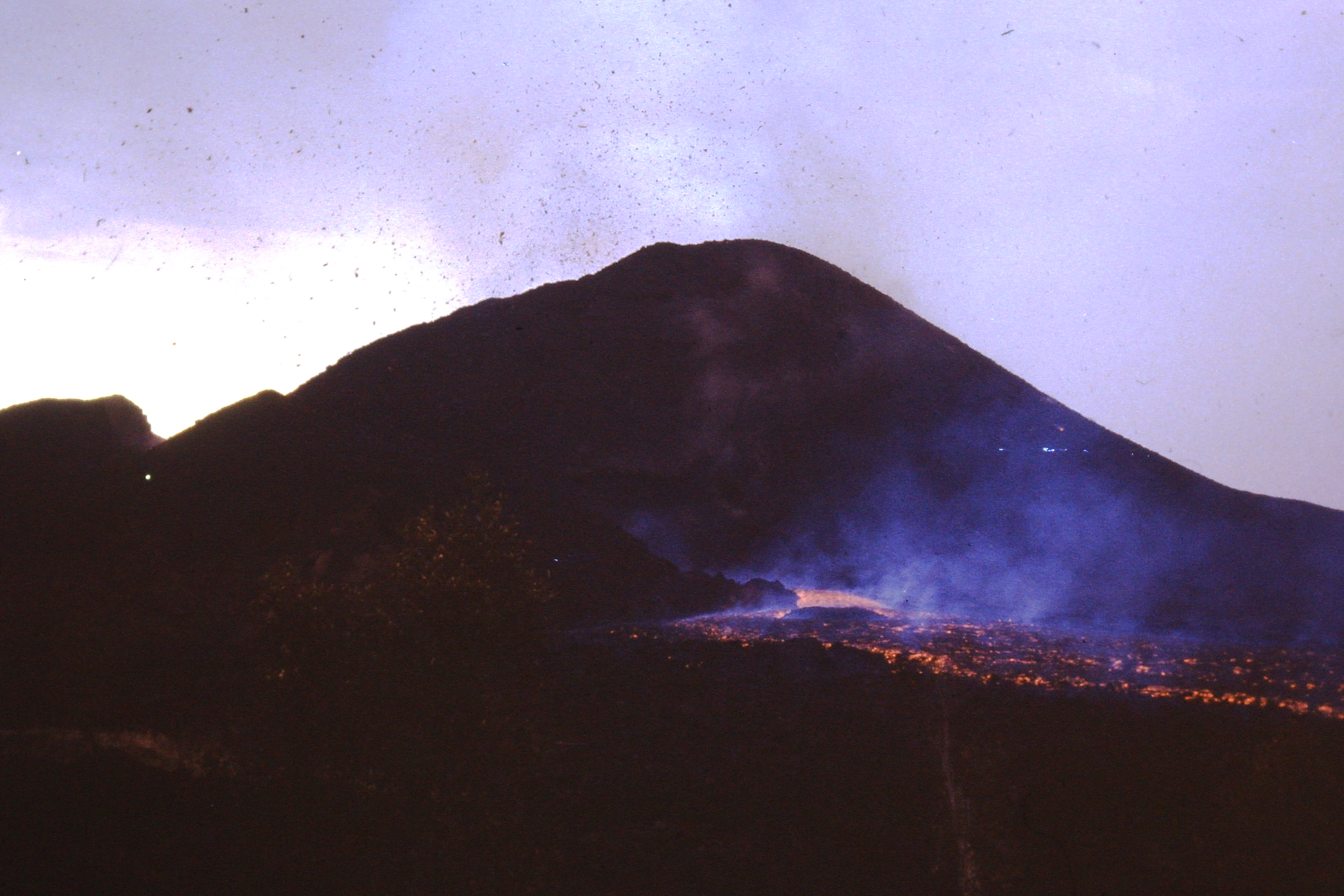
Lava flow in the foreground with the outline of the Murara cinder cone in the background

Murara was a small, short-lived, cinder cone on the flank of Mount Nyamuragira, that began erupting on December 23, 1976. It is located about twelve kilometers south-southwest of the main crater of Nyamuragira, in the Democratic Republic of the Congo. On 18 January 1977, the height of the cone was measured as 150 metres.

Eruptions from Murara reduced considerably after the eruption of Mount Nyiragongo on January 10, 1977 and ended completely in April 1977.

During the Christmas and New Year holiday period, the Virunga National Park authorities organised a temporary camp, within a few hundred metres of Murara, so that visitors could observe the eruption and lava flow.
