= Ndakasi =

Female mountain gorilla

- Species: Mountain gorilla
- Sex: Female
- Born: 16 April 2007; Virunga National Park, Democratic Republic of the Congo
- Died: 26 September 2021 (aged 14); Virunga National Park, Democratic Republic of the Congo
- Known for: photobombing

Ndakasi (17 April 2007 – 26 September 2021) was an orphaned mountain gorilla who received international attention in 2019 after "photobombing" a selfie.

== Biography ==
Ndakasi was born on 17 April 2007 in the Virunga National Park in the Democratic Republic of the Congo, the daughter of silverback Senkwekwe and Nyiransekuye. Alongside her parents, three additional females and three other babies, Ndakasi made up the Kabirizi family. In June 2007, when Ndakasi was two months old, her entire family was shot dead by a militia operating in the east of the DRC; Ndakasi was the sole survivor, and was found by park rangers while she was still attempting to suckle from her mother the following day.

After initially being cared for by rangers in Goma, during which time she almost died of pneumonia, the decision was made that Ndakasi was too vulnerable to be released back into the wild, and she was instead raised permanently by rangers within Virunga National Park. In 2009, the Senkwekwe Center was opened, specifically to care for orphaned mountain gorillas, near Rumangabo; Ndakasi would spend the rest of her life there. The centre was named after her father, who it was believed had died attempting to protect his family from militias.

In 2019, Ndakasi and a fellow orphaned mountain gorilla, Ndeze, received international attention after photobombing a selfie taken by ranger Mathieu Shamavu. It was speculated that Ndakazi and Ndeze were imitating human behaviour by standing upright and mimicking the rangers who raised them.

In 2021, Ndakasi started losing weight and hair and lost her appetite. On 26 September 2021, she died at the Senkwekwe Mountain Gorilla Center, in the arms of ranger Andre Bauma, who had been among her rescuers in 2007. At the time of her death, Ndakasi was one of only four non-wild mountain gorillas in the wild. Her death was announced by Virunga National Park on 7 October 2021, with a photo of her in Bauma's arms also going viral.

== Recognition ==
Following her death, Bauma released a statement saying "it was a privilege to support and care for such a loving creature, especially knowing the trauma Ndakasi suffered at a very young age. It was Ndakasi's sweet nature and intelligence that helped me to understand the connection between humans and great apes and why we should do everything in our power to protect them. I am proud to have called Ndakasi my friend. I loved her like a child and her cheerful personality brought a smile to my face every time I interacted with her. She will be missed by all of us at Virunga but we are forever grateful for the richness Ndakasi brought to our lives during her time at Senkwekwe."

Ndakasi was featured in the 2014 documentary film Virunga, detailing the work of rangers to protect mountain gorillas within the Virunga National Park. The film was nominated for the Academy Award for Best Documentary Feature.

Following her death in 2021, obituaries for Ndakasi were published by BBC News, The New York Times, National Geographic, CNN and The Washington Post, among others. "Ndakasis passing" by Brent Stirton won the Photojurnalism category in 2022.
