= May-Ya-Moto =

Volcano in the east of the Democratic Republic of the Congo

Mayi-Ya-Moto
- Location within Democratic Republic of the Congo

Highest point
- Elevation: 950 m (3,120 ft)
- Coordinates: 0°55′48″S 29°19′48″E

Geography
- Location: Democratic Republic of the Congo

Geology
- Formed by: Volcanism along the Albertine Rift
- Mountain type: Volcano
- Last eruption: unknown

May-Ya-Moto is a potentially active volcano in the east of the Democratic Republic of the Congo. It has a prominence of 950 metres (3,117 ft). Although no eruptions have been dated, the volcano still shows signs of unrest. At the crater, fumaroles and hot springs are active. Water temperatures are less than (100 °C (212 °F). There have been few studies on this volcano.

== See also ==
- List of volcanoes in the Democratic Republic of the Congo
