= Lwiro shrew =

Conservation status
- Data Deficient (IUCN 3.1)

Scientific classification
- Kingdom: Animalia
- Phylum: Chordata
- Class: Mammalia
- Order: Eulipotyphla
- Family: Soricidae
- Genus: Crocidura
- Species: C. lwiroensis

Binomial name
- Crocidura lwiroensis Kerbis Peterhans & Hutterer, 2013

Species of mammal

The Lwiro shrew or Misotshi-Kabogo shrew (Crocidura lwiroensis) is a species of mammal in the family Soricidae. It is endemic to the Misotshi-Kabogo Massif, Democratic Republic of the Congo.

== Etymology ==
It is named in honor of the research team based at the Lwiro (Centre de Recherche en Hydrobiologie) biological research station north of Bukavu.

== Distribution and habitat ==
It is found in the Democratic Republic of the Congo, where it is restricted to a small portion of the Albertine Rift on the western shore of Lake Tanganyika. It is restricted to the Misotshi-Kabogo highlands, an isolated region of montane forest south of the Itombwe Mountains. The only known specimen was found along a creek in a primary forest.

== Description ==
It is very small in body size with a nearly naked tail. It has dark gray fur above and lighter gray fur below. It has a total length of 110 mm, a tail of 45 mm, and a weight of 5.6 g.

== Status ==
Although classified as Data Deficient due to lack of studies, it is likely threatened by deforestation for agricultural expansion, mining concessions, as well as an increase in local population from migration by refugees from the Kivu conflict, which may impact the ecosystem.
