= Virunga Foundation =

- Founded: 20 October 2005
- Purpose: Nature conservation, biodiversity
- Location: Democratic Republic of the Congo

The Virunga Foundation is a non-governmental organisation working in the field of nature conservation. Registered in London and funded by the European Union, it is focused on protecting the wildlife in Virunga National Park in partnership with the Democratic Republic of Congo's ICCN. Its name between 2005 and 2014 was African Conservation Fund.

== International Gorilla Conservation Programme ==
In 2017, the Virunga Foundation started a conservation project that targets the mountain gorilla (Gorilla beringei beringei), in which the Volcanoes National Park also participated.

== Controversy ==
The Virunga Foundation and Virunga National Park have faced criticism that their conservation efforts in the region have led to the "militarization of conservation" and further violence and dispossession faced by local Indigenous peoples. Communities, such as the Mbuti, which previously relied on the lands included in the park for food and shelter have been forced out, or risk being arrested or killed by armed park rangers.

== See also ==
- Wildlife of the Democratic Republic of the Congo
