= IGorilla =

Software for Smartphones by Apple

iGorilla is a software application (app) that is designed for use with the internet and multimedia enabled smartphones iPhone or iPod Touch, which were created by Apple Inc. iGorilla is the first app to be dedicated to the protection of mountain gorillas and is evidence that organizations involved in wildlife conservation are using digital media technology to raise funds and awareness by communicating directly with people who are concerned about the planet’s biological heritage.

== Design ==
The app was developed by I-SITE, a US-registered company that has been designing websites and interactive media since 1996. The company, based at an old toy store in Philadelphia, has created websites and applications for scooters, magazines, kids, beverages, analgesics and plants.

== Operating requirements ==
iGorilla works with all iPhones and iPod Touches running 2.0 software or later. Users require Wi-Fi, EDGE, or 3G network.

== Cost and use of funds ==
When it was launched, in May 2010, the app cost $3.99 to download from the iTunes App Store. They pledge that 70 percent of that money goes directly to pay field staff involved in the protection of gorillas.

== Concept ==
The purpose of the app is to enable iPhone and iPod Touch owners worldwide to follow the daily lives of the mountain gorillas that live in Virunga National Park (ViNP), in the Democratic Republic of Congo(DRC). The app allows users to access information, in the form of blogs and videos sent directly from ViNP, pertaining to the gorillas and their families, and the park rangers, vets and staff who look after them.

== The mountain gorilla ==
Gorillas are the largest of the living primates. The mountain gorilla (Gorilla beringei beringei), one of the two subspecies of eastern gorilla, is found in the Virunga Mountains in Central Africa and in the Bwindi Impenetrable Forest in Uganda. The lowland eastern gorilla (Gorilla beringei graueri), also known as the Grauer's gorilla, is a subspecies of eastern gorilla and is only found in the forests of eastern DRC. ViNP is home to around two-hundred of the seven-hundred and fifty mountain gorillas left alive. The mountain gorilla is a critically endangered species. ViNP's gorilla population is particularly vulnerable because the DRC is so politically unstable.

== Virunga National Park and the Congolese Wildlife Authority ==
ViNP, Africa’s oldest national park and a UNESCO World Heritage Site since 1979, lies in eastern DRC and covers 7,800 square kilometers. The park is managed by the Congolese Wildlife Authority which, in French, is known as the Institut Congolais pour la Conservation de la Nature (ICCN). ICCN rangers protect Congo’s national parks and wildlife from poachers, rebel groups, illegal mining, farming, and settlement, and charcoal production. That job became increasingly difficult during the First and Second Congo Wars, and the subsequent Kivu Conflict, as fighting caused widespread damage to the region’s infrastructure and society. More than 150 ICCN rangers were killed in action between 1996 and 2010.

== IGorilla as an example of a digital media tool for direct fundraising ==
The iGorilla app is one of the numerous measures taken by ViNP to promote awareness about the plight of Congo’s biological heritage and raise funds to help protect it. ViNP's use of the app is evidence that organizations dedicated to wildlife conservation are using digital media technology to establish direct relationships - as opposed to those brokered by international organizations, non-governmental organizations or charities - with people who are concerned about the protection of wildlife.

This kind of direct fundraising is increasingly important to organizations involved in wildlife conservation, especially to those operating in sub-Saharan Africa. Even in times of peace the management of a protected area in this region can be difficult. The institutions charged with the task are fragile; often they are under-funded, and lack the necessary support from central government successfully to withstand the pressure exerted on them by increasing numbers of increasingly desperate people. What little long-term, guaranteed funding that is available to them can be withdrawn at short notice if the extremely volatile political situation changes. So having the tools to establish and maintain direct relationships with large numbers of non-institutional donors is important. ViNP’s Director, for example, was sure of the importance of these direct relationships and the tools, like iGorilla, that facilitate them: ‘The survival of Congo's mountain gorillas relies on our ability to reach out to individuals around the world who care, and to keep them informed on a daily, even hourly basis, of the rangers' efforts to protect the wildlife in Virunga National Park. iGorilla provides us with exactly that opportunity.’
