= Mount Mikeno =

Extinct volcano in the Democratic Republic of Congo

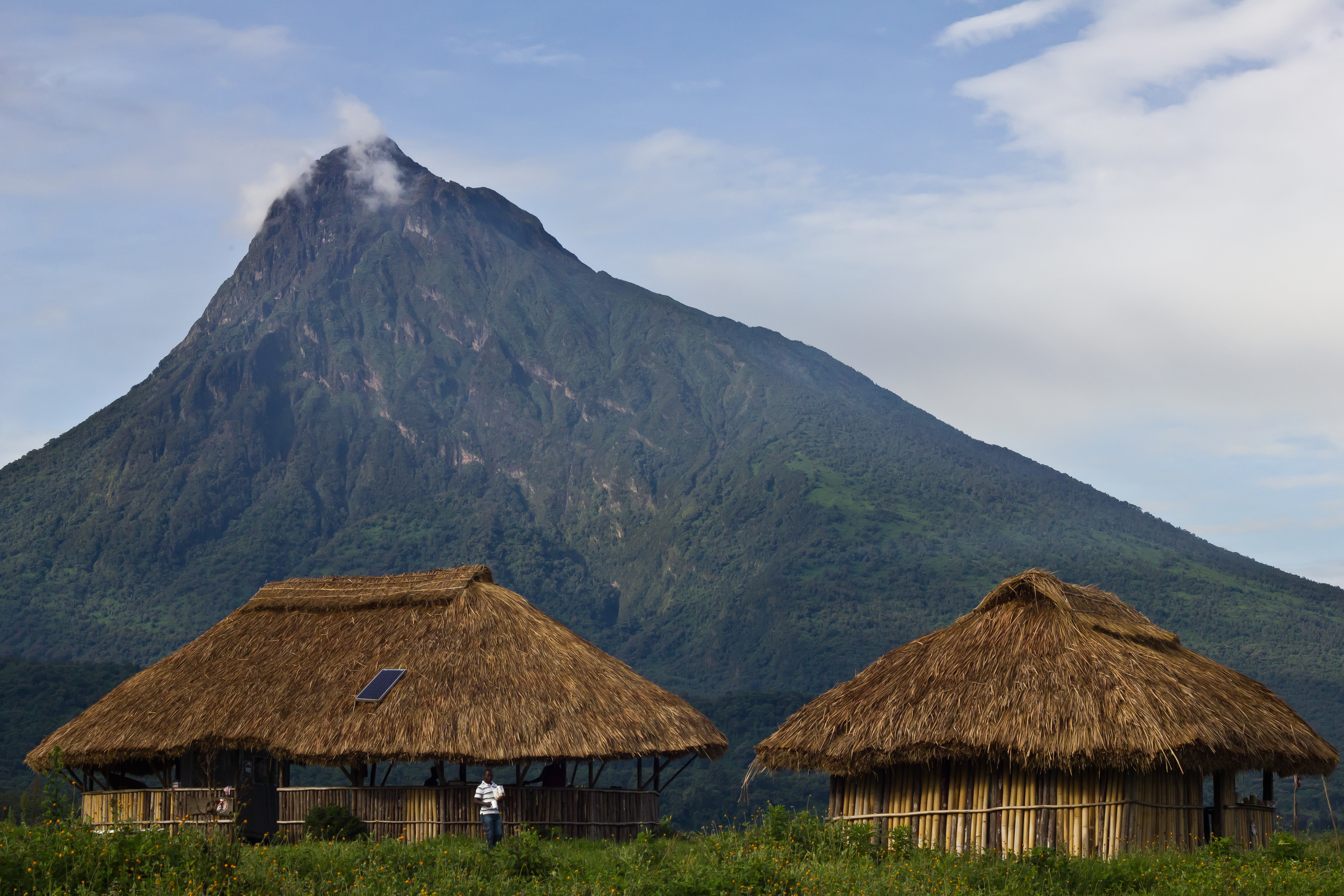

Highest point
- Elevation: 4,437 m (14,557 ft)
- Prominence: 1,193 m (3,914 ft)
- Parent peak: Mount Karisimbi
- Listing: Highest mountain peaks of Africa
- Coordinates: 1°27′53″S 29°25′10″E

Geography
- Location within Democratic Republic of the Congo
- Location: Democratic Republic of the Congo
- Parent range: Virunga Mountains

Geology
- Mountain type: Stratovolcano
- Last eruption: Pleistocene

Mount Mikeno is an extinct volcanic mountain located in the Democratic Republic of the Congo section of the Virunga Mountains along with Mount Nyiragongo, Mount Nyamuragira, Mount Karisimbi, Mount Bisoke and Mount Sabyinyo. At 4,437 metres (14,557 ft) Mount Mikeno is the second highest peak in the Virunga Mountains after Karisimbi, and the 13th highest in Africa. Mikeno means "poor" and is so named for its harsh slopes which preclude human habitation.

Mount Mikeno lies completely within Virunga National Park and is known for the critically endangered mountain gorillas that live on its slopes. Expeditions to observe Mikeno's gorillas typically leave from the nearby Bukima Patrol Post.

Mount Mikeno is the type locality of the yellow-crested helmetshrike Prionops alberti.

It was featured in the movie Congo where the city of Solomon diamond mine is located.
