= Augustin Kambale =

Congolese patrol ranger and conservationist

Augustin Kambale is the head of the Bukima ranger patrol post, in the Mikeno sector of Virunga National Park in the Democratic Republic of the Congo. His patrol group has gained notoriety in recent years due to the importance of Virunga to conservationists, as it serves as the refuge for 100 of the world's 700 remaining silverback gorillas. It has also been subjected to numerous bloody attacks from rebels camped or residing outside of the park boundaries; since 1996, over 120 Virunga rangers have been murdered by rebels such as the Mai Mai and the forces of General Laurent Nkunda. However, Nkunda signed a ceasefire in February 2007 with the government in Kinshasa, thus allowing for the rangers at Virunga to focus more on their jobs as conservationists.

He also works with the efforts of WildlifeDirect and British conservationist Rob Muir.

== Personal life ==
He was married in a religious ceremony to his wife, Josephine, in 1990, but didn't marry her in a civil ceremony until March 31, 2007, in Kiwanja, near Rutshuru.
