= Kabobo Massif =

Region in the Democratic Republic of the Congo

- Location within Democratic Republic of the Congo

Highest point
- Elevation: 2,725 m (8,940 ft)
- Prominence: 1,601 m (5,253 ft)
- Listing: Ultra; Ribu
- Coordinates: 05°08′12″S 29°03′13″E

Geography
- Location: Tanganyika and South Kivu, Democratic Republic of the Congo

The Kabobo Massif (Mitsoshi-Kabogo or Kabogo Massif) is a mountain region in Tanganyika and South Kivu Provinces, Democratic Republic of the Congo known for its unique flora and fauna. One of its most prominent peaks is Mount Kabobo (also known as Mount Kabogo), while another is known as Misotshi. While Misotshi-Kabogo appears to be a more appropriate name for the massif, it is most commonly referred to in the literature by the misinterpreted name Kabobo.

== Geography ==
Kabobo Massif has four peaks, Kabili, Kabobo (Kabogo or Ngamikka), Ngandja, and Misotshi.

== Etymology ==
There is apparently no widely accepted local name for the mountain range, with most reports referring to the region by the Belgian misnomer Kabobo, the more appropriate Babembe Kabogo, or as Misotshi-Kabogo. The name Misotshi-Kabogo comes from the most important sacred peak for the Babembe people (Misotshi) and after a peak near the headwaters of the Kabogo river. It is reported that the name Kabobo was a misinterpretation of the name Kabogo by the Belgians, with Kabogo being the Babembe word for "power" and a reference to a spirit that resides in the Kabogo river.

== Flora and fauna ==
The massif is dominated by montane forest and is among Africa's most biodiverse sites. The massif is recognized as the Mount Kabobo Important Bird Area (CD015). As of 2017, some 1,410 species of plants and 558 species of terrestrial vertebrates had been documented in Kabobo Massif. The region is considered unique in the present day for its large extent of intact montane forest, and for the fact that intact forest exists from at or near lake level to the highest elevations.

=== Endemic taxa ===
Several taxa are endemic to the massif, and the area is considered a biodiversity hotspot by conservation authorities. More research is needed to clarify how many unique populations and subspecies occur within the region.

==== Birds ====
Genetic analyses on the birds of the massif indicate that there is unrecognized diversity in the region, and that several presently recognized subspecies may be worthy of species recognition. The following species are endemic to the massif:

- Kabobo apalis (Apalis kaboboensis)

Additionally, the following subspecies are also wholly endemic to the massif:

- Rwenzori turaco Ruwenzorornis johnstoni bredoi
- Stripe-breasted tit Melaniparus fasciiventer kaboboensis
- Red-faced woodland-warbler Phylloscopus laetus schoutedeni
- Archer's robin-chat Dessonornis archeri kimbutui
- Red-throated alethe Chamaetylas poliophrys kaboboensis
- Short-tailed akalat Sheppardia poensis kaboboensis
- Blue-headed sunbird Cyanomitra alinae kaboboensis

==== Mammals ====
The following subspecies are endemic to the massif (note that this list is incomplete as of February 2023):

- Angolan colobus Colobus angolensis prigoginei
- Lwiro shrew Crocidura lwiroensis (also known as "Misotshi-Kabogo shrew")

==== Plants ====
The following species are endemic to the massif (note that this list is incomplete as of February 2023):

- Aframomum ngamikkense, a species of wild ginger described in 2017.

== Conservation ==
The region is relatively intact, but artisanal gold mining in the region has been considered a threat to local biodiversity. Local taboos associated with the sacred peak Misotshi discourage the hunting of chimpanzees and discourage local deforestation.
