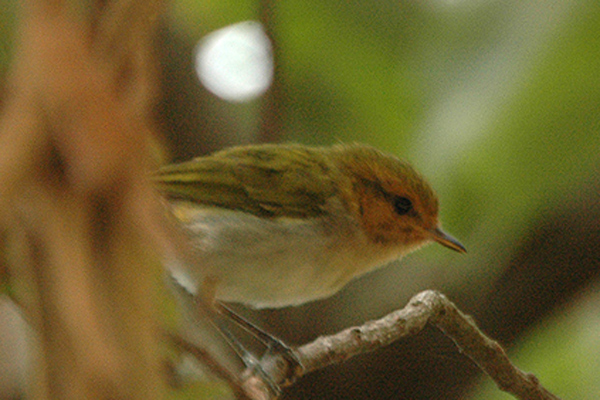

Conservation status
- Least Concern (IUCN 3.1)

Scientific classification
- Kingdom: Animalia
- Phylum: Chordata
- Class: Aves
- Order: Passeriformes
- Family: Phylloscopidae
- Genus: Phylloscopus
- Species: P. laetus

Binomial name
- Phylloscopus laetus (Sharpe, 1902)

= Red-faced woodland warbler =

Species of bird

The red-faced woodland warbler (Phylloscopus laetus) is a species of leaf warbler in the family Phylloscopidae. It forms a superspecies with the closely related yellow-throated woodland warbler and the Laura's woodland warbler.

It is endemic to the Albertine Rift montane forests.

Two subspecies are recognised, the nominate P. l. laetus ranges from Western Uganda and eastern Democratic Republic of the Congo (the Ruwenzori Mountains), south through SW Uganda, western Rwanda and western Burundi. The second subspecies, P. l. schoutedeni, has a more restricted range, being confined to Mt. Kabobo in eastern DRC. It is one of several species known as Albertine Rift Valley endemics. Overall the species has a total range of 77,000 square kilometres (29000 sq mi). Its natural habitat is highland forest between 1200–3100 m, especially in bamboo; it also occurs in areas of secondary forest.

The red-faced woodland warbler is a medium-sized (11 cm) warbler with a distinctive reddish face, which is richer on P. l. schoutedeni. Overall the rest of the plumage is greenish above with a paler off-white belly and rump.

Little is known about the breeding biology of this species. Two or three eggs are laid in a ball nest suspended in a tangle of vines in shrubs and trees (up to 10 m above the ground). Both parents care for the young. Red-faced woodland warblers feed on insects and other invertebrates, particularly bugs, beetles and spiders. They hunt in pairs and will sometimes join small feeding flocks.

The red-faced woodland warbler is not considered threatened by human activities. It has a small worldwide range but is relatively common where it occurs. It is classified as least concern by the IUCN.
