= Photobombing =

Act of making an unsolicited appearance in a photograph

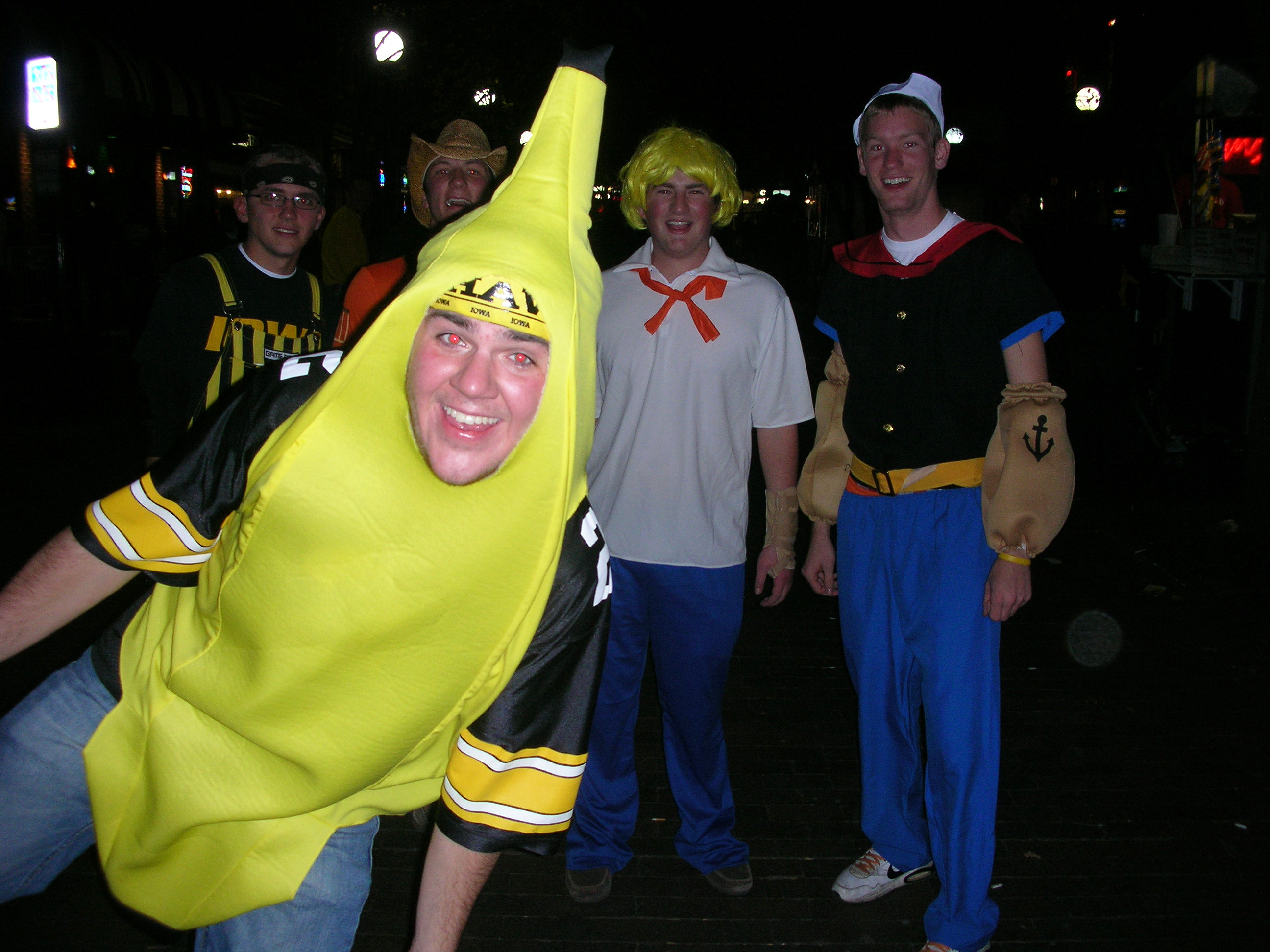
Photobomb in Iowa City, 2010

Photobombing is the act of purposely putting oneself into the view of a photograph, often in order to play a practical joke on the photographer or the subjects. Photobombing has received significant coverage since 2009. In discussing a "stingray photobomb" picture that became popular, Andrea DenHoed suggests that the photobomb label "implies a narrative of surreptitious sabotage," although in the sense of unintended or initially unnoticed people in the background of spoiled photographs, photobombs have existed for much of the history of photography.

In 2014, "photobomb" was named Word of the Year by the Collins English Dictionary after several photos of celebrities photobombing at awards ceremonies had gone viral.

== Examples in the media ==
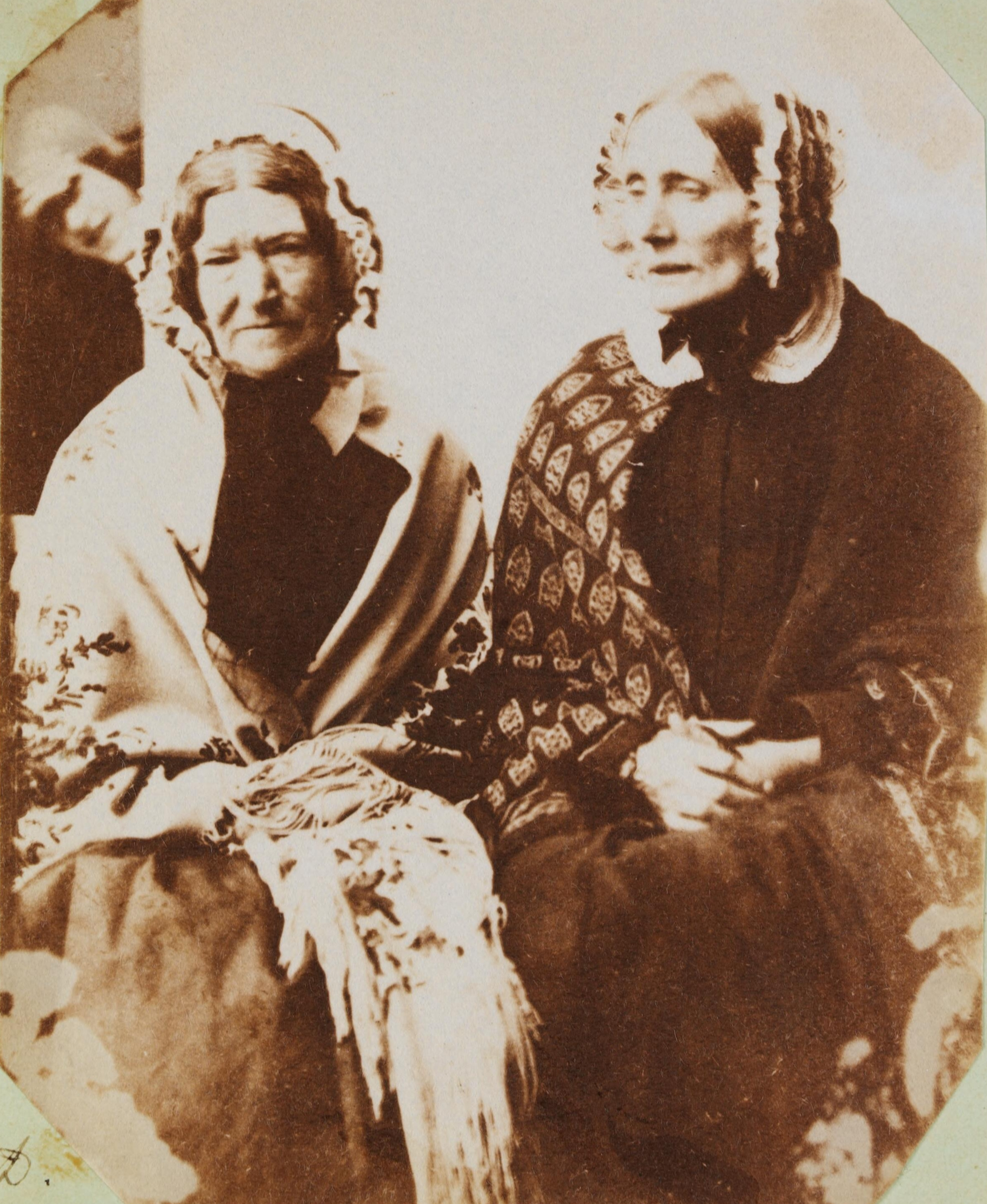
This image taken in Wales in c. 1853 is possibly the earliest example of a photobomb.

- Bill Clinton photobombed Kelly Clarkson during her performance of "My Country 'Tis of Thee" at the second inauguration of Barack Obama in 2013. A few weeks later, Clarkson herself photobombed Ellen DeGeneres and Portia de Rossi at the 2013 Grammy Awards.
- Queen Elizabeth II photobombed two Australian athletes at the 2014 Commonwealth Games in Glasgow, Scotland. The resulting image was displayed for a question in that year's edition of The Big Fat Quiz of the Year.
- A putative "first photobomb", taken by Mary Dillwyn circa 1853, was discussed in a Wikimedia Foundation blog in 2015.
- On social media, a man in a giraffe costume has been seen speeding past a family on a ski slope in Colorado posing for a picture, which is an example of a video photobomb.
- Prince Harry photobombed America's Next Top Model Winnie Harlow and her agent at a lunch after the Audi Polo Challenge.
- Paul McCartney photobombed fellow Beatle George Harrison and some female fans.
- Jack Black and Dustin Hoffman photobombed Angelina Jolie.
- Ed Sheeran, fan of Ipswich Town F.C., photobombed a Norwich City F.C. fan along with Adam Drury and Grant Holt.
