= Tshibinda =

Group of pyroclastic cones in the Democratic Republic of the Congo

- Location within Democratic Republic of the Congo

Highest point
- Elevation: 1,460 m (4,790 ft)
- Coordinates: 2°32′00″S 28°45′0″E

Geography
- Location: Democratic Republic of the Congo

Geology
- Formed by: Volcanism along the Albertine Rift
- Mountain type: Pyroclastic cones

Tshibinda is a group of pyroclastic cones in the east of the Democratic Republic of the Congo. It has a prominence of 1,460 metres (4,790 ft). It last erupted during the Pleistocene epoch.

== See also ==
- List of volcanoes in the Democratic Republic of the Congo
