= Nyamuragira =

Shield volcano in the Democratic Republic of the Congo

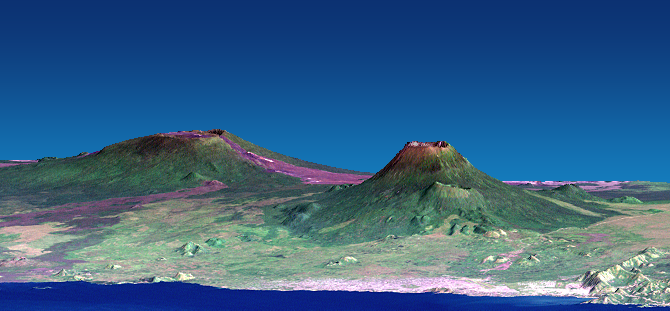
- Nyamuragira (left) and Nyiragongo (right). Vertical scale exaggerated (1.5×).

Highest point
- Elevation: 3,058 m (10,033 ft)
- Prominence: 784 m (2,572 ft)
- Coordinates: 1°24′44″S 29°12′11″E

Geography
- Location within Democratic Republic of the Congo
- Location: Nord-Kivu, Democratic Republic of the Congo
- Parent range: Virunga Mountains

Geology
- Formed by: Volcanism along the Albertine Rift
- Mountain type: Shield volcano
- Last eruption: September 10, 2024 (ongoing as of September 2025)

Nyamuragira, also known as Nyamulagira, is an active shield volcano in the Virunga Mountains of the Democratic Republic of the Congo, situated about 25 kilometres (16 mi) north of Lake Kivu. The name is derived from Mashi language.

It has been described as Africa's most active volcano and has erupted over 40 times since 1885. As well as eruptions from the summit, there have been numerous eruptions from the flanks of the volcano, creating new smaller volcanoes that have lasted only for a short time (e.g. Murara from late 1976 to 1977).

Recent eruptions occurred on 2 January 2010, 6 November 2011, and 23 May 2021.

== Geography and geology ==
Nyamuragira volcano is an active volcano near the city of Goma in the Democratic Republic of the Congo, situated about 25 kilometres (16 mi) north of Lake Kivu. It is in the Nord-Kivu Province. It is 13 kilometres (8.1 mi) north-north-west of Nyiragongo, the volcano which caused extensive damage to the city of Goma in its 2002 eruption.

Nyamuragira has a volume of 500 cubic kilometres (120 cu mi), and covers an area of 1,500 square kilometres (580 sq mi). It has a low shield profile and contrasts with adjacent steep-sided Nyiragongo volcano.

== Lava composition ==
Despite being only 13 km apart, Nyamuragira erupts very different lava than Mt. Nyiragongo. Instead of the ultrabasic, silica-poor, extremely fluid lava seen at Nyiragongo, Nyamuragira tends to erupt a more silica rich, high potassium, tephritic type of lava. Nyamuragira also releases substantially more sulfur dioxide than Nyiragongo . Nyamuragira releases 40-210 k/sec of sulfur dioxide while Nyiragongo averages 8-22 kg/s.

Most eruptions tend to begin along fissures and start with high fountain Hawaiian type eruptions. This is also where the majority of eruptive volume takes place. As the eruption continues, it transitions into more of a Strombolian type eruptions.

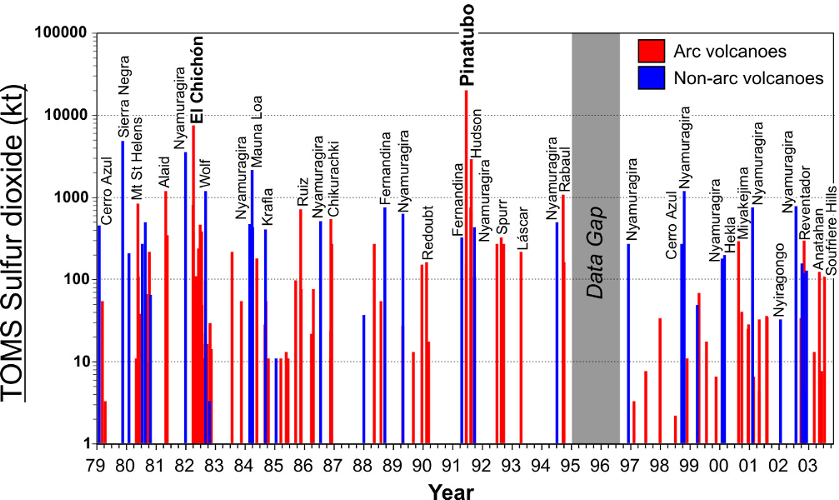
Sulfur dioxide emissions by volcanoes, 1979–2003.

Nyamuragira volcano is responsible for a large portion of the sulfur dioxide released into the atmosphere by volcanoes.

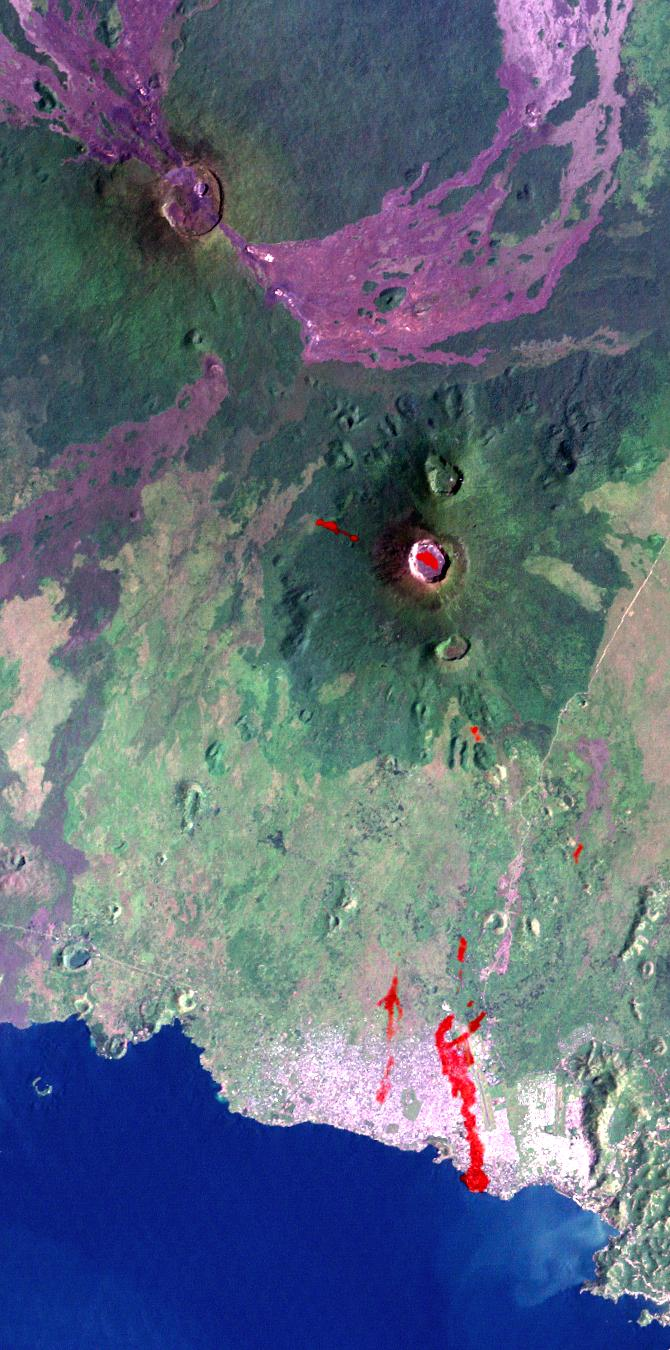
Lava flows from Nyamuragira (upper left) extend to Lake Kivu.

== Recent activity ==
=== 2010 eruption ===
At dawn on 2 January 2010 Nyamuragira began spewing out lava flows. There are no settlements close to the volcano, but wildlife officials feared that the eruption may threaten the chimpanzees in the area. Another danger was that the lava could have flowed into the southern sector of Virunga National Park, where there are settlements and villages.

Extensive lava flows from the 2010 eruption can be seen on satellite photographs reaching 25 kilometres (16 mi) south-west to Lake Kivu, about 22 kilometres (14 mi) north-west and 35 kilometres (22 mi) north-north-east.

=== 2011 eruption ===
The volcano erupted again on 5 November 2011.

That eruption produced a 400-metre (1,300 ft) high column of lava, and it is said to have been its largest eruption in 100 years.

=== 2014 lava lake ===
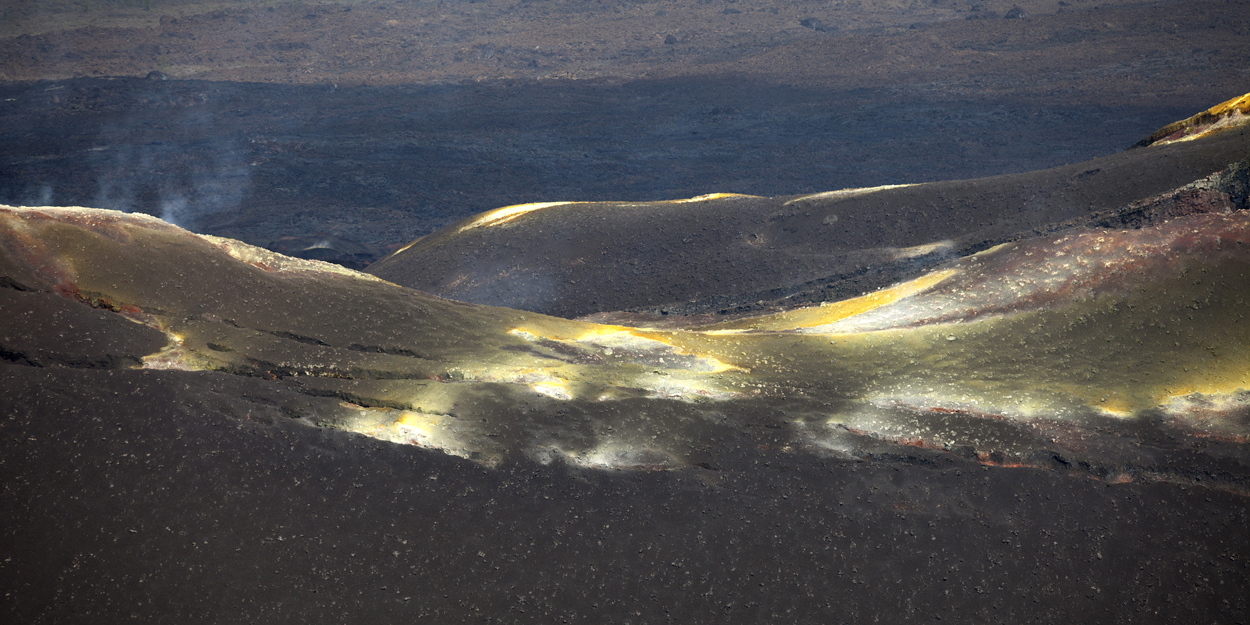
Part of crater of Nyamuragira volcano

In 2014, a new lava lake appeared at the volcano for the first time in 75 years. The previous lava lake at the volcano was emptied in the 1938 lava flow. The formation of the new lake occurred between June and August 2014. It reached a depth of 500 metres (1,600 ft). The eruption did not affect the communities in the area but left a lot of ash and air pollution. Sulfate aerosols formed by volcanic sulfur dioxide from the eruptions were observed as far away as over the central Amazon rain forest in South America. By 2018, the lava lake had hardened and the activity appeared to have stopped. Eruptive activity continues during 2021 at the summit caldera.

=== 2021 lava lake ===
In 2021, a lava lake appeared at the volcano based on a June 11 satellite image.

=== 2024 caldera overflow ===
On July 26, 2024, lava began to overflow the northern caldera rim and flowed towards the northwest. This was accompanied by a large increase in effusive lava output. The flow advanced 5 km in the first day.

=== 2026 eruption ===
On January 21, 2026, it was reported that an ongoing eruption was taking place at Nyamulagira. Incandescence was observed on the caldera floor and active lava flow up to 8 km from the crater rim. With reports from January 19, 2026, of lava flows extending as far as 10 km.

== Etymology ==
The name "Nyamulagira" originates from the Mashi, spoken by the Bashi people of the Kivu region. According to oral histories and traditional tales, it is derived from the verb kulagiriza, which means "to cause suffering"..

Oral traditions report that during the volcano's eruptions, local people would exclaim "Rwamalagiriza" or "Namalagiriza" to express their distress in the face of the disasters caused by lava flows. This phrase, passed down through stories, means "misfortune has befallen me" or "I am suffering". The evolution of "Rwamalagiriza" into "Nyamulagiriza" and finally into "Nyamulagira"—literally meaning "the one who causes suffering" to refer to the volcano—is documented in the accounts of local communities.

== See also ==
- List of volcanoes in the Democratic Republic of the Congo
- Mount Nyiragongo
