= Mount Nyiragongo =

Active volcano in the Democratic Republic of the Congo

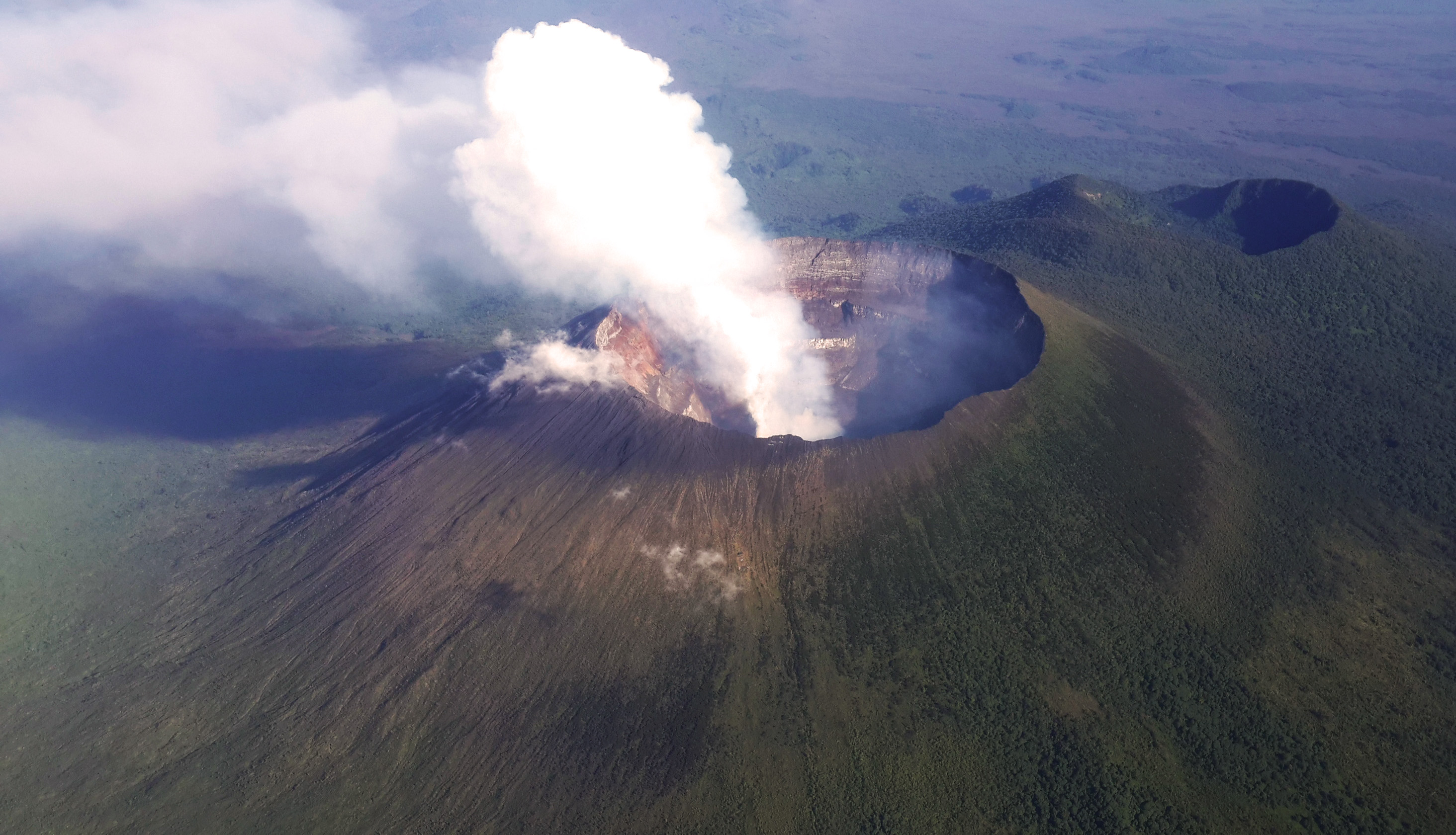
- Mount Nyiragongo viewed aerially in 2014

Highest point
- Elevation: 3,470 m (11,385 ft)
- Prominence: 1,443 m (4,734 ft)
- Listing: Ribu
- Coordinates: 1°31′19″S 29°14′58″E

Geography
- Location within Democratic Republic of the Congo
- Location: Democratic Republic of the Congo
- Parent range: Virunga Mountains

Geology
- Formed by: Volcanism along the Albertine Rift
- Mountain type: Stratovolcano
- Last eruption: 22 February 2024 – present

Mount Nyiragongo (/ˌnɪərəˈɡɒŋɡoʊ, -ˈɡɔːŋ-/ neer-ə-GONG-go) is an active stratovolcano with an elevation of 3,470 m (11,385 ft) in the Virunga Mountains associated with the Albertine Rift. It is located inside Virunga National Park, in the North Kivu province in the Democratic Republic of the Congo, about 12 km (7.5 mi) north of the town of Goma and Lake Kivu and just 9.8 km (6.1mi) west of the border with Rwanda. The main crater is about two kilometres (1 mi) wide and usually contains a lava lake. The crater presently has two distinct cooled lava benches within the crater walls – one at about 3,175 m (10,417 ft) and a lower one at about 2,975 m (9,760 ft).

Nyiragongo's lava lake has at times been the most voluminous known lava lake in most recent history. The depth of the lava lake varies considerably. A maximum elevation of the lava lake was recorded at about 3,250 m (10,660 ft) prior to the January 1977 eruption – a lake depth of about 600 m (2,000 ft). Following the January 2002 eruption, the lava lake was recorded at a low of about 2,600 m (8,500 ft), or 900 m (3,000 ft) below the rim. The level has gradually risen since then. Nyiragongo and nearby Nyamuragira are together responsible for 40% of Africa's historical volcanic eruptions.

== Geology ==
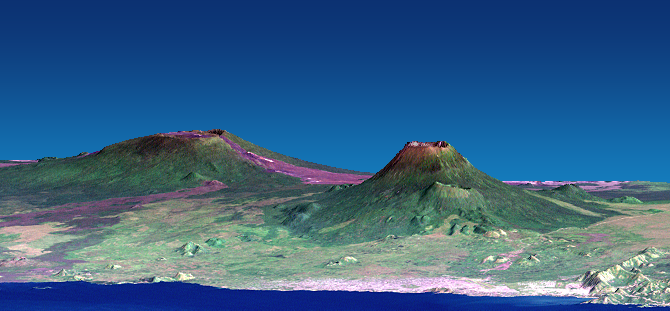
Nyamuragira (left) and Nyiragongo (right). Vertical scale exaggerated (1.5×).

The volcano partly overlaps with two older volcanoes, Baruta and Shaheru, and is also surrounded by hundreds of small volcanic cinder cones from flank eruptions.

Nyiragongo's cone consists of pyroclastics and lava flows. Nyiragongo's lavas are low-silica, alkali-rich, ultrabasic extrusive rocks essentially free of feldspars. They range from olivine-rich melilitites through leucites to nephelinites, containing, in various proportions mainly the minerals nepheline, leucite, melilite, kalsilite, and clinopyroxene. This very low silica composition results in eruptions with unusually fluid flows. Whereas most lava flows move rather slowly and rarely pose a danger to human life, Nyiragongo's lava flows may race downhill at up to 100 km/h (60 mph).

== Active history ==
Not much is known about how long the volcano has been erupting, but it has erupted at least 34 times since 1882, including many periods where activity was continuous for years at a time, often in the form of a churning lava lake in the crater. The existence of the lava lake had been suspected for some time but was not scientifically confirmed until 1948. At that time, it was measured at nearly 120,000 square metres (1.3×10^{6} ft^{2}). Subsequent expeditions showed that the lake fluctuated in size, depth, and temperature over time.

The lava lake activity is ongoing. As of 2020, the lake is mostly confined within a broad, steep-sided cinder cone (roughly 18 m (60 ft) high by 180 m (600 ft) wide) on the crater floor.

=== 1977 eruption ===
Between 1894 and 1977 the crater contained an active lava lake. On 10 January 1977, the crater walls fractured, and the lava lake drained in less than an hour. The lava flowed down the flanks of the volcano at speeds of up to 60 km/h (37 mph) on the upper slopes, the fastest lava flow recorded to date, overwhelming villages and killing at least 50 people in the villages of Kibati and Moniki, according to reports made at the time.

Within 30 minutes, the lava lake had emptied, with the fluid lava rapidly flowing north, south, and west of the volcano. Nyiragongo's proximity to heavily populated areas increases its potential for causing a natural disaster. The 1977 eruption raised awareness of the unique dangers posed by Nyiragongo, and because of this, in 1991 it was designated a Decade Volcano, worthy of particular study.

The 1977 eruption was preceded by the creation of a new small volcanic vent, Murara, a short distance away on the slopes of Nyamuragira.

=== 2002 eruption ===
Lava lakes reformed in the crater in eruptions in 1982–1983 and 1994. Another major eruption of the volcano began on 17 January 2002, after several months of increased seismic and fumarolic activity. A 13-kilometre (8.1 mi) fissure opened in the south flank of the volcano, spreading in a few hours from 2,800 to 1,550 metres (9,190 to 5,090 ft) elevation and reaching the outskirts of the city of Goma, the provincial capital on the northern shore of Lake Kivu. Lava streamed from three spatter cones at the end of the fissure and flowed in a stream 200 to 1,000 metres (660 to 3,280 ft) wide and up to 2 metres (7 ft) deep through Goma. Warnings had been given and 400,000 people were evacuated from the city across the Rwandan border into neighbouring Gisenyi during the eruption. Lava covered the northern end of the runway at Goma International Airport, leaving the southern two-thirds usable, and reached Lake Kivu. This raised fears that the lava might cause gas-saturated waters deep in the lake to suddenly rise to the surface, releasing lethally large amounts of carbon dioxide and methane – similar to the disaster at Lake Nyos in Cameroon in 1986. This did not happen, but volcanologists continue to monitor the area closely.

About 245 people died in the eruption from asphyxiation by carbon dioxide and buildings collapsing due to the lava and earthquakes. Lava covered 13 percent of Goma, about 1.8 square miles (4.7 km^{2}), and nearly 120,000 people were left homeless.

Immediately after the eruption stopped, a large number of earthquakes were felt around Goma and Gisenyi. This swarm activity continued for about three months and caused the collapse of more buildings.

Six months after the start of the 2002 eruption, there were signs of a possible eruption, but no eruption happened.

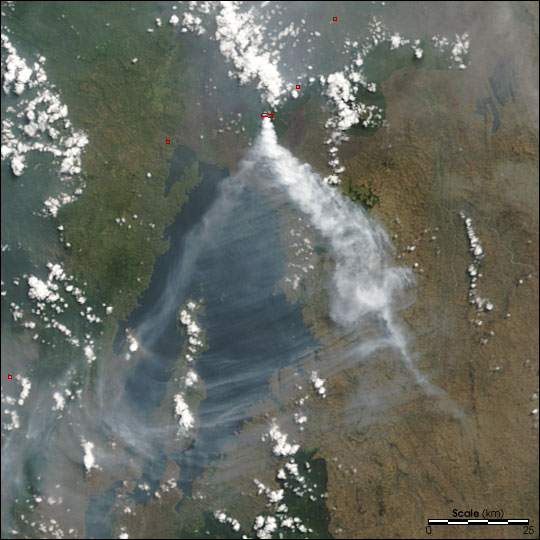
Satellite image of the eruption plume from Nyiragongo in July 2004

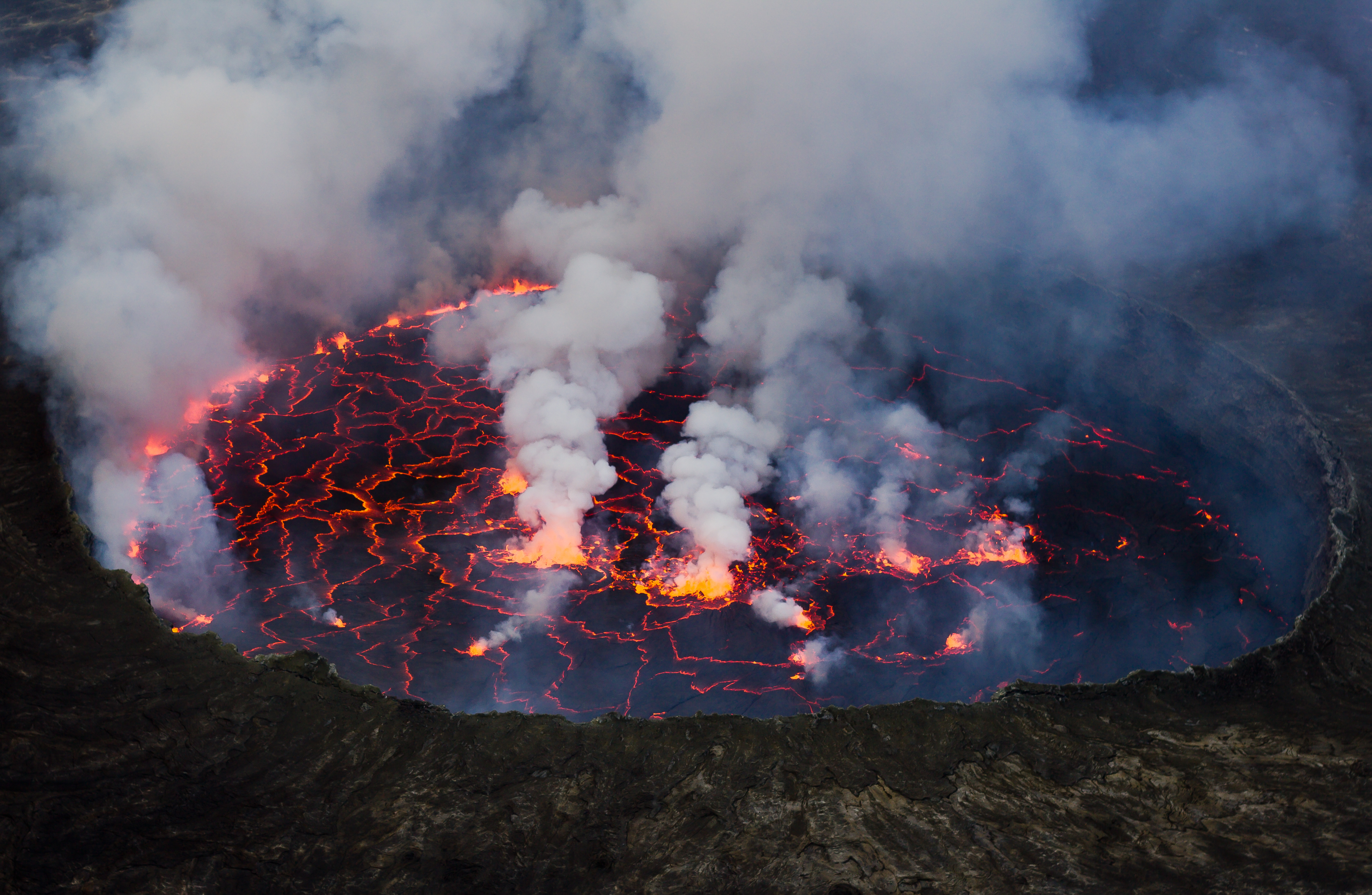
Mount Nyiragongo's lava lake

=== Mazuku ===
Localized carbon dioxide toxicity, known locally as 'mazuku', has killed livestock and children even more recently. In locations where the gas seeps from the ground at relatively high levels, without the dispersing effects of wind, its effects can be deadly. On 8 March 2016, Goma Volcano Observatory discovered a new vent that opened in the northeast edge of the crater, following local reports of rumblings coming from the volcano. Some fear that this could lead to a flank eruption. Observers in 2020 witnessed a rise in the lava lake and other signs of an impending eruption.

=== 2021 eruption ===
An eruption began on 22 May 2021, almost two decades after the last major eruption in 2002. Lava approached the Goma airport and moved towards the city centre of eastern Goma. The N2 road was cut off by the lava. It was later confirmed by the North Kivu province's military governor that the eruption was at around 7:00 P.M. local time. A highway to Beni was cut off by lava, and authorities urged residents from the city of Goma to evacuate, causing thousands of people to leave their homes. There was also an electricity cut across large areas following the eruption. As of 25 May 2021, 17 villages and around 1,000 homes were destroyed. As of 27 May 2021, 37 people were missing and presumed dead, after a lava flow reached the outskirts of the city of Goma. The eruption resulted in at least 32 deaths, mostly caused by car crashes in the ensuing evacuation.

== Monitoring ==
Satellite image of Nyiragongo's lava lake in July 2018

The volcano is continuously monitored by a team of scientists at the Goma Volcanic Observatory (GVO), with seismic data produced every four minutes and temperature data produced every ten minutes. Continued funding for the GVO is in doubt, as the World Bank decided in 2020 to terminate its contributions.

== War ==
In 2023, the volcano was taken over by the March 23 Movement during the initial M23 campaign. During this time, most of the eastern portion of the volcano was deforested. As of 2026, the March 23 Movement holds the volcano deep within the area they have taken over.

== See also ==
- Decade Volcanoes
- List of volcanic eruptions by death toll
- List of volcanoes in the Democratic Republic of the Congo
