= Lists of volcanoes =

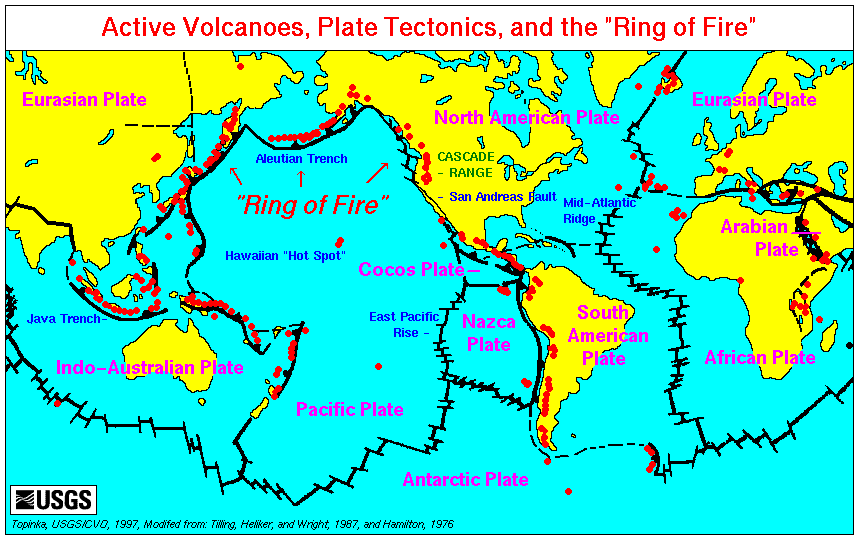
Map of Earth's plate boundaries and active volcanoes

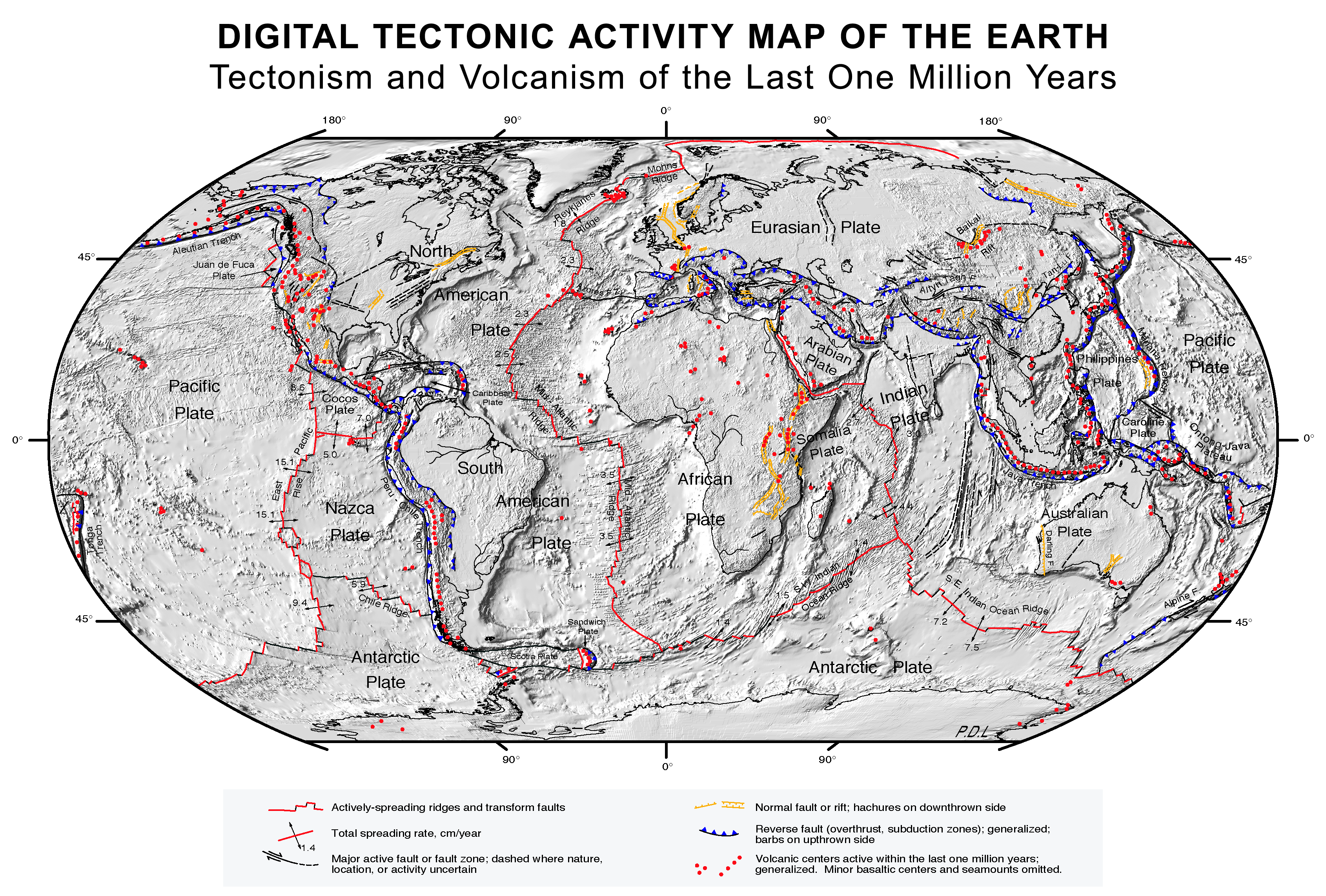
More detailed map showing volcanoes active in the last 1 million years

These lists cover volcanoes by type and by location.

== Type ==
- Active volcano
- List of crater lakes
- List of extraterrestrial volcanoes
- List of largest volcanic eruptions
- List of shield volcanoes
- List of stratovolcanoes
- List of volcanoes by elevation....

== Location ==
=== Africa ===
- List of volcanoes in Algeria
- List of volcanoes in Cameroon
- List of volcanoes in Cape Verde
- List of volcanoes in Chad
- List of volcanoes in the Comoros
- List of volcanoes in the Democratic Republic of the Congo
- List of volcanoes in Djibouti
- List of volcanoes in Equatorial Guinea
- List of volcanoes in Eritrea
- List of volcanoes in Ethiopia
- List of volcanoes in Kenya
- List of volcanoes in Libya
- List of volcanoes in Madagascar
- List of volcanoes of Mauritius
- In Nigeria all the volcanoes are in the Biu Plateau
- List of volcanoes in Réunion
- List of volcanoes in Rwanda
- São Tomé and Príncipe has only one volcano, Pico de São Tomé
- List of volcanoes in South Africa
- List of volcanoes in Sudan
- List of volcanoes in Tanzania
- List of volcanoes in Uganda

=== Americas ===
- List of volcanoes in Argentina
- List of volcanoes in Bolivia
- List of volcanoes in Brazil
- List of volcanoes in Canada
- List of volcanoes in the Caribbean
- List of volcanoes in Chile
- List of volcanoes in Colombia
- List of volcanoes in Costa Rica
- List of volcanoes in Dominica
- List of volcanoes in the Dutch Caribbean
- List of volcanoes in Ecuador
- List of volcanoes in El Salvador
- List of volcanoes in Grenada
- Guadeloupe has only one recognized volcano, La Grande Soufrière
- List of volcanoes in Guatemala
- List of volcanoes in Hawaii
- List of volcanoes in Honduras
- Martinique has only one recognized volcano, Mount Pelée
- List of volcanoes in Mexico
- List of volcanoes in Montserrat
- List of volcanoes in Nicaragua
- List of volcanoes in Panama
- List of volcanoes in Peru
- List of volcanoes in Saint Kitts and Nevis
- List of volcanoes in Saint Lucia
- List of volcanoes in Saint Vincent and the Grenadines
- List of volcanoes in the United States
- Venezuela has no recognized volcanoes.

=== Asia ===
- List of volcanoes in Afghanistan
- List of volcanoes in Azerbaijan
- List of volcanoes in Cambodia
- List of volcanoes in China
- List of volcanoes in India
- List of volcanoes in Indonesia
- List of volcanoes in Iran
- The only known volcanoes in areas under Israeli rule are in the Golan Heights.
- List of volcanoes in Japan
- List of volcanoes in Korea
- List of volcanoes in Malaysia
- List of volcanoes in Mongolia
- List of volcanoes in Myanmar
- List of volcanoes in Pakistan
- List of volcanoes in the Philippines
- List of volcanoes in Russia (Asian parts)
- List of volcanoes in Saudi Arabia
- List of volcanoes in Syria
- List of volcanoes in Taiwan
- List of volcanoes in Thailand
- List of volcanoes in Vietnam
- List of volcanoes in Yemen

=== Europe ===
- List of volcanoes in Europe
- List of volcanoes in Armenia
- List of volcanoes in France
- List of volcanoes in Germany
- List of volcanoes in Georgia (country)
- List of volcanoes in Greece
- List of volcanoes in Iceland
- List of volcanoes in Italy
- List of volcanoes in the Netherlands
- List of volcanoes in North Macedonia
- List of volcanoes in Norway
- List of volcanoes in Poland
- List of volcanoes in Portugal
- List of volcanoes in the Republic of Ireland
- The only dormant volcano in Romania is Ciomad.
- List of volcanoes in Russia (European section)
- List of volcanoes in Spain
- List of volcanoes in Turkey
- List of volcanoes in the United Kingdom

=== Oceania, Atlantic and Pacific Oceans, and Antarctica ===
- List of volcanoes in Antarctica
- List of volcanoes in Ascension Island
- List of volcanoes in Australia
- List of volcanoes in Fiji
- List of volcanoes in French Polynesia
- List of volcanoes in French Southern and Antarctic Lands
- List of volcanoes in New Zealand
- List of volcanoes in the Pacific Ocean
- List of volcanoes in Papua New Guinea
- List of volcanoes in Samoa
- List of volcanoes in Solomon Islands
- List of volcanoes in South Sandwich Islands
- List of volcanoes in Tristan da Cunha
- List of volcanoes in Tonga
- List of volcanoes in Vanuatu
- List of volcanoes in Wallis Islands

=== Extraterrestrial ===
- List of extraterrestrial volcanoes

== See also ==
- Global Volcanism Program of the Smithsonian Institution
