= Eifel hotspot =

Volcanic hotspot in western Germany

Coordinates: 50°12′N 6°42′E

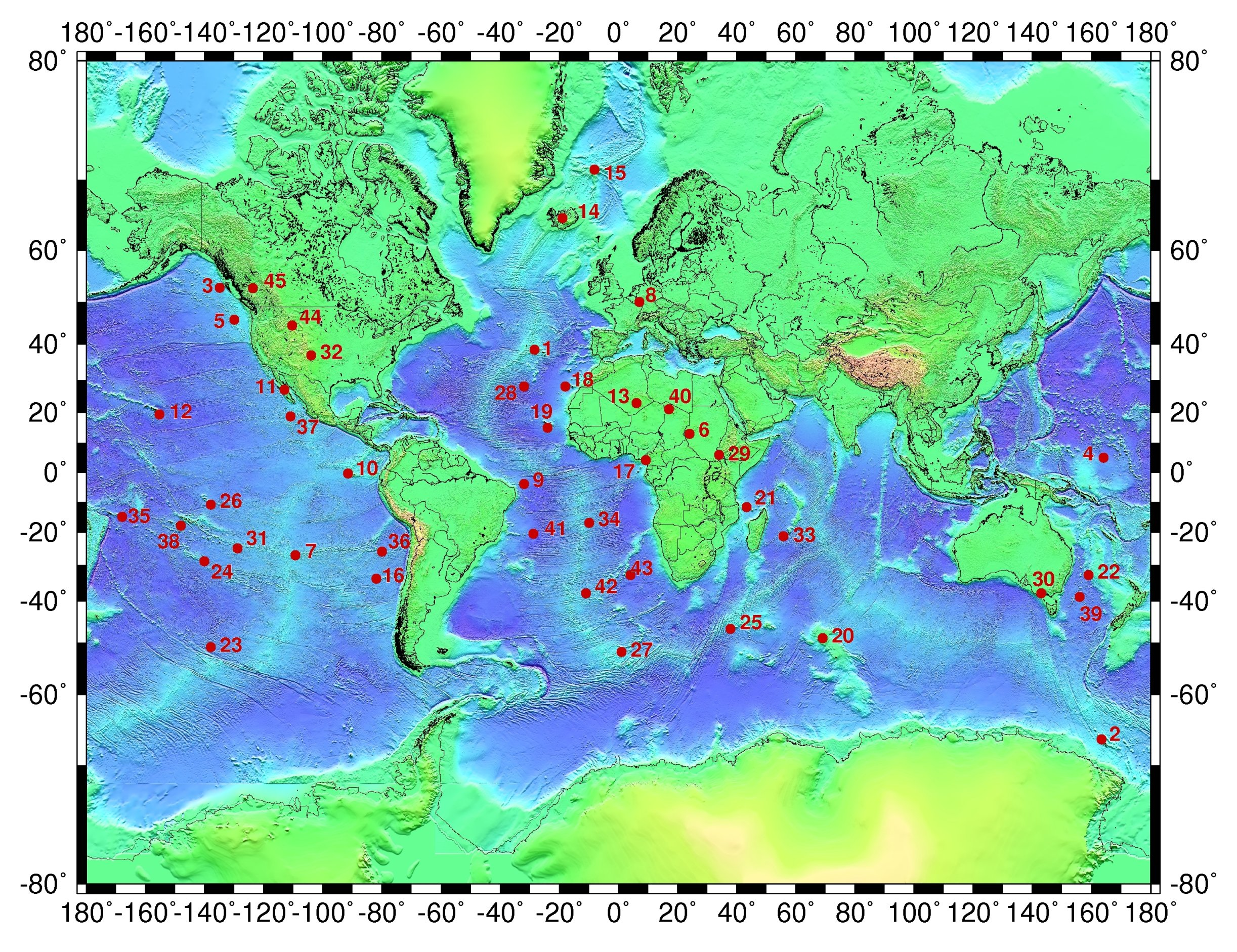
This map shows postulated volcanic hotspots on Earth. The Eifel hotspot is marked 8.

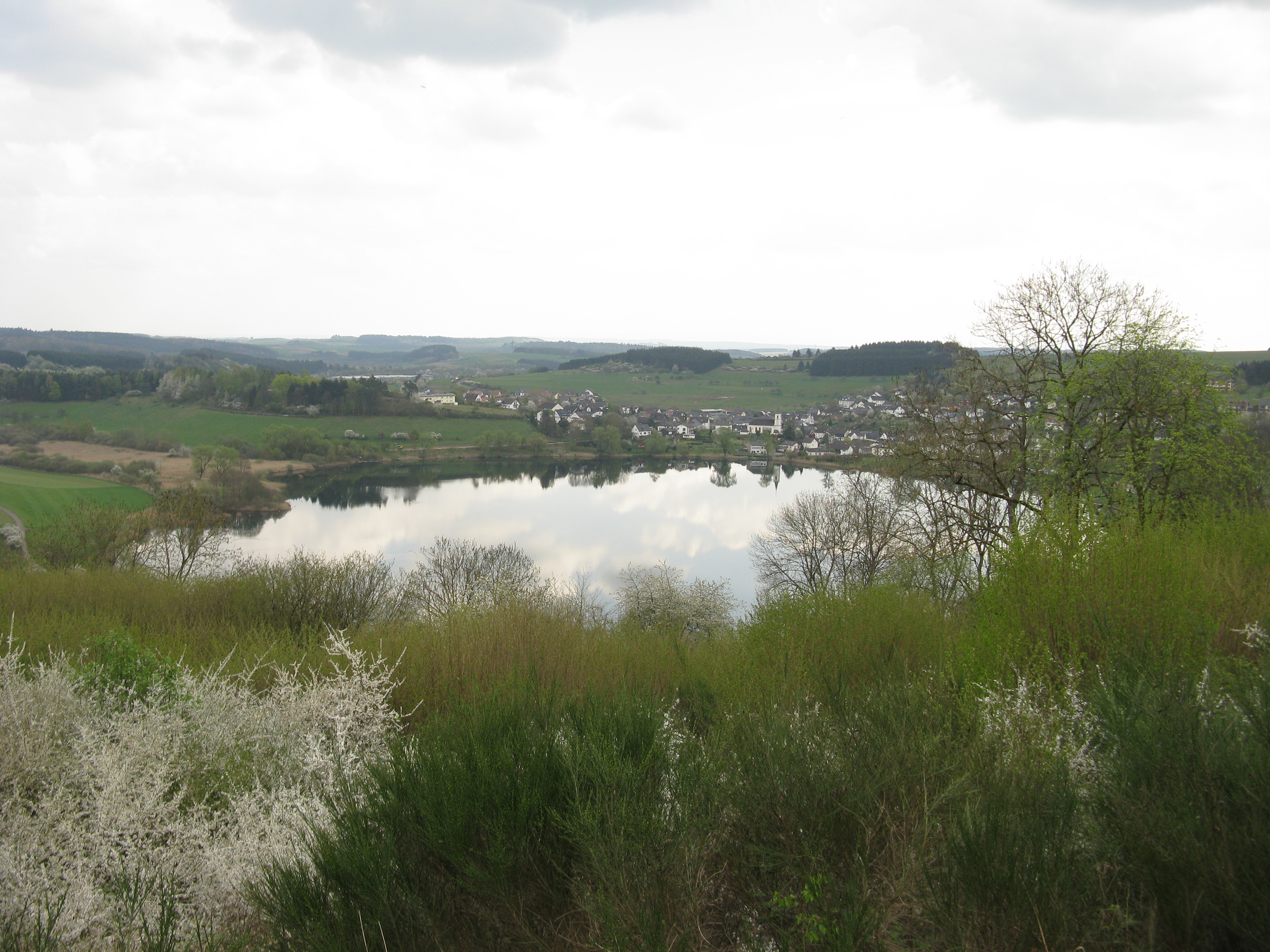
Schalkenmehrener Maar lake in the Eifel mountain range. The maar was formed by a volcanic eruption 10,500 years ago.

The Eifel hotspot is a volcanic hotspot in western Germany. It is one of many recent volcanic formations in and around the Eifel mountain range and includes the volcanic field known as Volcanic Eifel. Although the last eruption occurred around 10,000 years ago, the presence of escaping volcanic gases in the region indicates that it is still weakly active.

There are two competing theories concerning the origin of volcanic activity in the area. The conventional view is that the province is underlain by a mantle plume. Support for a plume origin includes petrological, geochemical, and isotopic evidence indicating a deep-mantle source, seismic anomalies in the upper and lower mantle, and geodetic evidence of large-scale uplift and extension which suggests a buoyant plume.

Recently, some scientists have highlighted that certain characteristics associated with mantle plumes such as precursory uplift, time-progressive volcanism, and continuity between seismic anomalies in the upper and lower mantle are lacking. They have thus argued instead for a tectonic origin consisting of passive melting due to lithospheric and crustal extension and shallow convective processes involving the ongoing subduction of the Eurasian Plate as part of the Alpine orogeny.

== See also ==
- List of volcanic regions postulated to be hotspots
- List of volcanoes in Europe
- List of volcanoes in Germany
