= Vakak Group =

Volcanic field near Kabul, Afghanistan

- Location within Afghanistan

Highest point
- Elevation: 3,190 m (10,470 ft)
- Listing: Volcanoes of Afghanistan
- Coordinates: 34°15′N 67°58′E

Geography
- Country: Afghanistan

Geology
- Rock age: Pleistocene
- Mountain type: Volcanic field

The Vakak Group (also spelled Wakak) is a small volcanic field located WSW of Kabul, Afghanistan. It consists of 18 dacitic and trachytic volcanoes including lava domes and possibly an old caldera.

== See also ==
- Lists of volcanoes
