= San Joaquin (Equatorial Guinea) =

Volcano in Equatorial Guinea

- Pico Biao; Pico do Moka
- Location within Equatorial Guinea

Highest point
- Elevation: 2,009 m (6,591 ft)
- Coordinates: 3.35°N 8.63°E

Geography
- Location: Bioko, Equatorial Guinea

Geology
- Mountain type: Shield volcano
- Last eruption: Unknown

San Joaquin is a forested basaltic shield volcano forming the southeastern corner of Equatorial Guinea's Bioko. The geologic history of San Joaquin is poorly known, but the International Association of Volcanology and Chemistry of the Earth's Interior has classified the volcano as having been active in the last 2,000 years.

San Joaquin was known as Pico Biaó before Spanish colonization of the island. It is the second-lowest volcano in Equatorial Guinea, ahead of Mount Fijelvingue, at 1,500 meters. It occupies a space of 301 cubic kilometers, and has an ovular summit with a lake, as well as a crater lake formed on the northeast of the volcano. On average, it inclines at 13.6 degrees, though the northern end has steep saddle formations, which is averaged by the eastern end, which flattens as much as 5 degrees. It has the most complex geologic patterns out of the volcanoes on Bioko, due to 59 faults intersecting it.

== See also ==
- List of volcanoes in Equatorial Guinea
