= Dacht-i-Navar Group =

Volcanic field in Afghanistan

Coordinates: 33.95°N 67.92°E

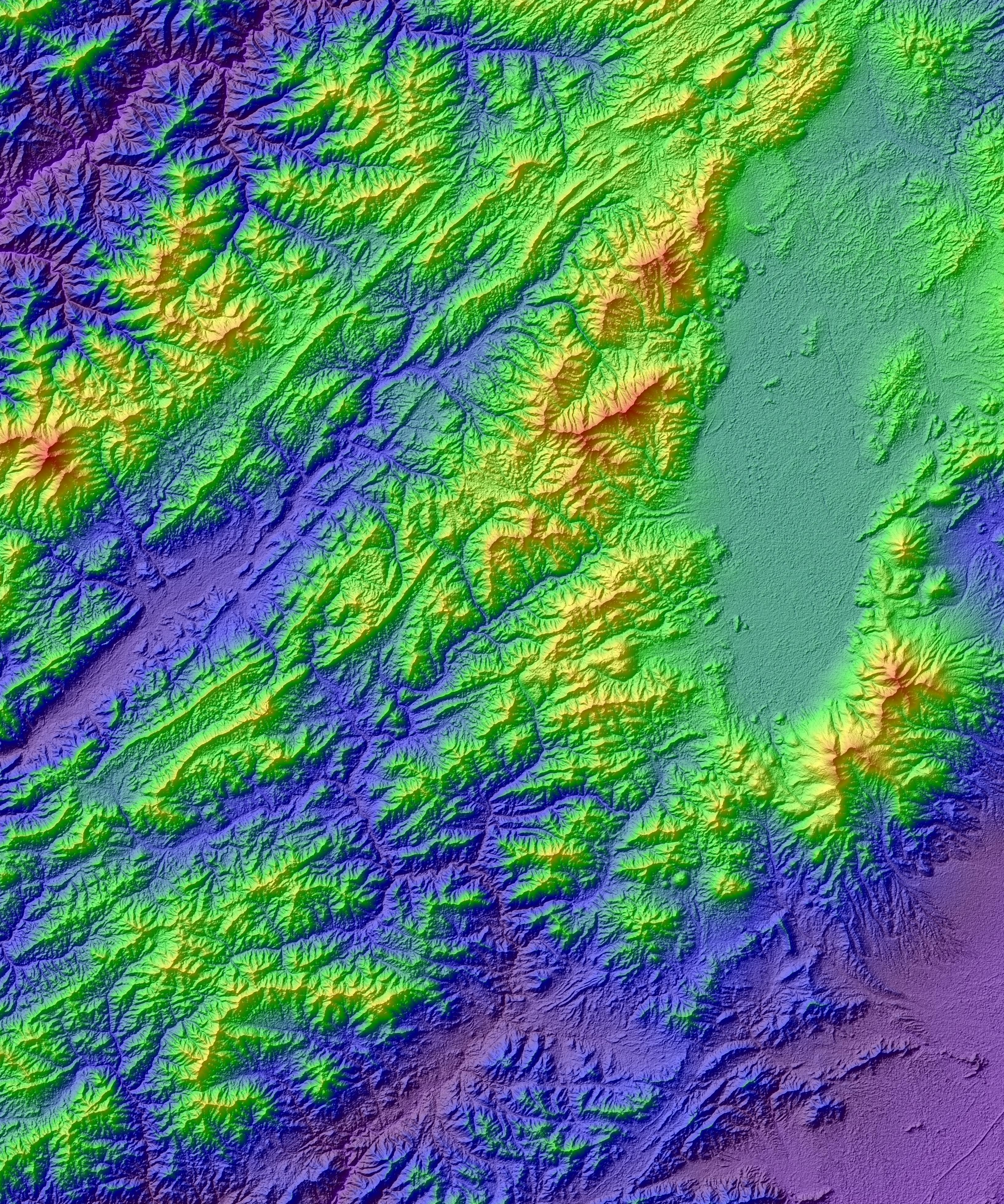
The depression that Dacht-i-Navar is situated in forms the upper right part of the image

The Dacht-i-Navar Group is a volcanic field in Afghanistan. It consists of a group of lava domes and stratovolcanoes at the southern end of the Dacht-i-Navar depression and partly extends north of the same depression. They were active during the Pliocene and Pleistocene.

== Geography and geology ==
Dacht-i-Navar lies southwest of Kabul, about one third the way to Kandahar. The city of Ghazni is about 50 kilometres (31 mi) east of Dacht-i-Navar.

=== Geological context ===
In 1969, the history of volcanism in Afghanistan was poorly known. Only a few volcanic fields of Pliocene-Quaternary age exist in Afghanistan. Aside from orogen-associated volcanism, volcanism typical of rifting zones is also found. Magma production through the Pliocene-Pleistocene has been low and volcanoes cover only small areas.

=== The complex itself ===
Dacht-i-Navar is formed by over ten central volcanoes that form lava sheets and tuffs stacked on top of each other. These central volcanoes form heavily degraded stratovolcanoes, the largest of which (4,559 metres (14,957 ft) high Mamikala and 4,312 metres (14,147 ft) high Zarkadak) are over 10 kilometres (6.2 mi) wide at the base, and are cut by ravines that end in alluvial fans and previously channelled nuee ardentes. They also display traces of glacial activity which bury most of the edifices.

These two centres lie in the south of the group; Ghiftu, Khut and Sewak are also located in the south while 3,555 metres (11,663 ft) high Kotale Reg and 3,920 metres (12,860 ft) high Qaghkusta lie in the east. The Doni Yarchi massif lies in the north. Other volcanic centres are Mount Burguk, Mount Hut and Mount Mohammad, in total over 24 individual centres were found.

The highest of these centres exceed 4,500 metres (14,800 ft) of altitude. Some of these volcanoes still display craters. Extrusive bodies such as lava domes are also found, as well as two calderas associated with stratovolcanoes. Smaller centres sometimes also have central calderas with extrusive domes, some of these calderas reach diameters of 2–3 kilometres (1.2–1.9 mi).

The Dacht-i-Navar group lies mainly within the southern part of a geological depression with dimensions of 100 by 30 kilometres (62 mi × 19 mi). The few more northern centres are separated from the main complex by the clay-filled Nawar basin and a surrounding Pleistocene terrace. The infill, which includes volcanic material, is likely thicker than 100 metres (330 ft). This basin has an altitude of 3,125 metres (10,253 ft), but it is surrounded by higher summits. Despite evaporation, a lake persists within the basin. Probably, the depression was once a valley cut into schists which are pre-Devonian and still crop out in some places. This valley drained southwestward towards the Arghandab River that was eventually blocked by volcanic activity. The Ab-i-Khanduli dry valley still connects Dacht-i-Navar to the Arghandab river. Another possibility is that the valley originally drained eastward towards Qarabagh.

Metamorphic rocks of Paleozoic age form the basement. Additional volcanic centres are found both west and east of Dacht-i-Navar. The volcanism appears to be associated with left-lateral strike-slip faulting in the area.

=== Petrology ===
The field has erupted andesite and dacite. The dacites are found in the lower parts and the andesites in the upper part of the volcanic deposits; some rhyodacites and rhyolites are found among the oldest rocks. The rocks have a porphyric nature and phenocrysts include amphibole, biotite, clinopyroxene, magnetite, olivine, orthopyroxene, plagioclase and quartz, with different rock types having different composition. Chemically, the rocks belong to the calc-alkaline series.

Dacht-i-Navar is a source of obsidian, one of the few in Southwest Asia. Some Paleolithic archeological sites in the area have used this obsidian. This obsidian does not appear to have been transported to large distances from Dacht-i-Nawar.

== Eruptive history ==
Potassium-argon dating has yielded ages of 2.7–2.8 million years ago for the dacites. Quaternary pebbles lie on top of the andesites. The Zarkadak volcano was active 1.68–1.59 million years ago. One eruption deposit of Mamikala has a volume of over 10 cubic kilometres (2.4 cu mi). Volcanic activity involved the eruption of ignimbrites followed by the extrusion of lava domes. Volcanic activity at Dacht-i-Navar was accompanied by the activity of hot springs that deposited travertine.

Dacht-i-Navar is considered to be the source of volcanic ash layers found in the Sivalik Hills that were erupted 2.31 ± 0.84 to 2.8 ± 0.56 million years ago. Such tephra deposits have been reported from Jammu in India and Chandigarh in India, sometimes about 1,000 kilometres (620 mi) away from Dacht-i-Navar.

The age of the last eruption is unknown. No SO_{2} emissions from this volcanic group have been detected over Pakistan, but hot springs are still active in the Dacht-i-Navar basin.

== See also ==
- List of volcanoes in Afghanistan
- Lists of volcanoes
