= List of volcanoes in Brazil =

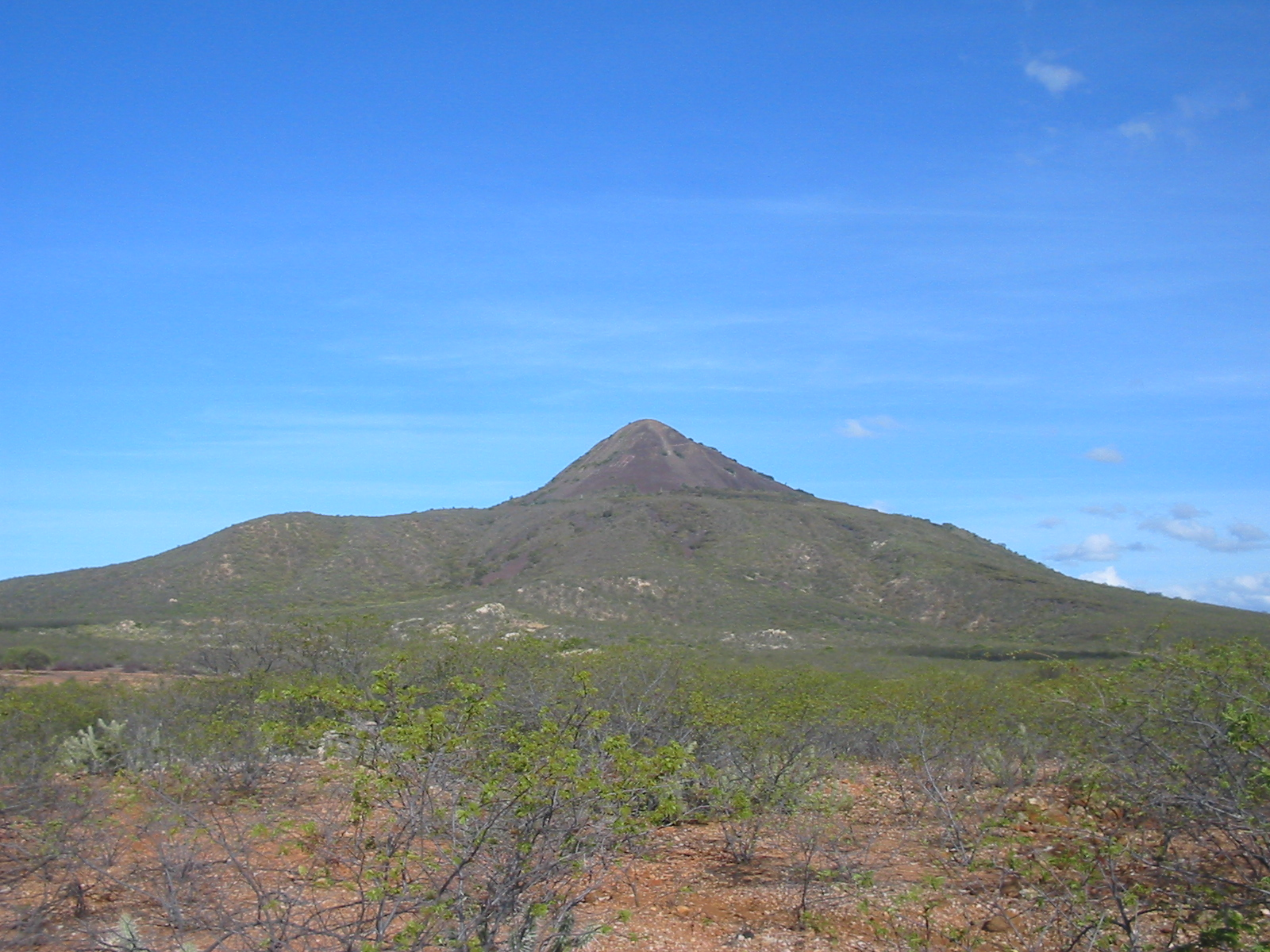
Pico do Cabugi in the state of Rio Grande do Norte.

This is a list of volcanoes in Brazil. Because Brazil does not have any active volcanoes, this list includes only extinct Brazilian volcanoes.

Additionally, a volcano was hypothesized to exist in the Nova Iguaçu area, in Rio de Janeiro, and was called the Nova Iguaçu Volcano. As of 2021, the scientific consensus is that it is not a volcano.

== Volcanoes ==
Name	Type	Elevation		Location	Last eruption
Name	Type	meters	feet	Coordinates	Last eruption
Trindade and Martin Vaz	Stratovolcano	600	1968	20.514°S 29.331°W	Pleistocene
Pico do Cabugi	?	590	1940	5.70611°S 36.32083°W	?
Morro do Pico, in Fernando de Noronha	?	323	1060	3.83972°S 32.41472°W	?
Grupo Serra Geral	Hydrovolcano	?	?	?	?
Grupo Uatumã (Formação Sobreiro and Formação Santa Rosa)	?	?	?	?	?

== Bibliography ==
- Venzke, E., ed. (2013). "Trindade (385051) in Volcanoes of the World". Global Volcanism Program, v. 4.10.0. Smithsonian Institution. doi:10.5479/si.GVP.VOTW4-2013.
- "Geólogos da Mineropar descobrem centro de erupção vulcânica em Cruz Machado". Agência Estadual de Notícias do Paraná. 3 May 2011.
- Juliani, Caetano; Fernandes, Carlos Marcello Dias (1 April 2010). "Well-preserved Late Paleoproterozoic volcanic centers in the São Félix do Xingu region, Amazonian Craton, Brazil". Journal of Volcanology and Geothermal Research. 191 (3–4): 167–179. doi:10.1016/j.jvolgeores.2010.01.016.
- Ferreira, Ana Tayla Rodrigues; Lamarão, Cláudio Nery (March 2013). "Geologia, petrografia e geoquímica das rochas vulcânicas Uatumã na área sul de São Félix do Xingu (PA), Província Carajás". Brazilian Journal of Geology (in Brazilian Portuguese). 43 (1). São Paulo: 152–167. doi:10.5327/Z2317-48892013000100013. ISSN 2317-4889.
