= Sharat Kovakab =

Volcanic field in Syria

- جبل كوكب
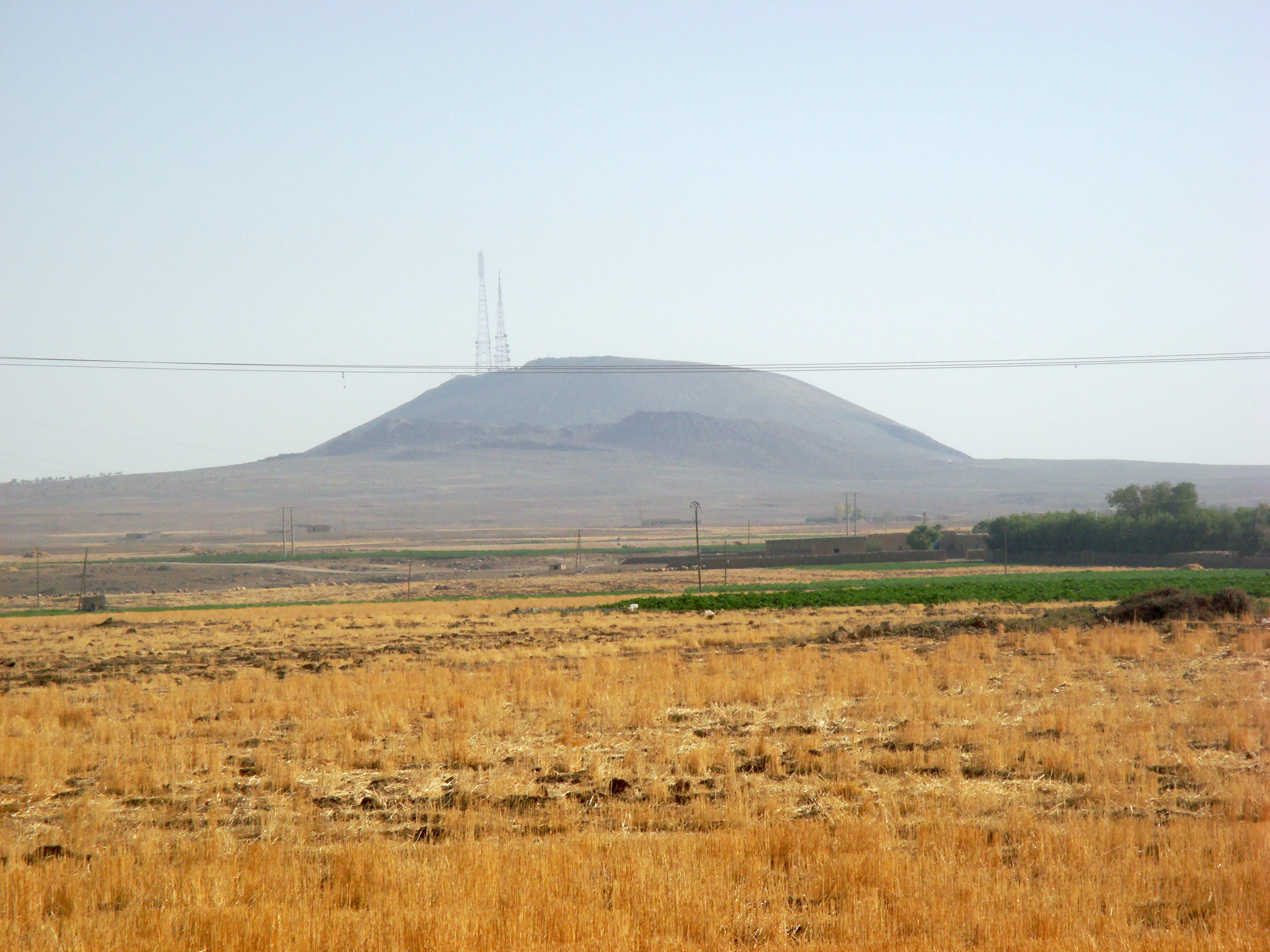
- Two basaltic cones in Sharat Kovakab volcanic field, near Al Hasakah, Syria. The second cone is located in the foreground, lower than the main cone.

Highest point
- Elevation: 1,752 feet (534 m)
- Listing: Volcanoes of Syria
- Coordinates: 36.53°N 40.85°E

Geography
- Location within Syria
- Location: Al-Hasakah, Syria

Geology
- Rock age: Holocene
- Mountain type: Volcanic field
- Last eruption: Unknown

Climbing
- Easiest route: a small road ascending to the peak

Sharat Kovakab (Arabic: جبل كوكب) is a volcanic field in Syria.

== See also ==
- List of volcanic fields
