= Duvalo =

Active Macedonian geothermal surface

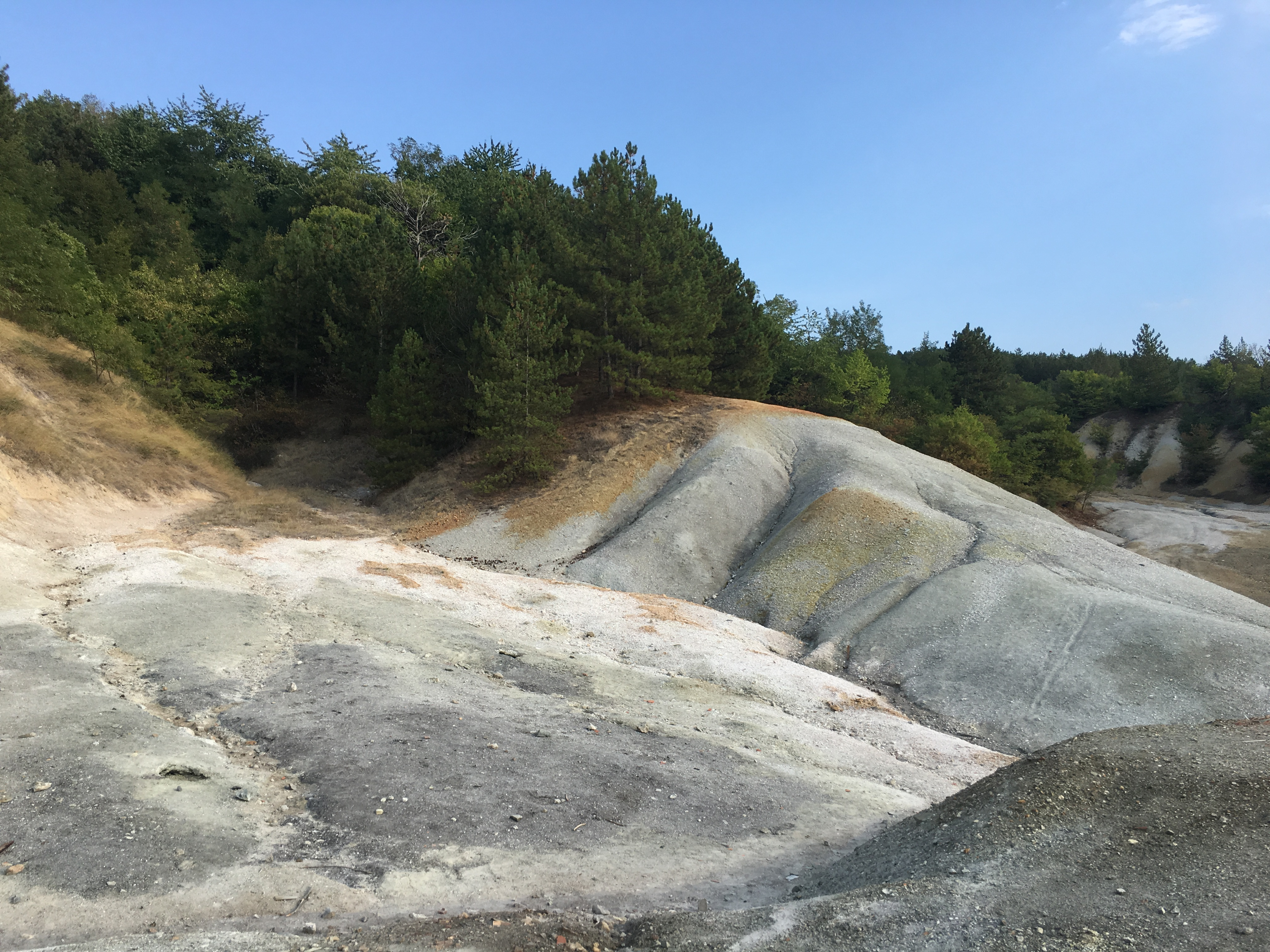
View of Duvalo, near village Kosel

Duvalo (Macedonian: Дувало) is an active geothermal surface feature situated close to the village of Kosel, near Lake Ohrid in the southwest of North Macedonia. Located at 740 metres (2,430 ft) above the sea level, it resembles a miniature crater with a diameter of 50 metres (160 ft) and a depth of 30 metres (98 ft). Gaseous carbon dioxide and sulfur dioxide are released from the hole (therefore making it both a fumarole and a mofetta), and the smell of sulfur is said to be felt in a 3-kilometre (1.9 mi) radius around it. It represents the last traces of the historically significant volcanic activity in the area. During the Ottoman Empire it was used to mine sulfur.

On 28 May 2014 "significant amount of smoke" was emitted by the feature, a historic first.

== Gallery ==
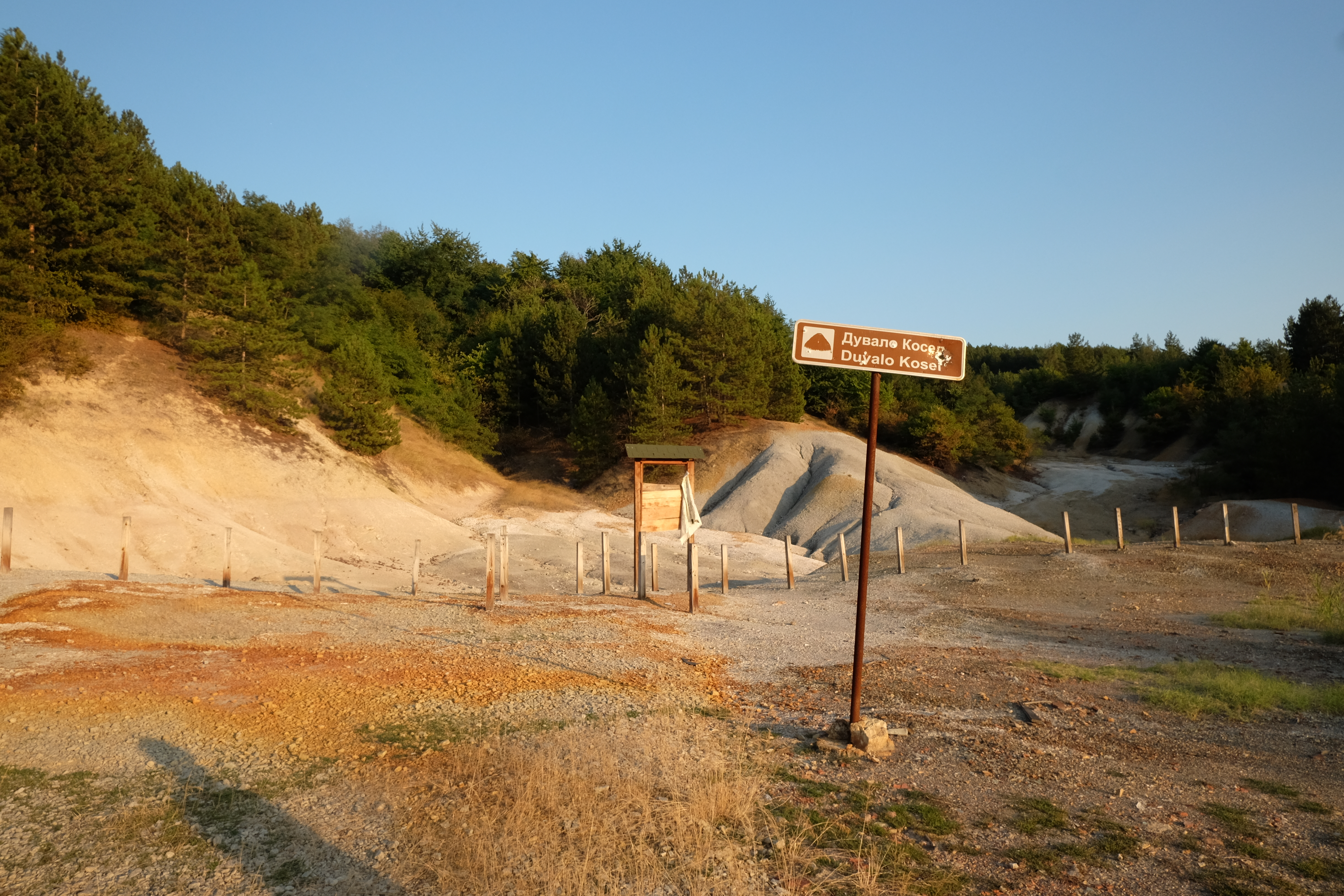
Duvalo.

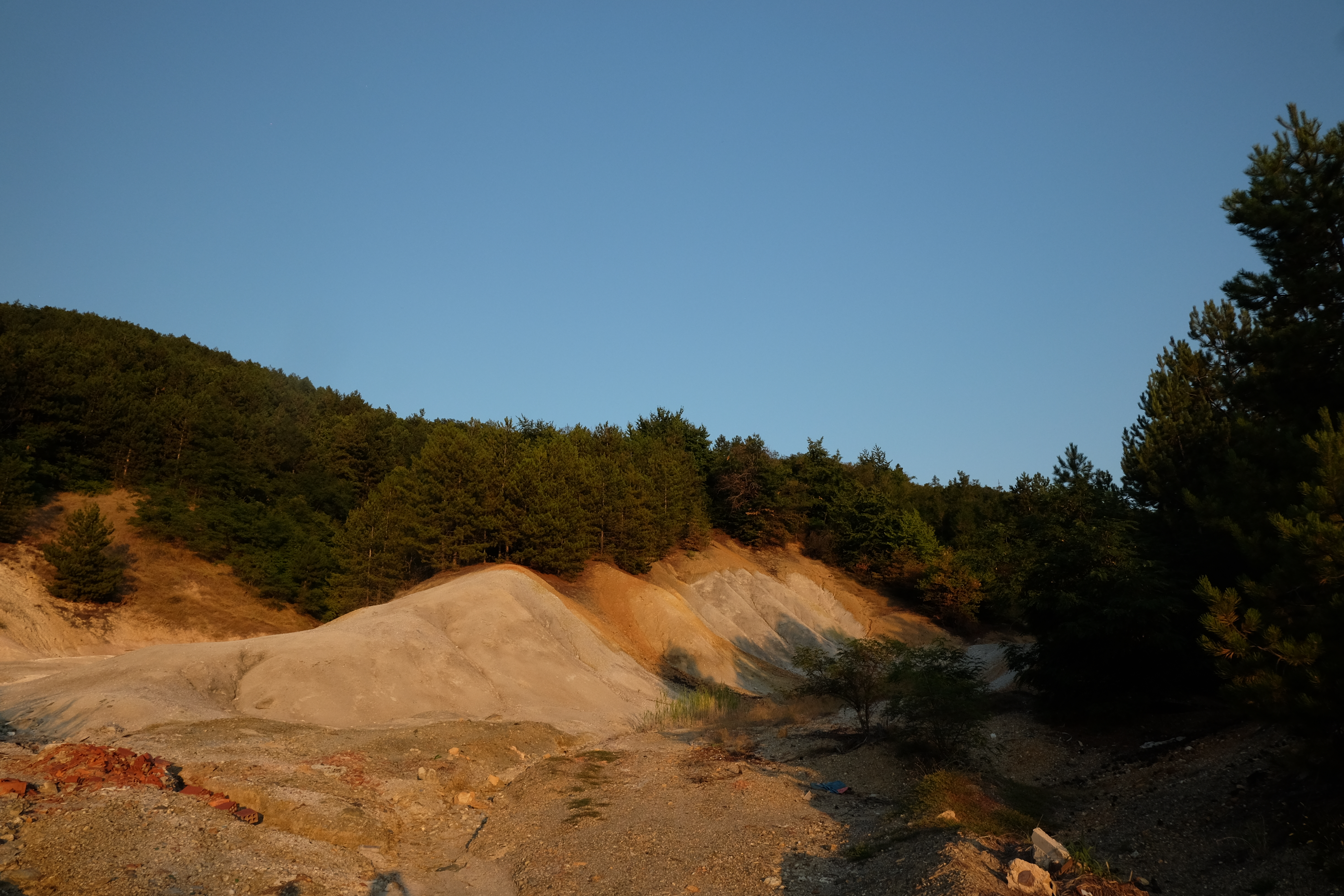
Duvalo.

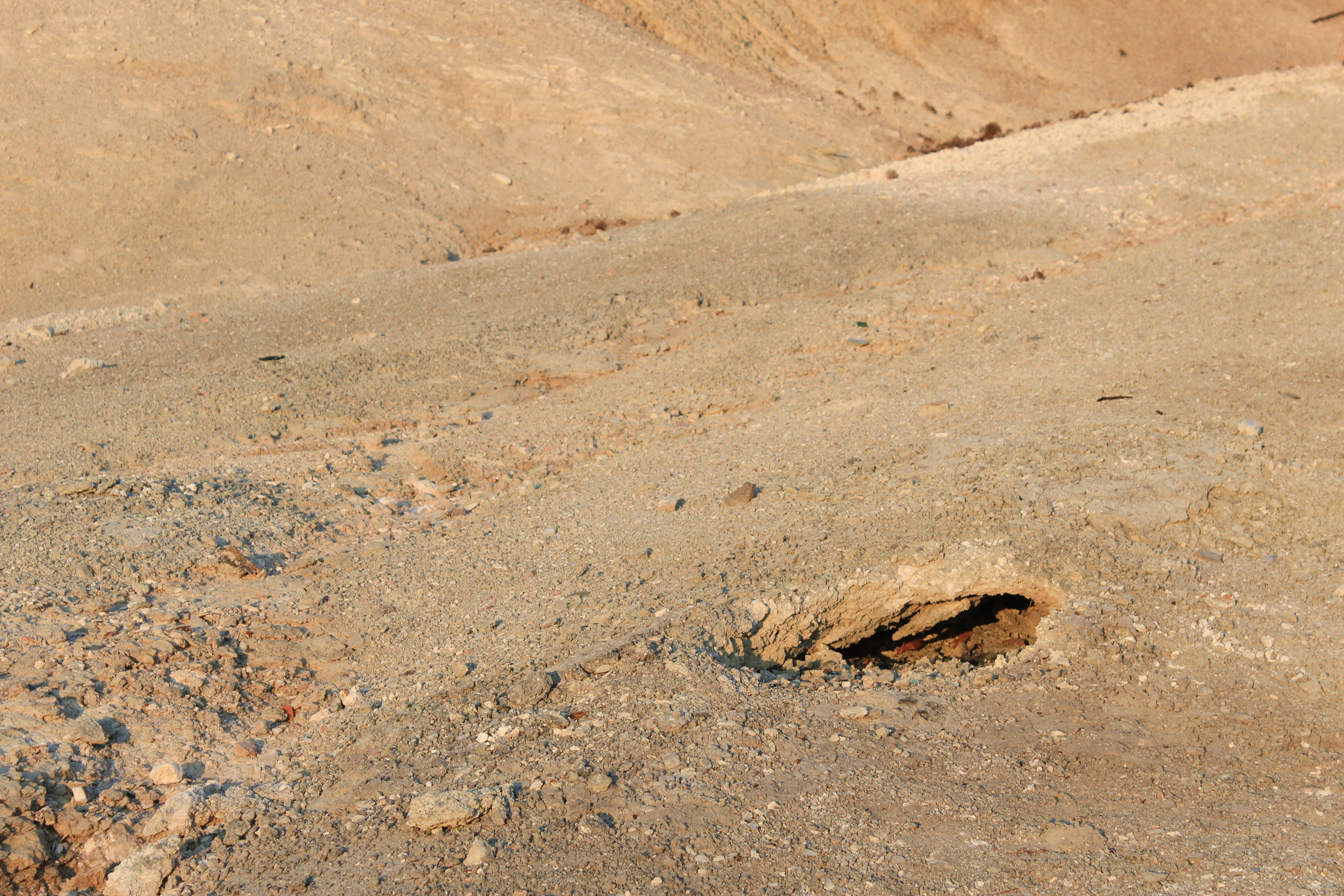
Duvalo.

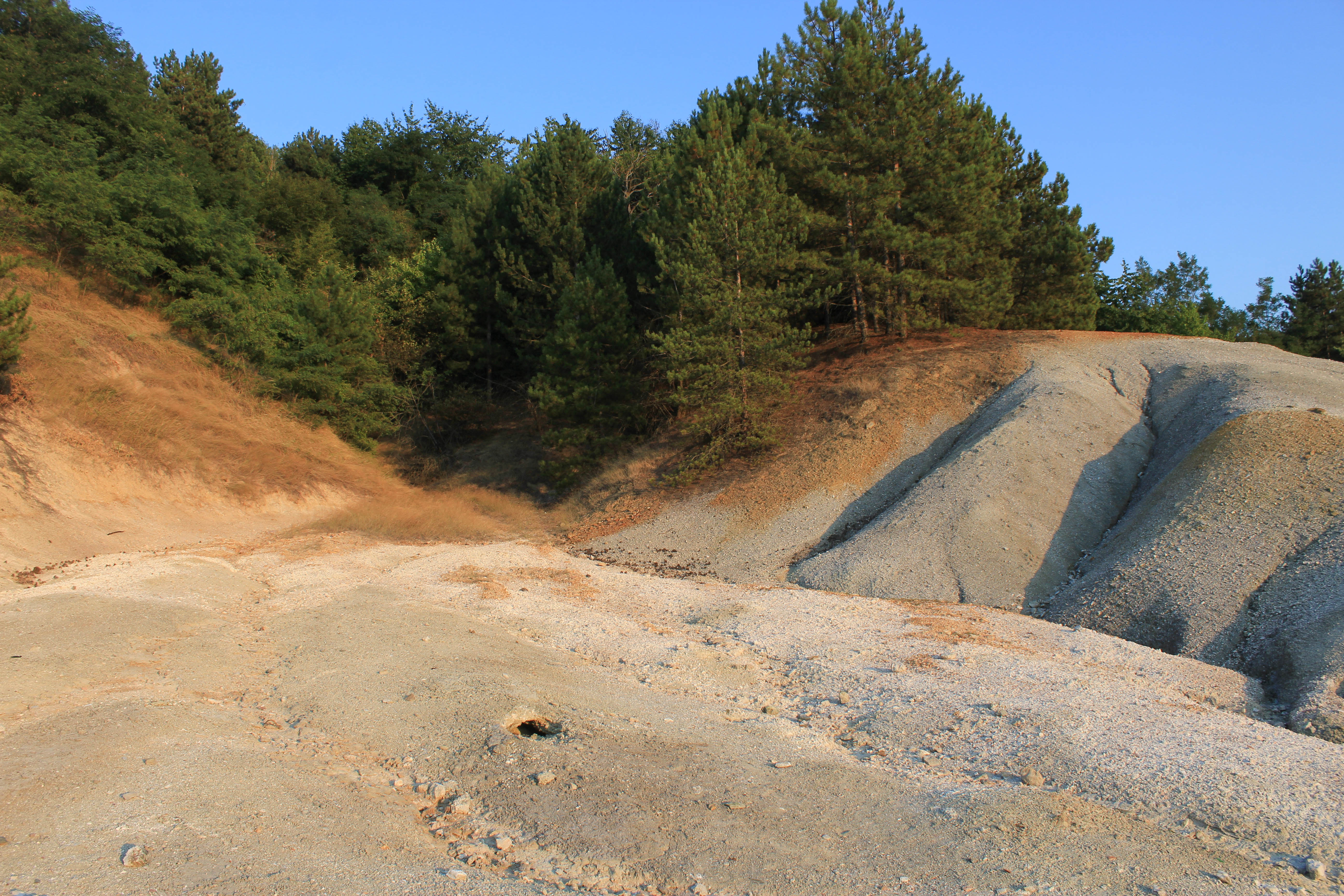
Duvalo.

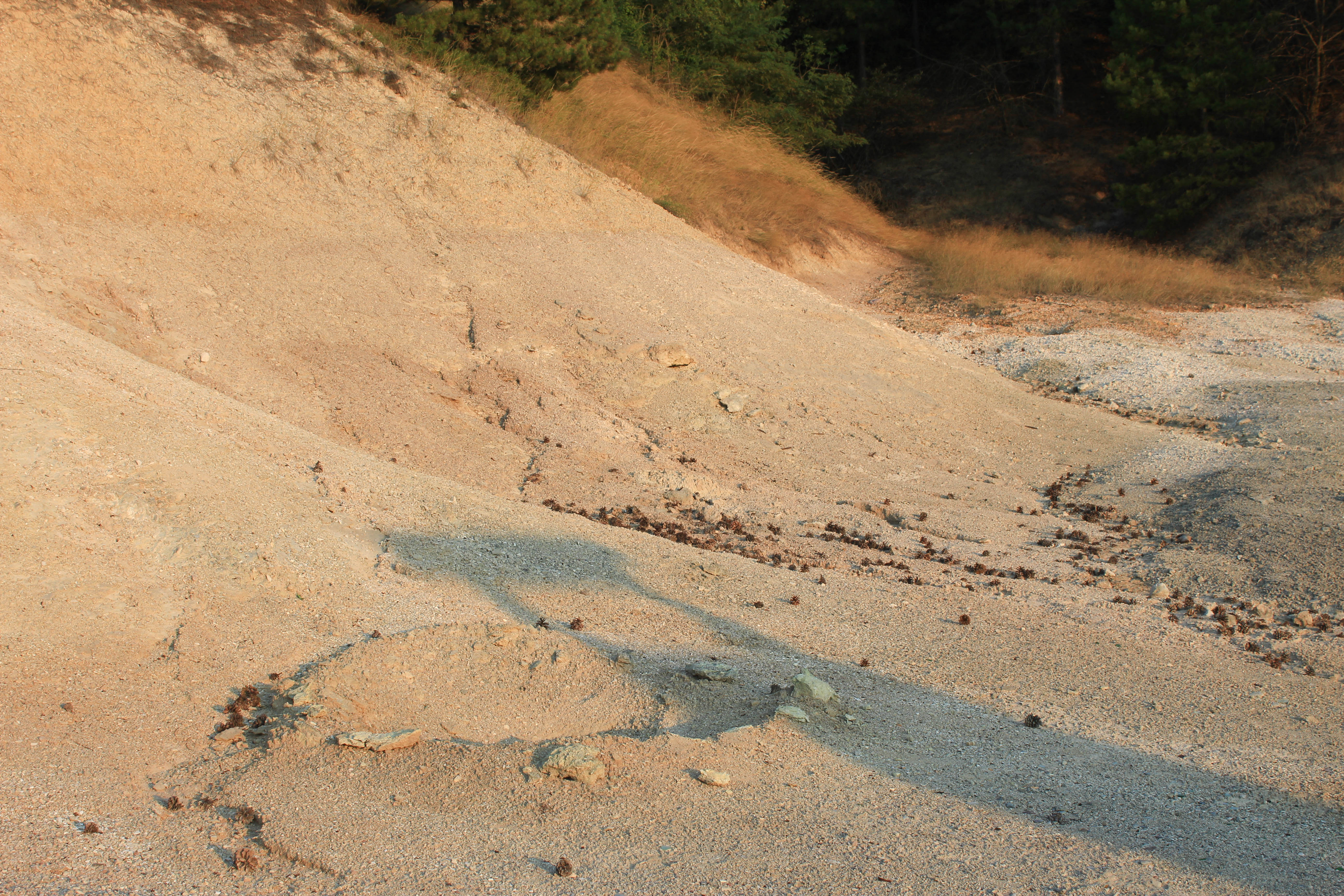
Duvalo.

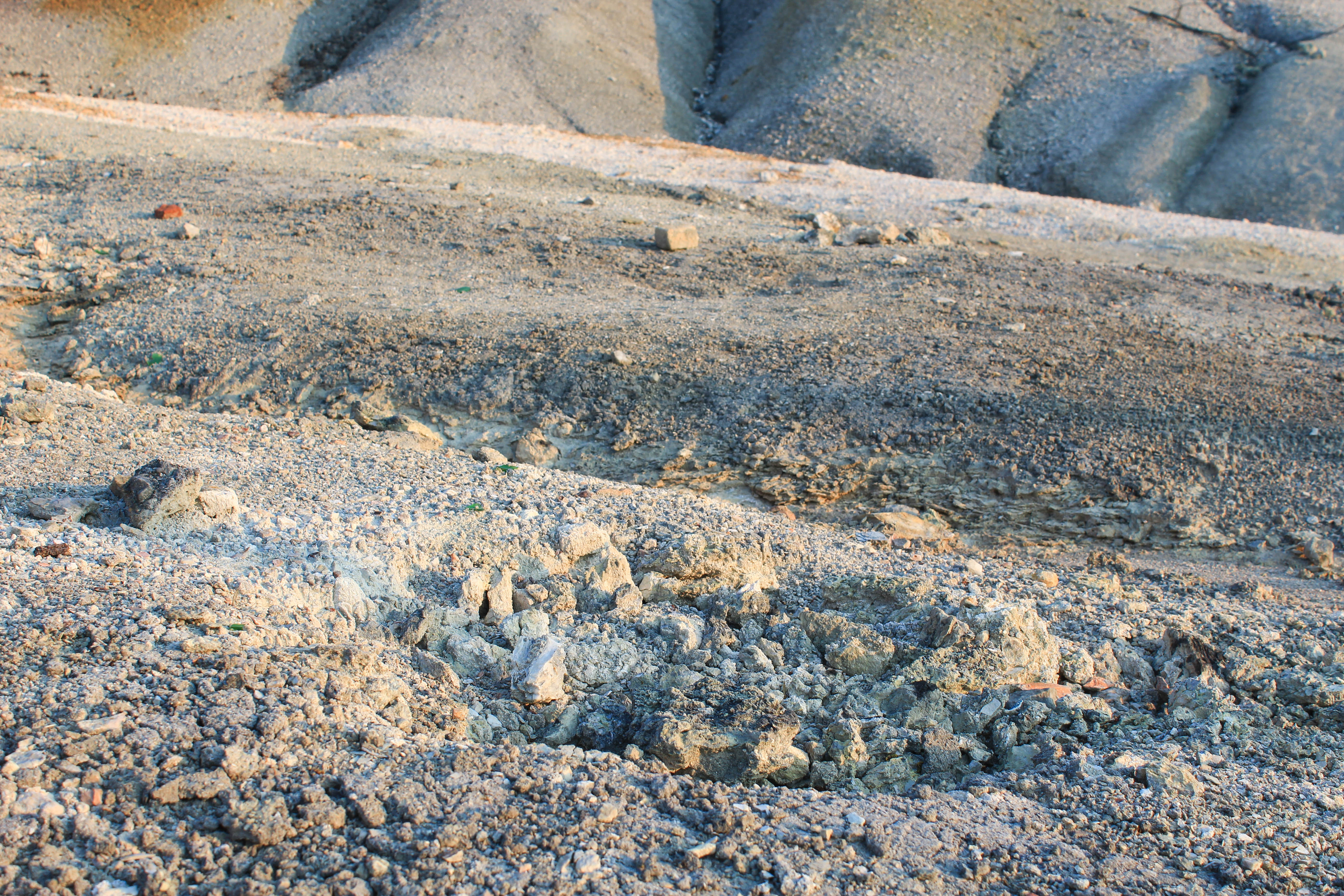
Duvalo.

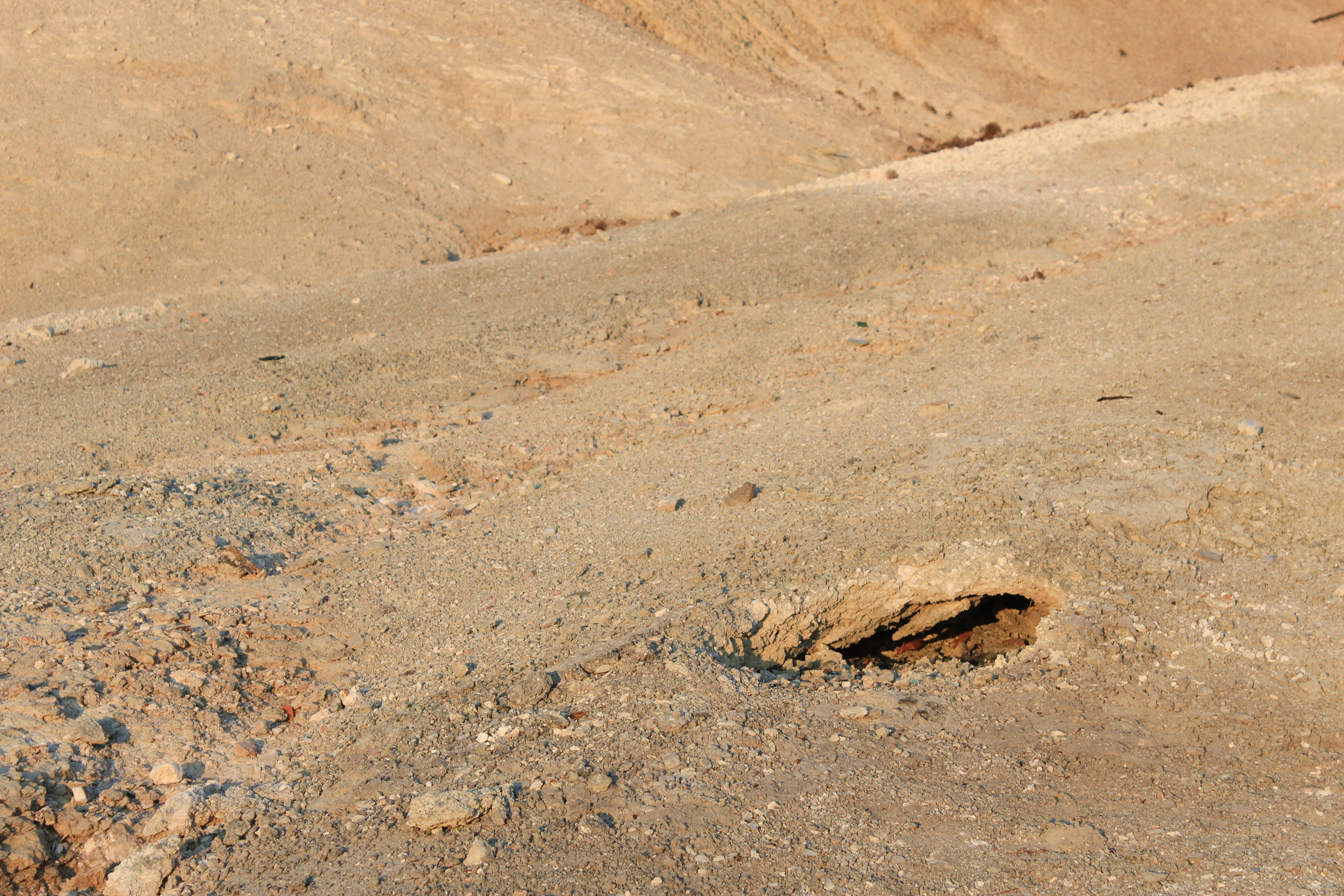
Duvalo.

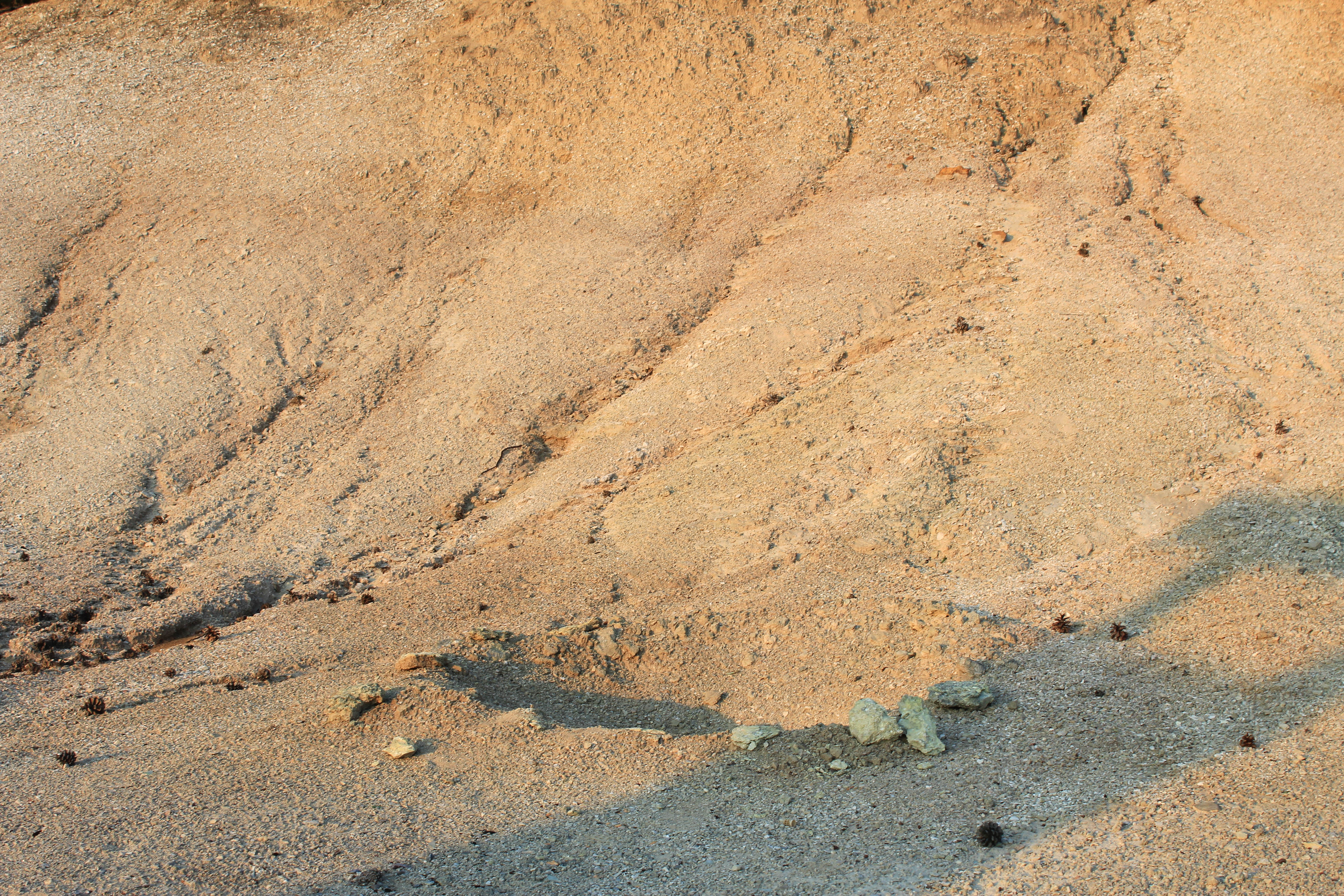
Duvalo.

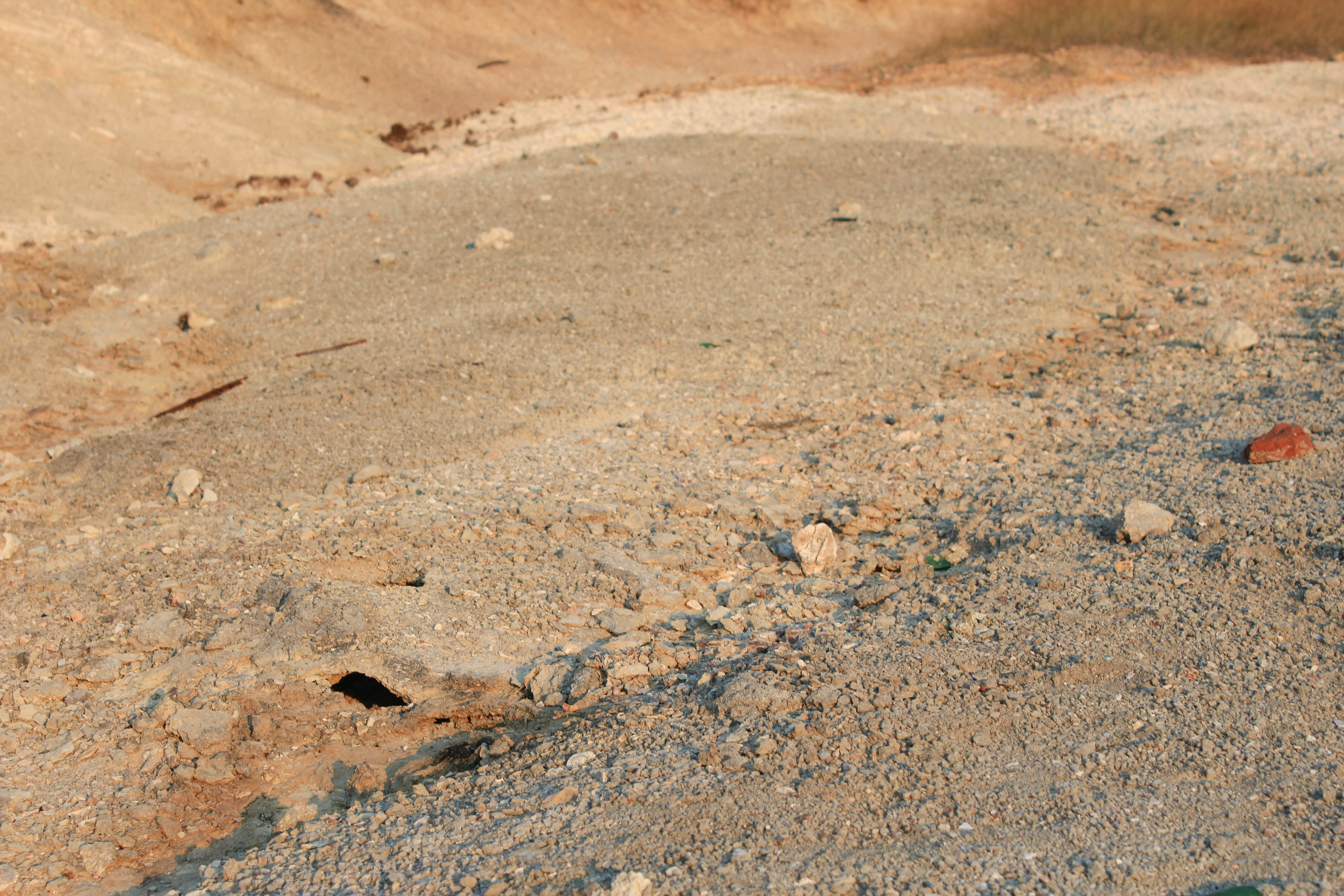
Duvalo.

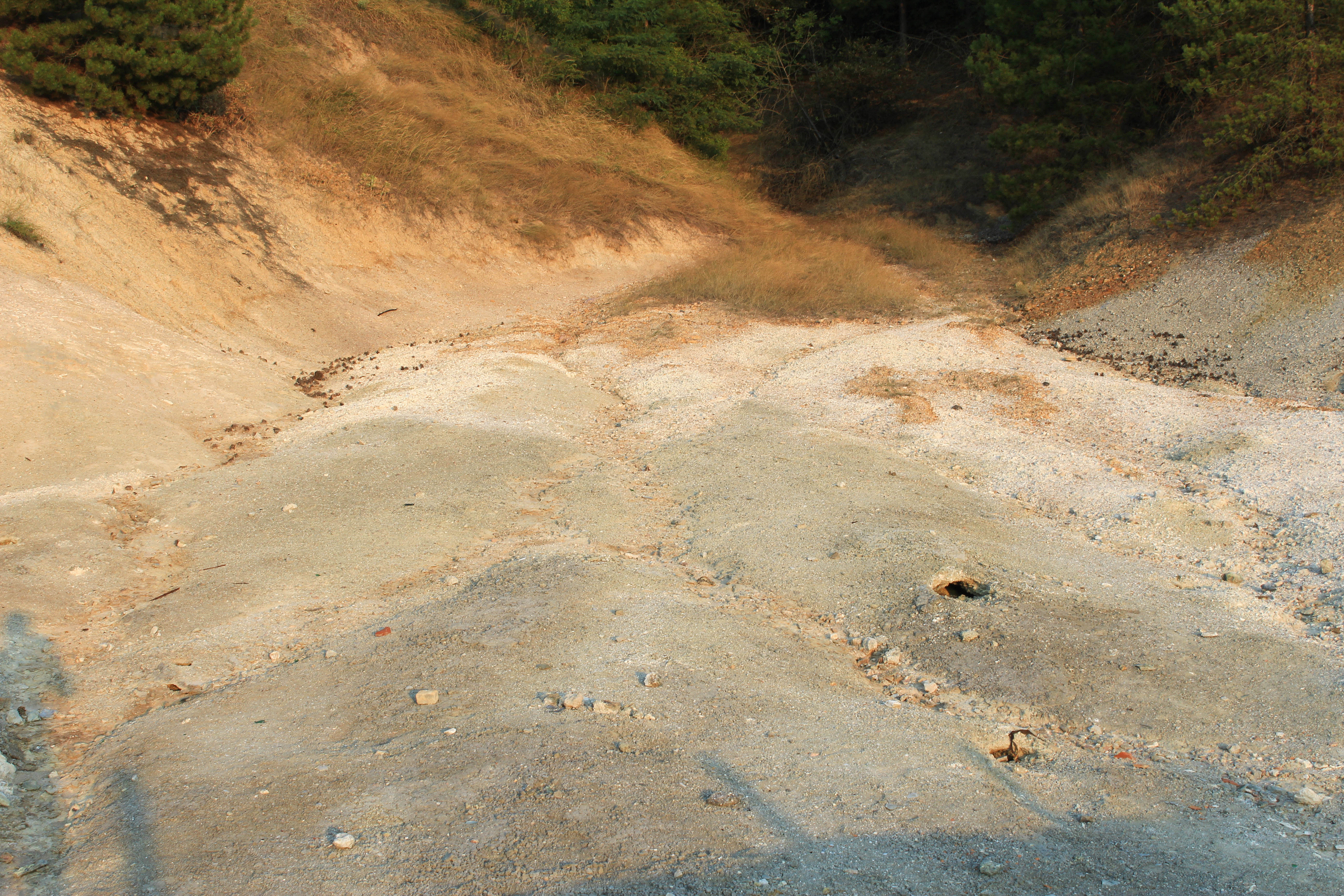
Duvalo.

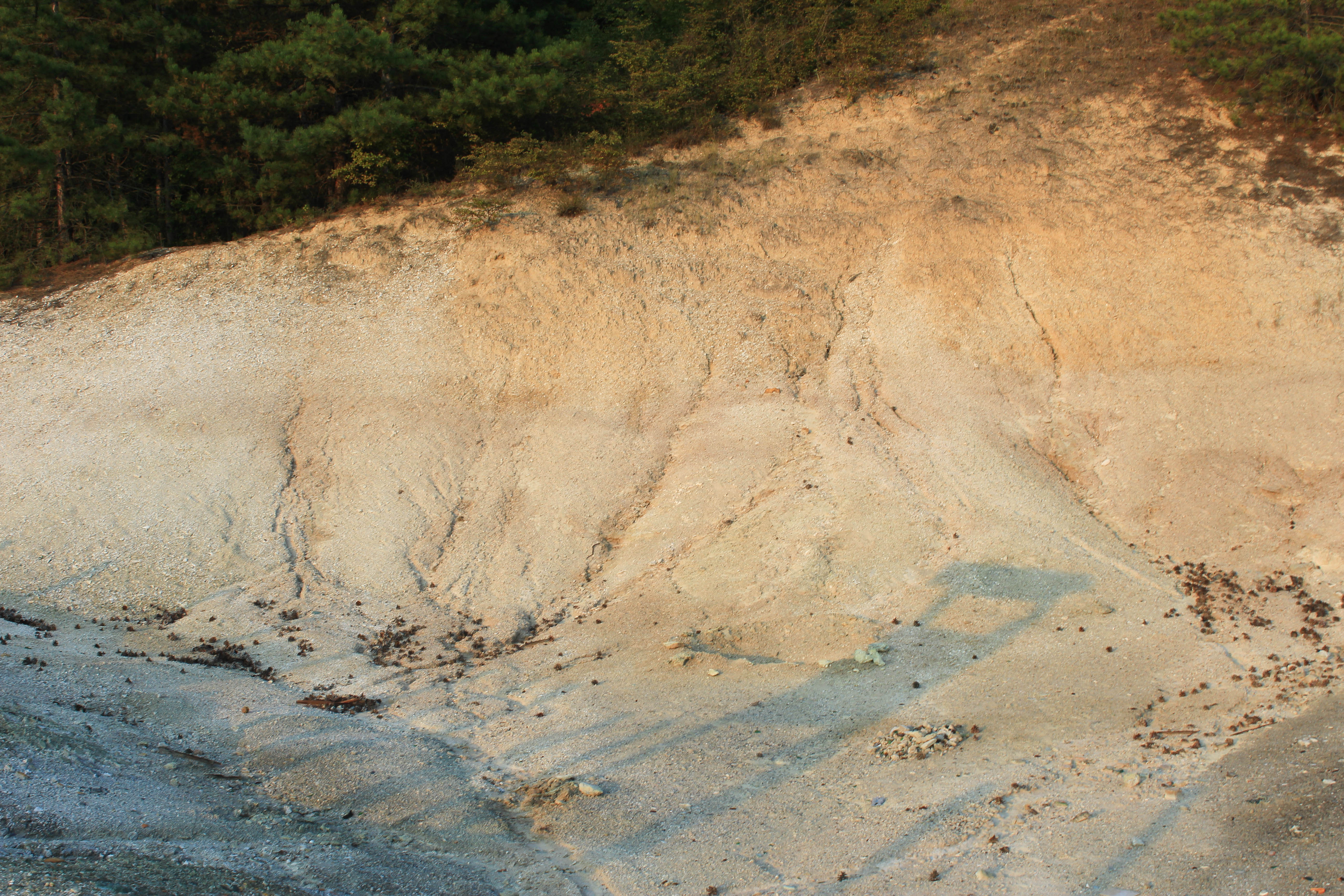
Duvalo.

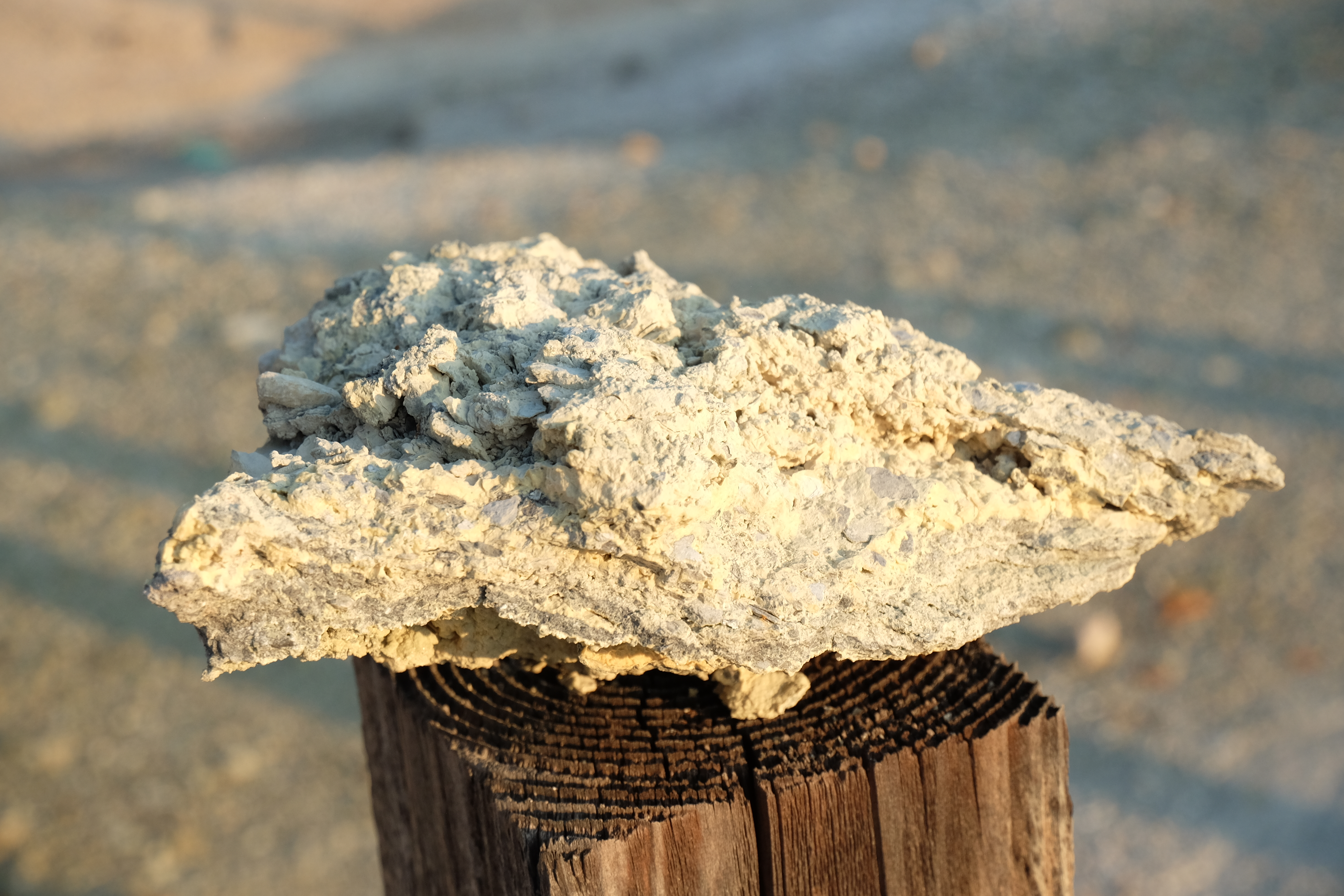
Duvalo.

== See also ==
- Lists of volcanoes
