= List of volcanoes in Equatorial Guinea =

This is a list of active and extinct volcanoes in Equatorial Guinea.

| Name | Elevation | | Location | Last eruption |
| Name | meters | feet | Coordinates | Last eruption |
|---|---|---|---|---|
| San Carlos | 2260 | 7415 | 3.35°N 8.52°E | Holocene |
| San Joaquin | 2009 | 6590 | 3.35°N 8.63°E | Holocene |
| Pico Basile | 3007 | 9865 | 3.58°N 8.75°E | 1923 |
| Mount Fijelvingue | 1500 | 4921 | | |
