= List of volcanoes in Mongolia =

This is a list of active and extinct volcanoes in Mongolia.

Name	Elevation		Location	Last eruption
Name	meters	feet	Coordinates	Last eruption
Büs-Ovoo	1162	3812	47.12°N 109.08°E	Holocene
Dariganga Volcanic Field	1778	5833	45.33°N 114.00°E	Holocene
Uran Togoo	1886	6188	48.67°N 102.75°E	Holocene
Middle Gobi	1120	3674	45.28°N 106.70°E	Holocene
Khorgo	2400	7874	48.17°N 99.70°E	2980 BC
Dari Ovoo	1354	4442	45.31°N 113.83°E	
