= List of volcanoes in Syria =

This is a list of active and extinct volcanoes in Syria.

Name	Elevation		Location	Last eruption
Name	meters	feet	Coordinates	Last eruption
Al-Safa	979	3212	33.03°N 37.2°E	1850 AD ± 10 yrs.
Golan Heights	1197	3927	33°N 36°E	Holocene
Jabal al-Druze	1803	5915	32.7°N 36.7°E	Holocene
Sharat Kovakab	534	1752	36.54°N 40.86°E	Holocene
Jabal al-Druze	945	3100	33°N 36.5°E	2670 BC ± 200 years
1222 Syrian volcanic eruption	N/A	N/A	36.7°N 37.1°E	1222 AD
Unnamed	1050	3440	33°N 36.63°E	

== Sources ==
- Siebert L, Simkin T (2002–present). Volcanoes of the World: an Illustrated Catalog of Holocene Volcanoes and their Eruptions. Smithsonian Institution, Global Volcanism Program Digital Information Series, GVP-3 (http://www.volcano.si.edu).
