= List of volcanoes in Afghanistan =

This is a list of volcanoes in Afghanistan.

Name	Elevation		Location	Last known eruption
Name	meters	feet	Coordinates	Last known eruption
Dacht-i-Navar Group	3,800	12,464	33.95°N 67.92°E	Pleistocene
Loman Volcano Group	4,559	14,954	33.33°N 67.85°E	Pleistocene
Vakak Group	3,190	10,463	34.25°N 67.97°E	Pleistocene
Zardolou Group	3,000	9,840	33.25°N 67.92°E	Pleistocene
