= Mount Muhabura =

Mountain on the Rwanda–Uganda border

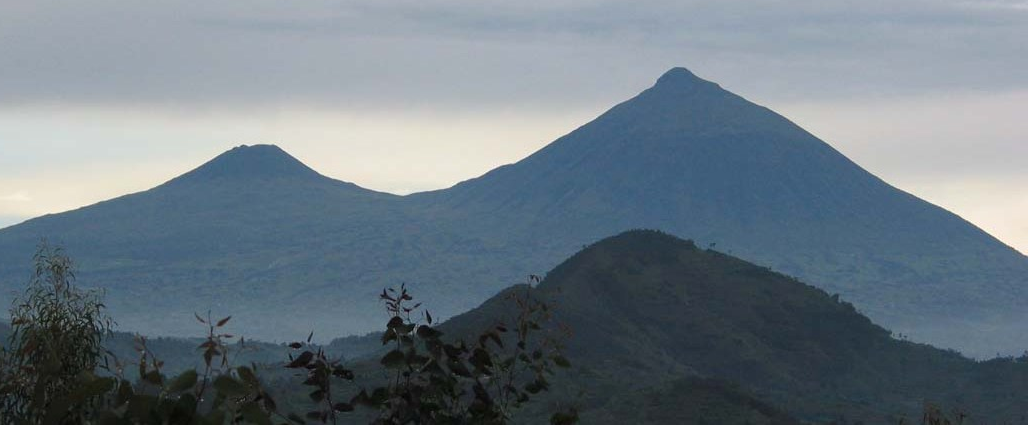
- Mts. Gahinga (left) and Muhabura (right)

Highest point
- Elevation: 4,127 m (13,540 ft)
- Prominence: 1,534 m (5,033 ft)
- Listing: Ultra; Ribu
- Coordinates: 01°23′00″S 29°40′00″E

Naming
- English translation: The Guide
- Language of name: Kinyarwanda

Geography
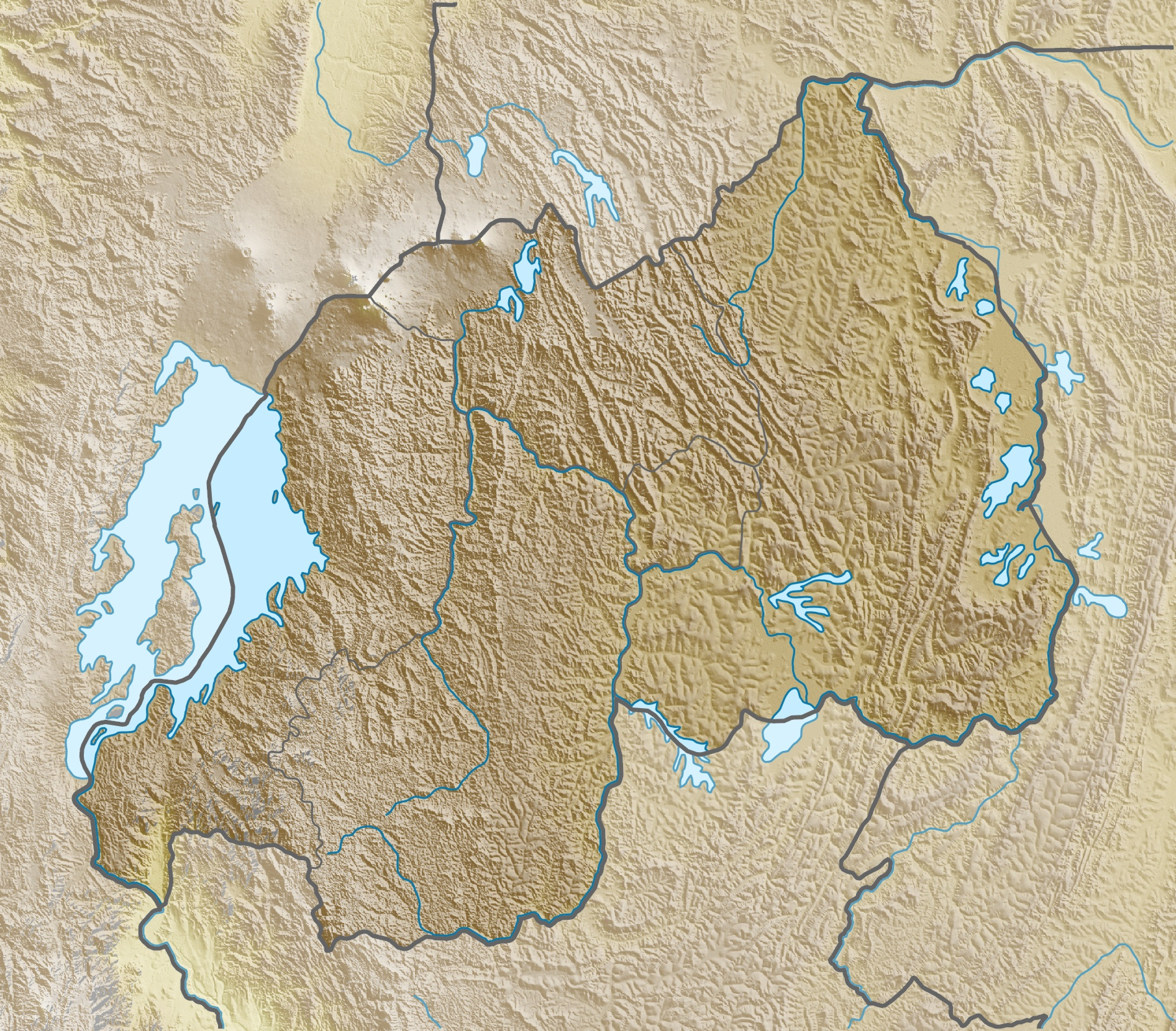
- Location within Rwanda Location within Uganda
- Location: Rwanda–Uganda
- Parent range: Virunga Mountains

Geology
- Formed by: Volcanism along the Albertine Rift
- Mountain type: Stratovolcano
- Last eruption: Unknown (Holocene?)

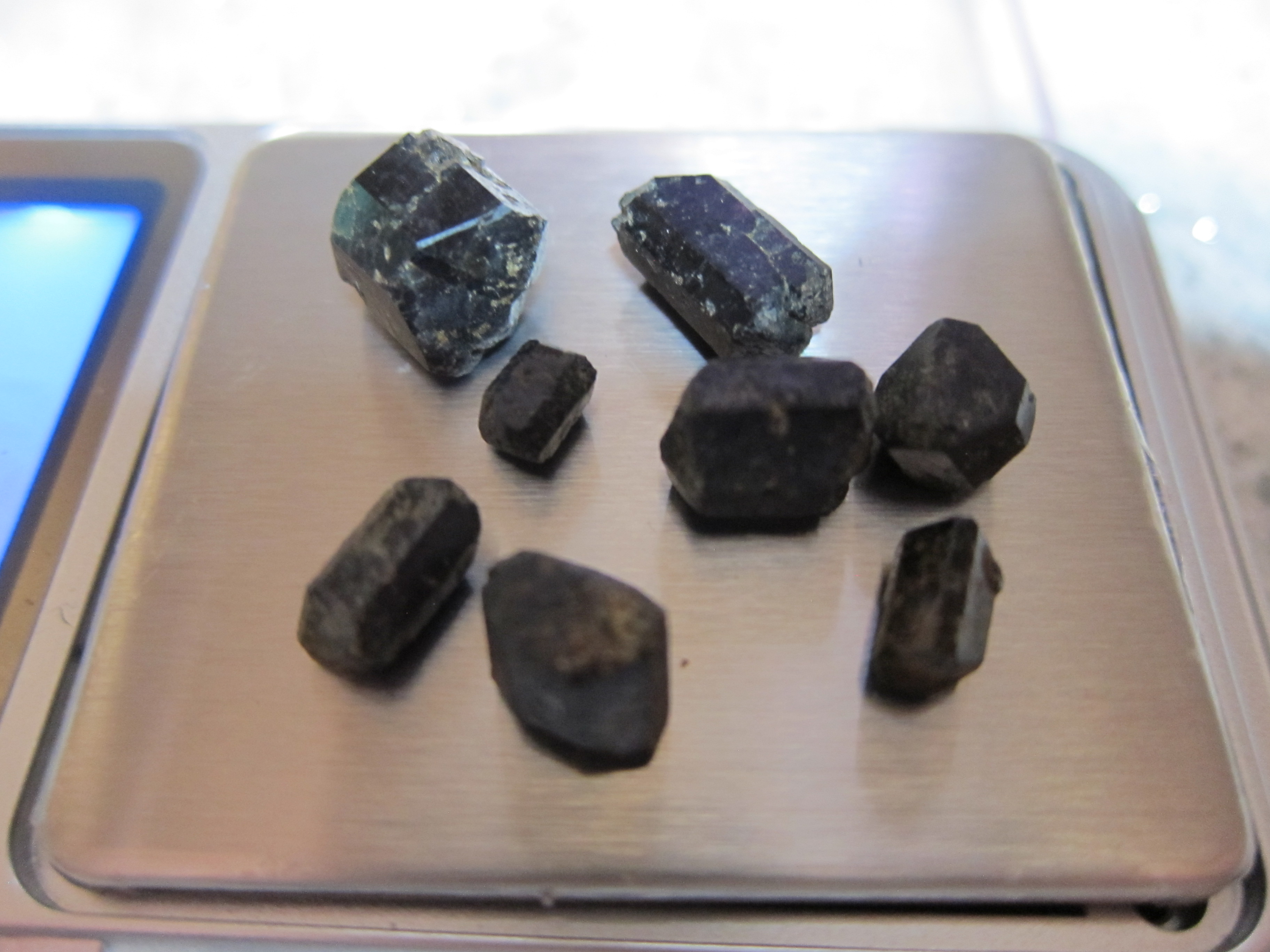
Tillamook Augite specimens

Mount Muhabura, also known as Mount Muhavura, is an inactive volcano in the Virunga Mountains on the Rwanda-Uganda border. At 4,127 metres (13,540 ft), Muhabura is the third highest of the eight major mountains of the mountain range, which is part of the Albertine Rift, the western branch of the East African Rift. Its summit contains a small crater lake. The limited evidence for this volcano suggests that it last erupted some time in the Holocene, but the exact date is not known. The Smithsonian Institution states that a small parasitic crater near Muhabura had been active "recently" without mentioning a date.

The name Muhabura means "The Guide" in the local language, Kinyarwanda.

== Geography ==
Muhabura is the third highest of the eight volcanoes in the Virunga Mountains chain at an altitude of 4,127 metres (13,540 ft) with a prominence of 1,530 metres. It can be seen from many parts of Uganda and Rwanda because of its height and characteristic slope.

It is flanked by the smaller Mount Gahinga to the west, separated by a swamp from the Kabiranyuma River. Muhabura´s Northern side lies in the Mgahinga Gorilla National Park, in Uganda and the Southern side in Volcanoes National Park, Rwanda.

Hiking the peak is possible from Rwanda's Volcanoes National Park headquarters in Kinigi, which is two hours drive from Kigali or from Musanze.

== Gallery ==
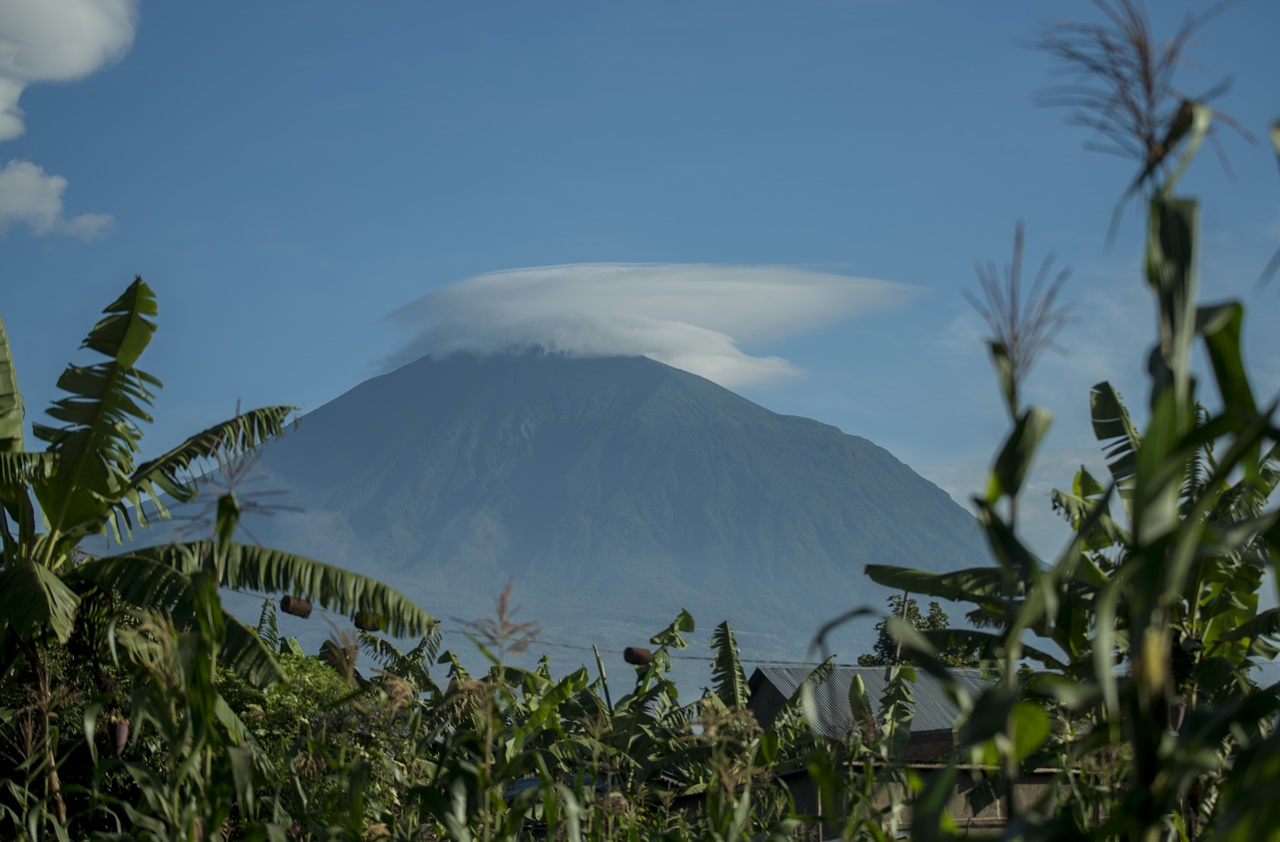
View of Muhabura Volcano in Kinigi sector, Musanze district, Rwanda afar from Volcanoes Park

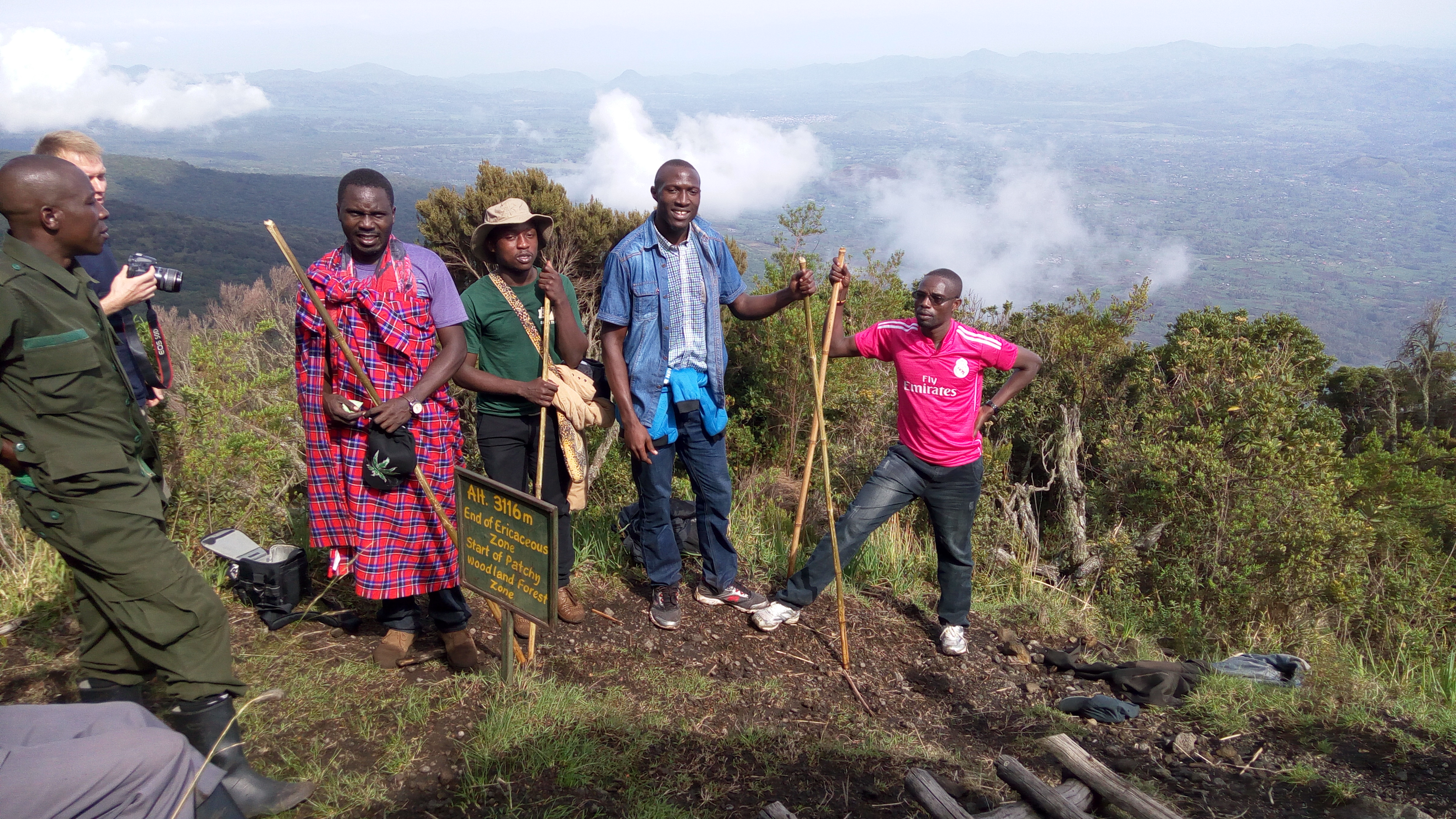
Hiking on mount Muhabura

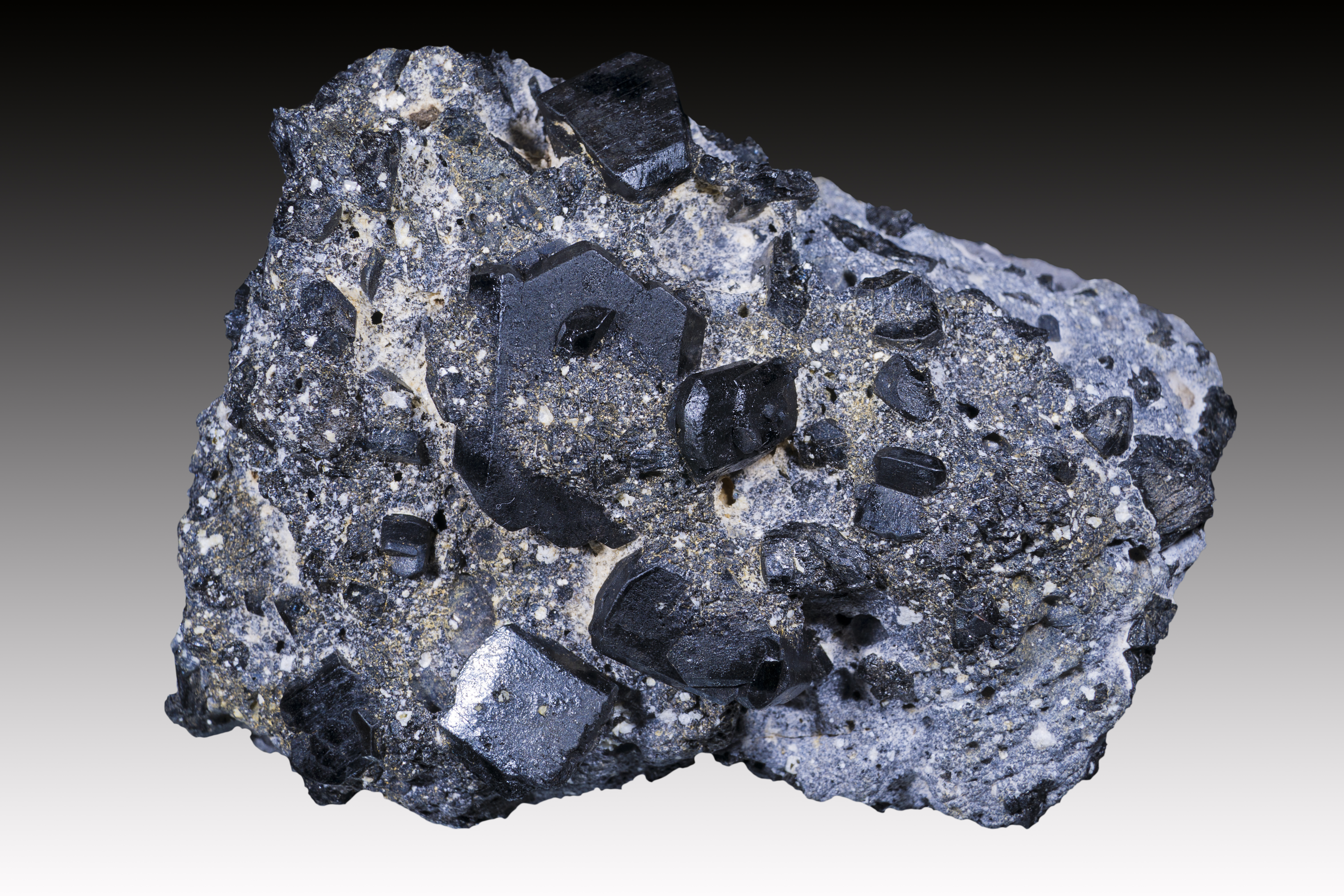
Volcanic rock from Muhabura containing crystals of augite

== See also ==
- List of volcanoes in Rwanda
- List of volcanoes in Uganda
