= List of volcanoes in the Comoros =

This is a list of active and extinct volcanoes in the Comoros.

| Name | Elevation | | Location | Last eruption |
| Name | meters | feet | Coordinates | Last eruption |
|---|---|---|---|---|
| La Grille | 1087 | 3566 | 11.47°S 43.33°E | Holocene |
| Mount Karthala | 2361 | 7746 | 11.75°S 43.38°E | 2007 |

== See also ==
- Lists of volcanoes
- Siebert L, Simkin T (2002–present). Volcanoes of the World: an Illustrated Catalog of Holocene Volcanoes and their Eruptions. Smithsonian Institution, Global Volcanism Program Digital Information Series, GVP-3 (http://www.volcano.si.edu).
