= List of volcanoes in Uganda =

A list of all volcanoes in Uganda

This is a list of active and extinct volcanoes in Uganda.

| Name | Elevation | | Location | Last eruption |
| Name | meters | feet | Coordinates | Last eruption |
|---|---|---|---|---|
| Bufumbira | 2440 | 8005 | 1.23°S 29.72°E | Holocene |
| Bunyaruguru Field | 1554 | 5098 | 0.20°S 30.08°E | Holocene |
| Mount Elgon | 4321 | 14,178 | 1.13°N 34.56°E | |
| Fort Portal Field | 1524 | 5000 | 0.70°N 30.25°E | Holocene |
| Mount Katunga | 1707 | 5600 | 0.47°S 30.18°E | Holocene |
| Katwe-Kikorongo Field | 1067 | 3501 | 0.08°S 29.92°E | Holocene |
| Kyatwa Volcanic Field | 1430 | 4692 | 0.45°N 30.25°E | Holocene |
| Mount Muhavura | 4127 | 13,450 | 1.38°S 29.67°E | Holocene |
