= Nova Iguaçu Volcano =

Volcano in Rio de Janeiro, Brazil

The Nova Iguaçu Volcano ("Vulcão de Nova Iguaçu" in Portuguese) is located in the state of Rio de Janeiro, Brazil, in an area of volcanic rocks at the north-eastern border of the Mendanha massif. Klein and Vieira proposed the site to be an extinct volcano with a volcanic cone, volcanic crater, and volcanic bomb. Scientific journals have studied the volcanic geology of the area, identifying the rocks of volcanic appearance as constituted of subvolcanic intrusive rock bodies. The Nova Iguaçu volcano theory is now extinct in academic communities, but the myth continues in sightseeing promotion groups.

Recent research revealed that volcanic eruptions did occur in the Nova Iguaçu region. After the eruptions, an intense uplifting and consequent regional denudation took place. The cones, craters, lavas, pyroclastic flow deposits, and volcanic bombs have been washed away in the strong tropical erosion of this region, exposing the underlying geologic structure. The Municipal Park is underlain by the geologic bodies corresponding to the magma chamber (composed of syenite and trachyte) and subvolcanic conduit (made up of pyroclastic rocks) of a depth of 3 kilometers, such as pyroclastic dikes. That is, no extinct volcano is present at Nova Iguaçu. The outcrops are world-rare geological phenomena that expose the underground geologic structures of the volcanic area.

== Locality ==
The debated volcano is in the Municipality of Nova Iguaçu, about 35 kilometers to the west-northwest of Rio de Janeiro, Brazil. It is a horseshoe-shaped valley opening to the north at the north-east flank of the Mendanha massif, about 2 kilometers south-southeast of the Nova Iguaçu railway station. It is 800 meters long, 700 meters wide, and 180 meters deep at 22°46′1″S 43°27′59″W. This area is surrounded by peaks more than 400 meters high, such as Contenda Rock, Austral Rock, Confeito Rock, and Contento Peak, which are underlain by pyroclastic rock. This rock originated from rock fragments created by a volcanic explosion. The valley is made up of trachyte, another igneous rock with massive texture. The pyroclastic rock was the main justification of the Nova Iguaçu Volcano hypothesis.

== Proposal of the volcano hypothesis ==
The existence of a volcano at Nova Iguaçu was proposed by geologists Viktor Carvalho Klein and André Calixto Vieira in the 1980s. Klein and Vieira based their discovery on the presence of pyroclastic rocks (including volcanic bombs) and the existence of a volcanic crater. They believed the pyroclastic rock to be pyroclastic flow deposits, constituting an “extraordinary well-preserved complete volcanic edifice”. The bread-crust bomb was highlighted as further evidence. The work of Klein and Vieira led to a doctoral degree and a pamphlet-style geological field excursion guide. However, their work was not published in scientific journals, and therefore the Nova Iguaçu Volcano hypothesis did not receive the attention and scrutiny necessary to transform it into an academically accepted scientific theory.

== Later development ==
In the early-to-mid-2000s (decade), a research group composed of geologists from several Brazilian institutions conducted additional geological studies into the existence of a volcano at Nova Iguaçu. Some members of the group agreed with Vieira that a volcanic crater existed at Nova Iguaçu (Loc. 1). However, other members disagreed because the supposed crater is underlain by massive trachyte, not volcanic breccia.

== Public awareness ==
In 2004, the Rio de Janeiro State Department of Mineral Resources (DRM-RJ) started a public information campaign about the geology of Nova Iguaçu with special attention given to the Municipal Park and the theories concerning the extinct volcano. As a part of the project, panel-plates with information about the hypothesis of the Nova Iguaçu Volcano were placed in strategic locations around the area and included on the DRM-RJ homepage.

Brazilian media began publicizing the hypothesis of a volcano at Nova Iguaçu based on interviews with a geologist who stated it was the only area in Brazil with clear morphology of a volcanic crater and a volcanic cone. In 2004, the Nova Iguaçu Topshopping held the Volcano Exposition, and the Rio de Janeiro State Financial Tribunary declared the volcanic crater to be a natural sightseeing attraction point of Nova Iguaçu and Mesquita. The Nova Iguaçu Municipal Government and the Mesquita Municipal Government helped to distribute the information. These non-academic sources had a special interest in the volcanic crater, commenting that an extremely long eruption lasting from 72 million years ago until 40 million years ago was incompatible with the scientific study of Earth’s volcanoes.

In early 2005, numerous media, governmental, and scientific sources reported that mining activity of the Vigné Quarry (Loc. 7) was destroying Brazil's only intact volcano. A judicial process was sent to the Public Ministry of the State of Rio de Janeiro, requiring the immediate interdiction of the quarry. The last report confirmed a volcanic edifice but denied the volcanic crater, recommending reopening mining on a reduced scale.

The Nova Iguaçu Volcano theory expanded to become a social phenomenon. Sightseeing, commercial, artistic, administrative, and educational activities took place, as if the hypothesis was an established scientific theory. The environmental education was a notable regional highlight. The city of Nova Iguaçu adopted traffic signs with volcanic images. A movement began to register the Municipal Park to the UNESCO as “Geopark of the Nova Iguaçu Volcano”. Some scientific events and the homepage of the DRM-RJ referred to the Municipal Park as the Geopark. Certain newspapers printed, based on the interviews of another geologist, that the UERJ and Petrobrás (Brazilian National Petroleum Company) were investing one million dollars over two years in researching the oilfield by means of the Nova Iguaçu Volcano.

== Scientific doubts ==
The first scientific article concerning Nova Iguaçu geology was published in 2006. In the article, and at several scientific events, Akihisa Motoki presented a case against the existence of a volcano at Nova Iguaçu, showing that the geology and morphology of Nova Iguaçu are incompatible with the volcanic model. No article defending the volcano hypothesis has been published in a qualified scientific journal.

== Geological discussion ==
=== Volcanic crater ===
A volcanic crater is a circular negative morphology formed after an explosive eruption. The eruption forms breccia with large clasts, called explosion breccia. The DRM-RJ states the crater is present in a horseshoe-shaped valley situated about 2 kilometers to the south of the urban zone. Vieira & Klein presented the north-south geologic cross-section of the supposed crater, showing a prominent volcanic cone. However, the topographic map of this area does not exhibit morphologic characteristics. The inner walls of the valley are not sub-vertical, but have a shallow angle of 15 to 20°, comparable to a slope formed by erosion. Klein & Vieira inferred that the supposed crater area might be underlain by volcanic agglomerate, that is, volcanic breccia with large clasts. The rock is trachyte and thus disproves the volcanic crater theory.

=== Volcanic cone ===
The volcanic cone corresponds to the cone-formed positive morphology originated from the accumulation of solid eruptive materials. Vieira & Klein presented an illustration of the Nova Iguaçu volcanic cone, of 1.7 kilometers in diameter, 250 meters in relative height, and 27° in flank angle. If so, the cone must appear prominently on the north-eastern flank of the Mendanha massif, and be easily recognized from Nova Iguaçu and neighbouring cities; however, such a cone is not seen or confirmed by topographic map and satellite images.

=== Volcanic bomb ===
A volcanic bomb is one type of essential fragment originating from a magma drop, launched from the crater in viscous semi-solid state. Indications of vesiculation, volume expansion, and plastic deformation are observed. In case of high-viscosity magma, such as andesite and dacite, the consolidated clast surface is cracked by the volume expansion originated from vesiculation. Such a bomb is called bread-crust bomb. Silveira et al. (2005) and Valente et al. (2005) proved that more than 50% of the clast present in the volcanic agglomerate of the Contenda Rock are volcanic bombs. Klein & Vieira (1980b) and Klein et al. (2001) commented on the presence of bread-crust bomb. However, Motoki et al. (2007b) revealed that these clasts are not porous, but composed of massive trachyte. In addition, no signs of plastic deformation are observed. The altered clast surface with porous appearance is attributed to weathering of fabrics, namely pseudovesicular structure. Therefore, it is concluded that no volcanic bomb is present at Nova Iguaçu.

=== Lava flow ===
Geraldes & Netto (2004a; b), Silveira et al. (2005) and Valente et al. (2005) concluded that the trachyte of this area was made up of lava flows which covered the erosion surface of the syenitic rock. If so, the trachyte must be younger than the syenite. However, field observation of the contact outcrops demonstrated that the trachyte intrudes into the metamorphic syenite, forming an intrusive body older than the syenite (Motoki et al., 2007a). Geraldes & Netto (2004a; b), Silveira et al. (2005) and Valente et al. (2005) considered that the trachyte is distributed only along the valley of the crater in a strip 2 kilometers long and less than 100 meters thick. This body has a horizontal extension larger than 15 kilometers and stretches from the base to the top of the Mendanha massif, with more than an 800-meter drop in elevation (Motoki et al., 2007a). Valente et al. (2005) show isolated occurrences of hexagonal fractures as evidence of trachyte lava flow. The trachyte does not have the characteristics of lava flow and lava dome (Motoki et al., 2007a). The hexagonal fractures were identified to be horizontal columnar joints of trachyte dike. These geological observations indicate that the trachyte is an intrusive body, being the oldest body of the felsic alkaline magmatism of this area, and is clearly different from the lava flows overlying the eroded surface of the syenite.

=== Pyroclastic flow ===
Klein & Vieira (1980a; b), Klein et al. (1984), Geraldes & Netto (2004a), Silveira et al. (2005), Valente et al. (2005), etc., concluded the pyroclastic rocks and their neighbours present at the Contenda Rock are pyroclastic flows, using the layered structure as proof. Motoki et al. (2007c) concluded the development degree and horizontal continuity of the pyroclastic textures are too poor for a pyroclastic flow deposit. The pyroclastic rocks along the Eugênia River are exposed, forming pyroclastic dykes, presenting underground subvolcanic fissures. If the pyroclastic rocks originated from pyroclastic flows, the deposits should have been widely present in the Fluminense lowland, such as Mesquita, Nilopolis, Nova Iguaçu, and Duque de Caxias. Welded pyroclastic rocks resist weathering and are therefore easily identified. Such volcanic deposits are not found in the Fluminense lowland. This confirms that these pyroclastic rocks were not created in pyroclastic flows.

== Present conclusion of the scientific works ==
In recent years, the hypothesis of the Nova Iguaçu volcano has been an ardent discussion in scientific events and geological journals, being a controversial theme of the local geology. Research has clarified the inexistence of crater, cone, bomb, lava, and pyroclastic flow, and the scientific problems of the previous works were pointed out one by one. In this situation, the research groups favorable to the volcano hypothesis maintain their silence in academic communities. In this way, the geological studies of Nova Iguaçu are arriving at a new paradigm, that is, the inexistence of Nova Iguaçu Volcano.
