= 1222 Syrian volcanic eruption =

Coordinates: 36.67°N 37°E

Unnamed

Highest point
- Elevation: 600 metres (1,970 ft) (approx)

Geography
- Location: Syria

Geology
- Mountain type: Volcanic field
- Last eruption: 1222

In 1222, a volcanic eruption took place in a volcanic field in northern Syria near Killis, Turkey. The volcano probably formed because of a regional graben. The Volcano is Andesitic-Basaltic in composition.

== Eruptions ==
=== 1222 eruption ===
The eruption was a VEI 0 that produced lava flows sometime in 1222 AD.

== Other fields ==
Fields that are of Miocene-Quaternary in age are located in nearby Turkey.

== Source ==
- Siebert, Lee; Simkin, Tom; Kimberly, Paul (2011). Volcanoes of the World (3rd ed.). University of California Press. ISBN 9780520947931.
