= List of volcanoes in Cape Verde =

This is a list of active and extinct volcanoes in Cape Verde.

Name	Elevation		Location	Last eruption
Name	meters	feet	Coordinates	Last eruption
Brava	900	2953	14.85°N 24.72°W	Holocene
Fogo	2829	9281	14.95°N 24.35°W	2014
São Vicente	725	2379	16.85°N 24.97°W	Holocene
