= Loman Volcano Group =

Field of lava domes in Afghanistan

Highest point
- Elevation: 4,559 m (14,957 ft)

Geography
- Location: Afghanistan

Geology
- Rock age: Pliocene
- Mountain type: Volcanic field
- Last eruption: Pleistocene

The Loman Volcano group is a field of lava domes in Afghanistan. The group is composed of Quaternary lava domes. The last known eruption occurred in the Pleistocene epoch.
