= List of volcanoes in Poland =

This is a list of extinct volcanoes in Poland.

| Name | Elevation | | Location | Last eruption | Reference |
| Name | meters | feet | Coordinates | Last eruption | Reference |
|---|---|---|---|---|---|
| Ostrzyca | 501 | 1644 | 51°03′20″N 15°45′50″E | 3 to 4 million years | |
| Grodczyn | 803 | 2635 | 50°24′50″N 16°20′00″E | - | |
| Wilcza Góra | 373 | 1224 | 51°06′03″N 15°55′02″E | Neogene | |
| Zamkowa Góra (Waldenburg Mountains) | 618 | 2027 | 50°44′06″N 16°17′34″E | Permian | |
| Sośnica (Wzgórza Lipowe) | 302 | 990 | 50°41′00″N 16°57′43″E | Miocene | |
| Rataj (Pogórze Kaczawskie) | 350 | 1148 | 51°01′17″N 16°07′30″E | Miocene | |

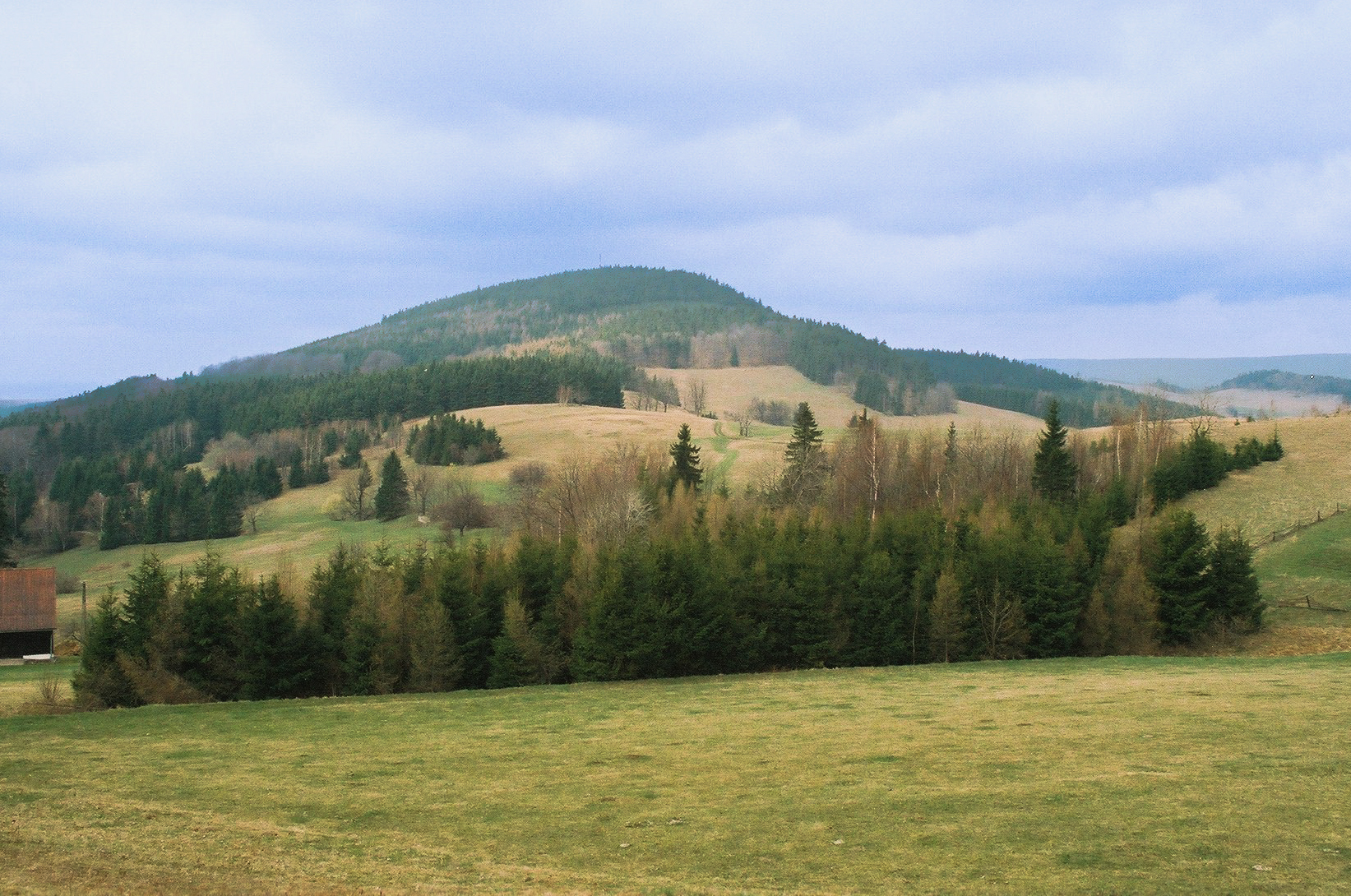
Grodczyn
