= Bus-Obo =

Mongolian landform

Coordinates: 47.12°N 109.08°E

Bus-Obo (Büs-Ovoo) is a 1,162 metres (3,812 ft) high cinder cone in Mongolia. The 90 metres (300 ft) high cone is formed by basaltic rocks. It may be of Pleistocene or Holocene age.

It is located within a Caledonian orogenic belt in Mongolia, in the Middle Gobi area. A low velocity zone in the mantle is associated with Bus-Obo. Other Pliocene to Pleistocene age lava flows and craters are found within the adjacent Orchon valley, their relationship to this cone is unknown.

Sources indicate that a Joint Mongolian-Soviet expedition may have occurred. Operated by Dr. V. V. Kepezhinskas, P. K. Kepezhinskas, A. Ya. Saltykovsky, and Yu. S. Genshaft, in 1979. The mission was to explore Cenozoic alkaline basaltoids in Mongolia Middle Gobi area.
