= List of volcanoes in Wallis Islands =

This is a list of active and extinct volcanoes.

Name	Elevation		Location	Last eruption
Name	meters	feet	Coordinates	Last eruption
Alofi	-	-	-	-
Futuna	524	-	-	-
ʻUvea	143	469	13.30°S 176.17°W	Holocene
