= List of volcanoes in Europe =

Though Canary Islands geographically are part of the African Plate and are generally considered part of the African continent, they administratively belong to Spain and therefore volcanoes of the islands are on this list.

Name	Location	Elevation (m)	Coordinates	Last eruption	Notes
Askja	Iceland	1,516 m (4,974 ft)	65°01′48″N 16°45′00″W	1961	
Eldfell	Iceland	200 m (660 ft)	63°25′57″N 20°14′51″W	1973	
Krafla	Iceland	800 m (2,600 ft)	65°44′0″N 16°47′0″W	1984	
Surtsey	Iceland	200 m (660 ft)	63°18′11″N 20°36′18″W	1963	
Fagradalsfjall	Iceland	385 m (1,263 ft)	63°54′18″N 22°16′21″W	2023	
Krýsuvík (volcanic system)	Iceland	393 m (1,289 ft)	63°55′48″N 22°06′00″W	1188	
Eldey	Iceland	393 m (1,289 ft)	63°55′48″N 22°06′00″W	1926	
Brennisteinsfjöll	Iceland	655 m (2,149 ft)	63°55′N 21°48′W	Late 10th Century AD	
Mount Elbrus	Russia	5,642 m (18,510 ft)	43°21′18″N 42°26′21″E	about 50 years AD	
Teide	Tenerife, Canary Islands, Spain	3,718 m (12,198 ft)	28°16.8′N 16°38.1′W	November 1909	
Mount Etna	Sicily, Italy	3,329 m (10,922 ft)	37°45.3′N 14°59.7′E	Ongoing	
Mount Pico	Ilha do Pico, Azores, Portugal	2,351 m (7,713 ft)	38°28′08″N 28°23′56″W	1718	
Nea Kameni	Santorini, Greece	118 m (387 ft)	36°24′00″N 25°24′00″E	1950	
Beerenberg	Jan Mayen, Norway	2,277 m (7,470 ft)	71°4′36″N 8°9′52″W	1985	
Öræfajökull	Iceland	2,110 m (6,920 ft)	64°00′N 16°39′W	1727–1728	
Bárðarbunga	Iceland	2,009 m (6,591 ft)		2014–2015	
Cumbre Vieja	La Palma, Canary Islands, Spain	1,949 m (6,394 ft)	28°34′N 17°50′W	2021	
Mounts of Cantal	France	1,855 m (6,086 ft)	45°03′31″N 2°45′41″E	2 million years ago	
Puy de Dôme	France	1,465 m (4,806 ft)	45°46′19″N 02°57′45″E	10,700 years ago	Carbonized plant fragments at the location were found to have formed c.10,700 years ago.
Monte Amiata	Italy	1,738 m (5,702 ft)		180,000 years ago	
Grímsvötn	Iceland	1,725 m (5,659 ft)	64°25′12″N 17°19′48″W	2011	
Eyjafjallajökull	Iceland	1,666 m (5,466 ft)	63°37′12″N 19°36′48″W	2010	
Katla	Iceland	1,512 m (4,961 ft)	63°38′N 19°03′W	1918	Possible later minor eruptions did not melt covering ice.
Hekla	Iceland	1,491 m (4,892 ft)	63°59′N 19°42′W	2000	
Snæfellsjökull	Iceland	1,448 m (4,751 ft)	64°48′N 23°47′W	200 AD	
Monte Vulture	Italy	1,326 m (4,350 ft)	40°56′54″N 15°38′08″E	40,000 years ago	
Ciomad	Romania	1,289 m (4,229 ft)	46°08′N 25°53′E	32,600 to 27,500 years ago	
Mount Vesuvius	Italy	1,281 m (4,203 ft)	40°49′N 14°26′E	1944	
Colli Albani	Italy	950 m (3,120 ft)		7,000 years ago	
Stromboli	Aeolian Islands, Italy	924 m (3,031 ft)	38°47′38″N 15°12′40″E	Ongoing	
Phlegraean Fields	Italy	458 m (1,503 ft)	40.827°N 14.139°E	1538	
Vulcano	Aeolian Islands, Italy	499 m (1,637 ft)	38°24′15″N 14°57′57″E	1888–1890	
Volcanic Eifel	Eifel, Germany	699.9 m (2,296 ft)		10 000 to 20 000 years ago	
Capelinhos	Faial Island, Azores	501 m (1,644 ft)	38.601°N 28.834°W	1957-1958 (13 months)	

== See also ==
- Lists of volcanoes in Europe by country
- Volcanic Eifel
