= List of volcanoes in South Africa =

This is a list of active, dormant and extinct volcanoes in South Africa.

Name	Elevation		Location	Last eruption
Name	meters	feet	Coordinates	Last eruption
African continent
Pilanesberg			25.248°S 27.084°E	Proterozoic
Salpeterkop			32.474890°S 20.842429°E	Cretaceous
Prince Edward Islands in the Indian Ocean
Marion Island	1230	4035	46.90°S 37.75°E	2008
Prince Edward Island	672	2205	46.63°S 37.95°E	Holocene
