= Mount Fijelvingue =

Mountain in Equatorial Guinea

Mount Fijelvingue is a mountain in Equatorial Guinea. At 1,500 metres above sea level, it is the highest point of the central plateau that occupies the inland of the country's mainland.
