= Cortes (surname) =

Cortés (Castilian, Galician, Valencian), Cortês (Portuguese), Cortès (Catalan) is a surname of Spanish and Portuguese origin, respectively. The surname derived from the Old French corteis or curteis, meaning 'courteous' or 'polite', and is related to the English Curtis.

The surname has become more frequent among Romani people in Spain than among the general Spanish population.

Notable people surnamed either Cortes or Cortés include:

== Mononymously known as Cortes ==
- Hernán Cortés, (1485–1547), Spanish conquistador

== Arts and entertainment ==
=== Film and television ===
- Armand Cortes (1880–1948), American actor
- Fernando Cortés (1909–1979), Puerto Rican actor
- Fred Cortes (1921–1964), Filipino actor
- Irene Cortes (artist) (born 1979), filmmaker and artist
- Jean-Louis Cortès, French pianist and composer
- Mapita Cortés (1939–2006), Puerto Rican actress
- Mapy Cortés (1910–1998), Puerto Rican actress

=== Music ===
- Aracy Cortes (1904–1985), Brazilian singer
- Carlos Núñez Cortés (born 1942), Argentine musician
- Edmundo Villani-Côrtes (born 1930), Brazilian musical artist
- Garðar Thór Cortes (born 1974), Icelandic tenor
- Getúlio Côrtes (born 1938), Brazilian musical artist
- Lula Côrtes (1949–2011), Brazilian musician
- Montse Cortés (born 1972), Spanish flamenco singer
- Pamela Cortes, Ecuadorian singer, actress and dancer
- Ramiro Cortés (1933–1984), American composer
- Rodrigo Cortés (born 1973), Spanish film director, film producer, screenwriter and film editor
- Santiago Cortés (musician), Latino-Swiss musician and composer
- Sergio Iván Esquivel Cortés (1946–2021), Mexican singer-songwriter
- Tony Cortes (born 1968), Cuban American actor and TV host
- Yara Cortes (1921–2002), Brazilian actress

=== Other arts and entertainment ===
- Alfonso Cortés (1893–1969), Nicaraguan poet
- Ana Cortés (1895–1998), Chilean painter
- Bernardo Cortés (1934–2017), Spanish writer, humorist, singer and songwriter
- Carmina Useros Cortés (1928–2017), Spanish author
- Édouard Cortès (1882–1969) French Post-Impressionist painter
- Esperanza Cortes (born 1957), American visual artist
- Gustavo Couttolenc Cortés (1921–2015), Mexican writer and academic
- Jesús Carranza Cortés, Mexican potter
- Joaquín Cortés (born 1969), Spanish flamenco dancer
- Liliana Angulo Cortés (1974–2026), Colombian visual artist
- Ney Yépez Cortés (born 1968), Ecuadorian writer
- Ricardo Cortés (illustrator) (born 1973), illustrator and author
- Sonya Cortés (born 1962), Puerto Rican entertainer

== Politics ==
- Adriana Fuentes Cortés (born 1968), Mexican politician
- Alberto Baltra Cortés (1912–1981), Chilean politician and economist
- Altineu Côrtes (born 1968), Brazilian politician and businessman
- Bob Cortes (born 1963), politician in the Florida House of Representatives
- David Cortés (politician) (1955–2015), Bolivian politician
- David Bonilla Cortés (born 1974), Puerto Rican politician
- Hilario Sánchez Cortés (born 1957), Mexican politician
- John Cortes (Florida politician) (born 1961), politician in the Florida House of Representatives
- John Cortes (Gibraltarian politician), member of the Gibraltar Socialist Labour Party
- Jonas Cortes (born 1966), Filipino politician
- José Cortés López (1883–1958), Spanish magistrate and politician
- Judith Pallarés i Cortés (born 1972), Andorran politician
- Julio Cortes (politician), American politician
- León Cortés Castro (1882–1946), Costa Rican politician
- Luz Virginia Cortés (born 1976), Mexican politician
- Manuel Cortés Quero (1906–1991), Spanish politician
- Mario Mendoza Cortés (1968–2015), Mexican politician
- Pedro Cortés (born 1966), Puerto Rican politician
- Rosalío Cortés (1820–1884), 35th President of Nicaragua
- Santiago Pedro Cortés (born 1954), Mexican politician
- Sara Isabel Castellanos Cortés (born 1946), Mexican politician
- Yulenny Cortés León (born 1976), Mexican politician

== Sports ==
=== Baseball ===
- Aurelio Cortés (1904–?), Cuban catcher in the Negro baseball leagues
- Carlos Cortes (born 1997), American baseball player
- Dan Cortes (born 1987), American baseball player
- David Cortés (baseball) (born 1983), Mexican baseball player
- Nestor Cortés Jr. (born 1994), Cuban-American baseball pitcher

=== Football/soccer ===
- Adrián Cortés (born 1983), Mexican footballer
- Ascanio Cortés (1914–1998), Chilean footballer
- Brandon Cortés (born 2001), Argentine-Chilean footballer
- Brayan Cortés (born 1995), Chilean footballer
- Bruno Cortês (born 1987), Brazilian footballer
- Bryan Cortés (born 1991), Chilean footballer
- César Cortés (born 1984), Chilean footballer
- David Cortés (Colombian footballer) (born 1992), Colombian footballer
- David Cortés (Spanish footballer) (born 1979), Spanish footballer
- Diego Cortés (born 1998), Mexican footballer
- Eduardo Cortes (born 1993), Mexican footballer
- Efraín Cortés (born 1984), Colombian footballer
- Fabián Núñez Cortés (born 1992), Chilean footballer
- Félix Cortés (born 1989), Chilean footballer
- Fernando Cortés (footballer) (born 1988), Mexican footballer
- Fran Cortés (born 1986), Spanish footballer
- Gerardo Cortés (born 1988), Chilean footballer
- Jaime Antonio de Gracia Cortes (born 1996), Panamanian footballer
- Javier Cortés (born 1989), Mexican footballer
- José Cortés (footballer) (born 1994), Colombian footballer
- Julio Cortes (American football) (born 1962), American football player
- Julio César Cortés (1941–2025), Uruguayan footballer and coach
- Kevin Manzano Cortés (born 1999), Spanish footballer
- Martín Miguel Cortés (born 1983), Argentine footballer
- Maurício Cortés (born 1997), Colombian footballer
- Nilson Cortes (born 1977), Colombian footballer
- Óscar Cortés (footballer, born 1968), Colombian footballer
- Óscar Cortés (footballer, born 2003), Colombian footballer
- Rafael García Cortés (born 1958), Spanish footballer
- Ramiro Cortés (footballer) (1931–2016), Chilean footballer
- Ranulfo Cortés (1931–1994), Mexican footballer
- Roberto Cortés (Chilean footballer) (1902–1975), Chilean football goalkeeper
- Roberto Carlos Cortés (born 1977), Colombian football defender
- Róger Cortés (born 2000), Costa Rican footballer
- Santiago Cortés (footballer) (1945–2011), El Salvadoran footballer
- Víctor Cortés (born 1976), Colombian footballer
- Walter Cortés (born 2000), Costa Rican footballer

=== Other sports ===
- Alejandro Cortés (cyclist) (born 1977), Colombian road cyclist
- Beatriz Gómez Cortés (born 1994), Spanish Olympic swimmer
- Federico Cortés (born 1937), Argentine cyclist
- Gaston Cortes (born 1985), Argentinian international rugby union player
- Gerardo Cortes Sr. (1928–?), a Chilean modern pentathlete
- Gerardo Cortes Jr. (born 1959), a Chilean modern pentathlete, and son of Gerardo Cortes Sr.
- Jaime Cortés (born 1964), Colombian tennis player
- Jesús Iglesias Cortés (born 1968), Spanish swimmer
- Máximo Cortés (born 1988), Spanish racing driver
- Omar Cortés (born 1977), Spanish gymnast
- Onix Cortés (born 1988), Cuban judoka
- Peter Cortes (born 1947), American rower
- Phil Cortes (born 1982), Canadian racing cyclist
- Ramiro Cortés (basketball) (1931–1977), Uruguayan basketball player
- Ricardo Cortés (born 1980), Mexican boxer
- Sergio Cortés (born 1968), Chilean tennis player

== Other people ==
- Beltrán Cortés (1908–1984), Costa Rican murderer
- Corinna Cortes (born 1961), Danish computer scientist
- Enric Cortès (born 1939), Catalan Capuchin and biblical scholar
- Ernesto Cortes, American community activist
- Irene Cortes (1921–1996), Associate Justice of the Supreme Court of the Philippines
- José Cortés de Madariaga (1766–1826), Chilean patriot
- José Muñoz Cortés (1948–1997), Greek clergyman
- Juan Donoso Cortés (1809–1853), Spanish counter-revolutionary, author, and theologian
- Luis G. Cortes, Spanish chess player
- Manuel Cortes (born 1967), British trade unionist
- Margarita Letelier Cortés, Chilean entrepreneur
- Martín Cortés de Albacar (1510–1582), Spanish cosmographer
- Martín Cortés (son of Malinche) (1523–?), son of Hernán Cortés and La Malinche
- Martín Cortés, 2nd Marqués del Valle de Oaxaca (1532–1589), Spanish noble, son of Hernán Cortes
- Oralia Garza de Cortes, librarian, advocate, and bibliographer
- Xavier Cortés Rocha (born 1943), Mexican architect and former rector of the UNAM

== See also ==
- Cortes (disambiguation)
- Cortese (surname)
- Cortez (disambiguation)
- Courtois (disambiguation)
