= Cortese (surname) =

Cortese is a surname of Italian origin. Notable people with the surname are as follows:

- Anthony Cortese (born 1947), US environmental scientist
- Bob Cortese (born 1943), US college football coach
- Cristoforo Cortese (c. 1399–1445), Venetian miniaturist and illuminator
- Dan Cortese (born 1967), US actor
- David D. Cortese (born 1956), US political figure (Santa Clara County, California Supervisor)
- Deena Cortese (born 1987), American television personality, Jersey Shore
- Domenico Tarcisio Cortese (1931–2011), Roman Catholic Bishop of Mileto-Nicotera-Tropea
- Dominic L. Cortese (born 1932), US political figure (California state legislator 1980–96)
- Enrico Cortese (born 1985), Italian footballer
- Federico Cortese, music director of the Boston Youth Symphony Orchestras and conductor of the Harvard-Radcliffe Orchestra
- Franco Cortese (1903–1986), Italian auto racing driver
- Genevieve Cortese (born 1981), US television actress
- Giovanni Andrea Cortese (1483–1548), Italian cardinal and monastic reformer
- Giulio Cesare Cortese (1570–1640), Italian writer
- Guido Cortese (1908–1964), Italian lawyer and politician
- Guillaume Courtois (1628–1679), French-born artist who flourished in Rome, where he was known as Guglielmo Cortese
- Isabella Cortese (fl. 1561), Italian alchemist and writer of the Renaissance
- Joe Cortese (born 1948), US actor
- Laura Cortese (f. 1990s–2000s), US musician
- Leonardo Cortese (1916–1984), Italian film actor and director
- Leone Cortese (died 1496), Roman Catholic prelate, Bishop of Acerra
- Matias Cortese (born 1985), Argentine rugby union player
- Nicola Cortese (born 1968), Italian banker
- Nicolò Cortese (1907–1934), Roman Catholic parish priest and director for the Il Messaggero di Sant'Antonio magazine in Padua before and during World War II, Servant of God
- Pete Cortese (f. 1990s–2000s), US musician
- Rita Cortese (born 1949), Argentine actress and singer
- Sandro Cortese (born 1990), German motorcycle racer
- Shane Cortese (born 1968), New Zealand actor and singer
- Valentina Cortese (1923–2019), Italian actress

== See also ==
- Cortesi (disambiguation)
- Cortes (surname)
- Cortese List, Californian planning document about the location of hazardous materials release sites
