= Friedrich Robert von Beringe =

German Army officer (1865–1940)

Friedrich Robert von Beringe (21 September 1865 – 5 July 1940) was an Imperial German Army officer, born in Aschersleben. He was the son of Mathilde Luise and Captain Karl Robert von Beringe. In the small town in what is now Saxony-Anhalt, which then belonged to the Kingdom of Prussia, his father was a cavalry officer commanding a squadron of the 10th (Magdeburg) Hussars. Friedrich Robert followed his father's footsteps, becoming an officer in the Hussars Regiment No. 1. He was honored with the regimental ring, and became a close friend of August von Mackensen, later becoming a Field Marshal, who commanded the regiment from 17 June 1893 to 27 January 1898.

In 1894 von Beringe volunteered for the recently created Schutztruppe, the protective force of German East Africa, and he was promoted to captain in 1899.

Captain von Beringe, together with a physician, Dr. Engeland, a Corporal Ehrhardt, and twenty local troops with equipment and native porters left Usumbura (modern Bujumbura) in German East Africa on 19 August 1902. Their destination was the King Yuhi V Musinga of Rwanda. They then headed north to the volcanic Virunga Mountains. On 17 October 1902 he shot two large apes that were unknown to science at the time. He sent them to the Natural History Museum in Berlin, where they were examined and documented by Paul Matschie. The species was named Gorilla beringei in his honor, a gorilla species distinct from the previously discovered western gorilla ("Gorilla gorilla"). This new species, commonly called "eastern gorilla", was later determined to consist of two subspecies: the mountain gorilla (Gorilla beringei beringei) and the eastern lowland gorilla (Gorilla beringei graueri).

In 1906, Captain von Beringe moved back to Germany. Until the beginning of World War II, he lived with his family in Dresden. On 5 July 1940, he died in Stettin after years of suffering from diabetes. A memorial plaque is dedicated to von Beringe at the entrance to the 400 square kilometer Virunga National Park.
