= Yepez =

Yepez is a surname. Notable people with the surname include:

- Andreina Yépez (1974–2026), Venezuelan actress
- Engracia Pastora Pérez Yépez (1910–2015), Venezuelan culinary artisan
- Enrique Espín Yépez (1926–1997), Ecuadorean composer
- Juan Yepez (born 1998), Venezuelan baseball player
- María Fernanda Yépez (born 1980), Colombian actress
- Ney Yépez Cortés (born 1968), Ecuadorian writer
- Olavo Yépez (1937–2021), Ecuadorian chess master
- Trotzky Augusto Yepez Obando (1940–2010), Ecuadorian chess player

== See also ==
- Yepes (surname)
