= Marco Madrigal =

Costa Rican footballer (born 1985)

Personal information
- Full name: Marco Antonio Madrigal Villalobos
- Date of birth: 3 December 1985 (age 40)
- Place of birth: San José, Costa Rica
- Height: 1.80 m (5 ft 11 in)
- Position: Goalkeeper

Youth career
- Aserri

Senior career*
Years	Team	Apps	(Gls)
2010–2011	Aserri	10	(0)
2011–2014	Carmelita	49	(0)
2014	Universitarios	4	(0)
2015	A.D. Zeledón	7	(0)
2015–2017	Santos de Guápiles	51	(0)
2017–2018	Cartaginés	5	(0)
2018	Uruguay de Coronado	0	(0)
2018–2019	San Carlos	57	(0)
2020	Coatepeque		
2020–2021	Cartaginés	12	(0)
2021	Liberia		
2022	Uruguay de Coronado		
2023	Santa Ana		
2024	Guadalupe		

International career
2015–2019	Costa Rica	2	(0)
- * Club domestic league appearances and goals as of 07 January 2023

Marco Madrigal (born 3 August 1985) is a Costa Rican former professional footballer who plays as a goalkeeper. In his career he won two international caps for Costa Rica.

== Career ==
Madrigal made his debut for the senior Costa Rica national football team against Nicaragua in December 2015. Madrigal represented Costa Rica against Venezuela in February 2016.
