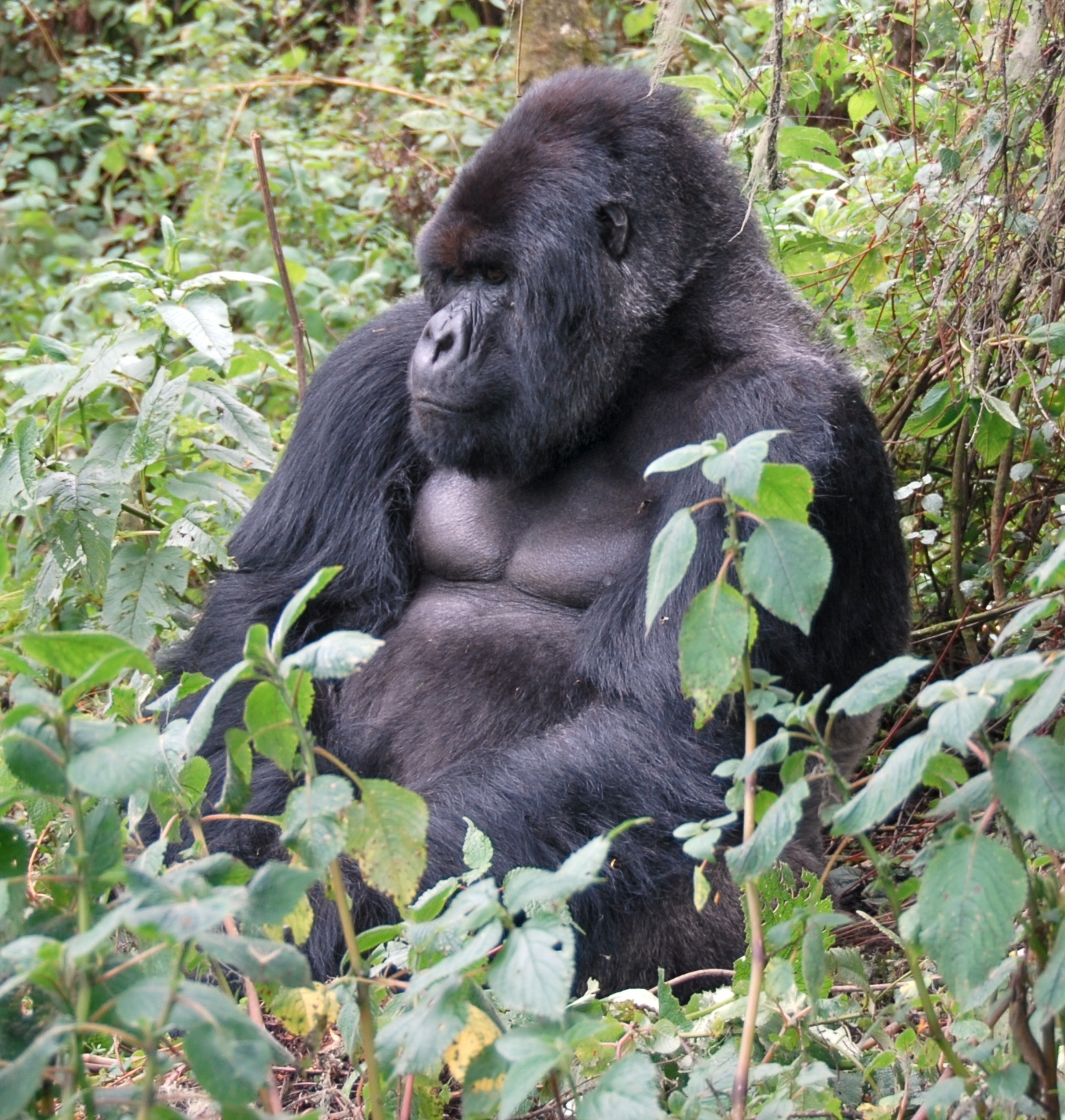
- Male mountain gorilla
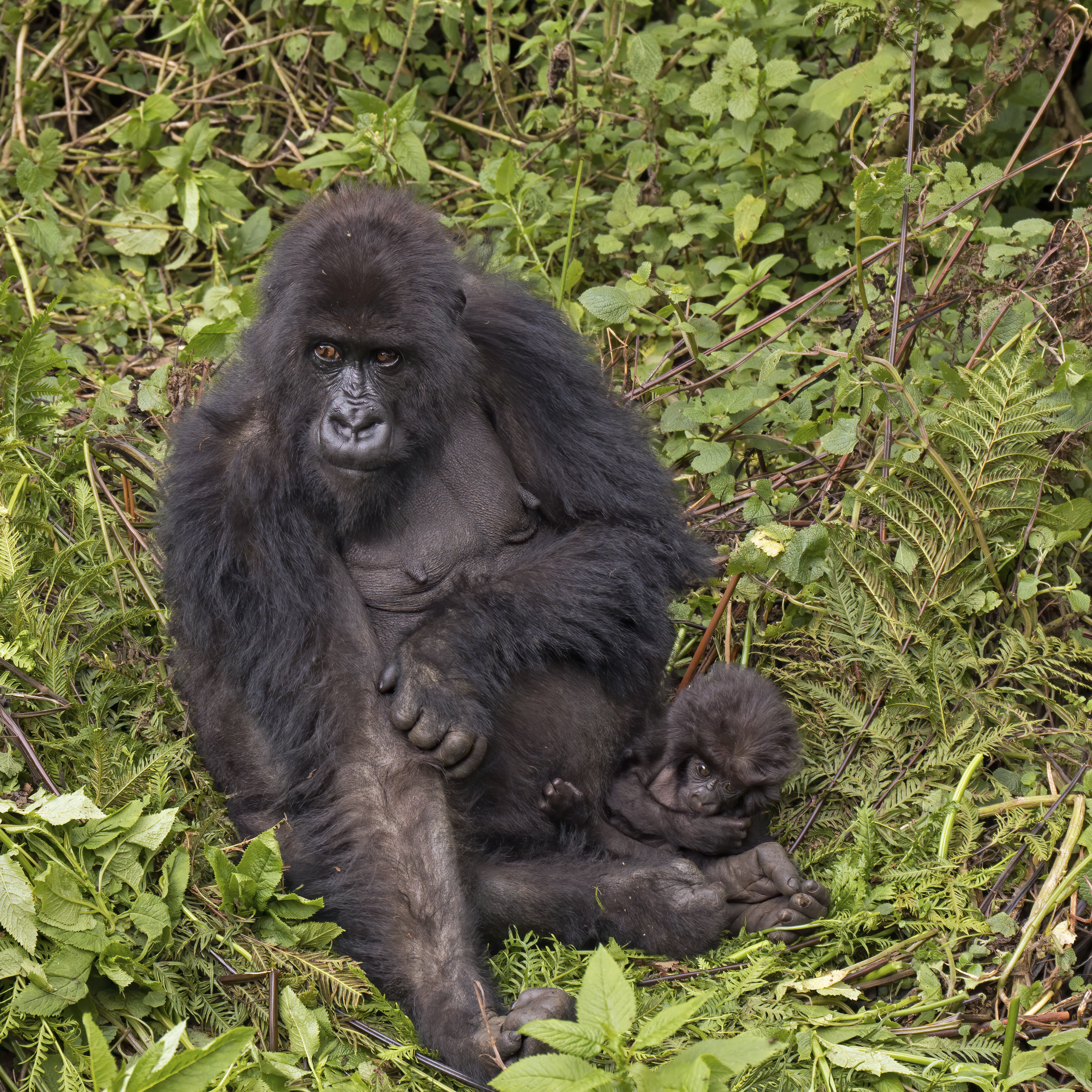
- Female and baby mountain gorillas

Conservation status
- Endangered (IUCN 3.1)
- CITES Appendix I

Scientific classification
- Kingdom: Animalia
- Phylum: Chordata
- Class: Mammalia
- Order: Primates
- Superfamily: Hominoidea
- Family: Hominidae
- Genus: Gorilla
- Species: G. beringei
- Subspecies: G. b. beringei

Trinomial name
- Gorilla beringei beringei Matschie, 1903
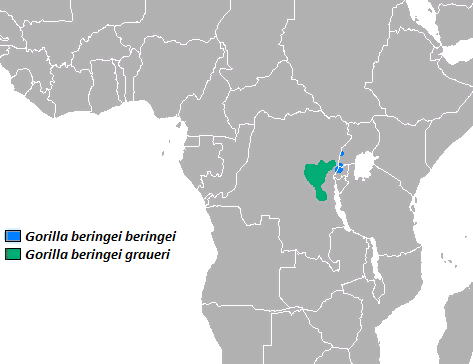
- Distribution range in blue

= Mountain gorilla =

Subspecies of the eastern gorilla

The mountain gorilla (Gorilla beringei beringei) is one of the two subspecies of the eastern gorilla. It is listed as endangered by the IUCN as of 2018.

There are two populations: One lives in the Virunga Mountains in Mgahinga in southwestern Uganda, Volcanoes in northwestern Rwanda and Virunga National Park in the eastern Democratic Republic of Congo. The other population lives in Uganda's Bwindi Impenetrable National Park. Some primatologists speculate the Bwindi population is a separate subspecies. As of 2019, there are an estimated 1,063 mountain gorillas in the world.

== Evolution, taxonomy, and classification ==
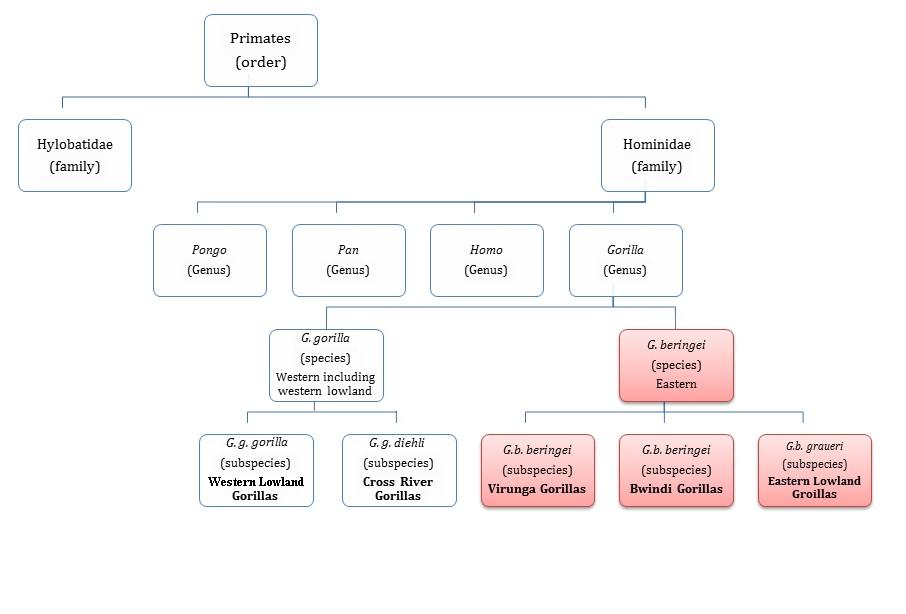
Gorilla taxonomy

Mountain gorillas are descendants of ancestral monkeys and apes found in Africa and Arabia during the start of the Oligocene epoch (34–24 million years ago). The fossil record provides evidence of the hominoid primates (apes) found in East Africa approximately 22–32 million years ago. The fossil record of the area where mountain gorillas live is particularly poor and so its evolutionary history is not clear.

It was about 8.8 to 12 million years ago that the group of primates who were to evolve into gorillas split from their common ancestor with humans and chimps; this is when the genus Gorilla emerged. Mountain gorillas have been isolated from eastern lowland gorillas for approximately 10,000 years and these two taxa separated from their western counterparts approximately 1.2 to 3 million years ago. The genus was first referenced as Troglodytes in 1847, but renamed to Gorilla in 1852. It was not until 1967 that the taxonomist Colin Groves proposed that all gorillas be regarded as one species (Gorilla gorilla) with three subspecies Gorilla gorilla gorilla (western lowland gorilla), Gorilla gorilla graueri (lowland gorillas found west of the Virungas) and Gorilla gorilla beringei (mountain gorillas, including Gorilla beringei, found in the Virungas and Bwindi). In 2003, after a review, they were divided into two species (Gorilla gorilla and Gorilla beringei) by The World Conservation Union (IUCN). There is now agreement that there are two species, each with two subspecies.

== Characteristics ==
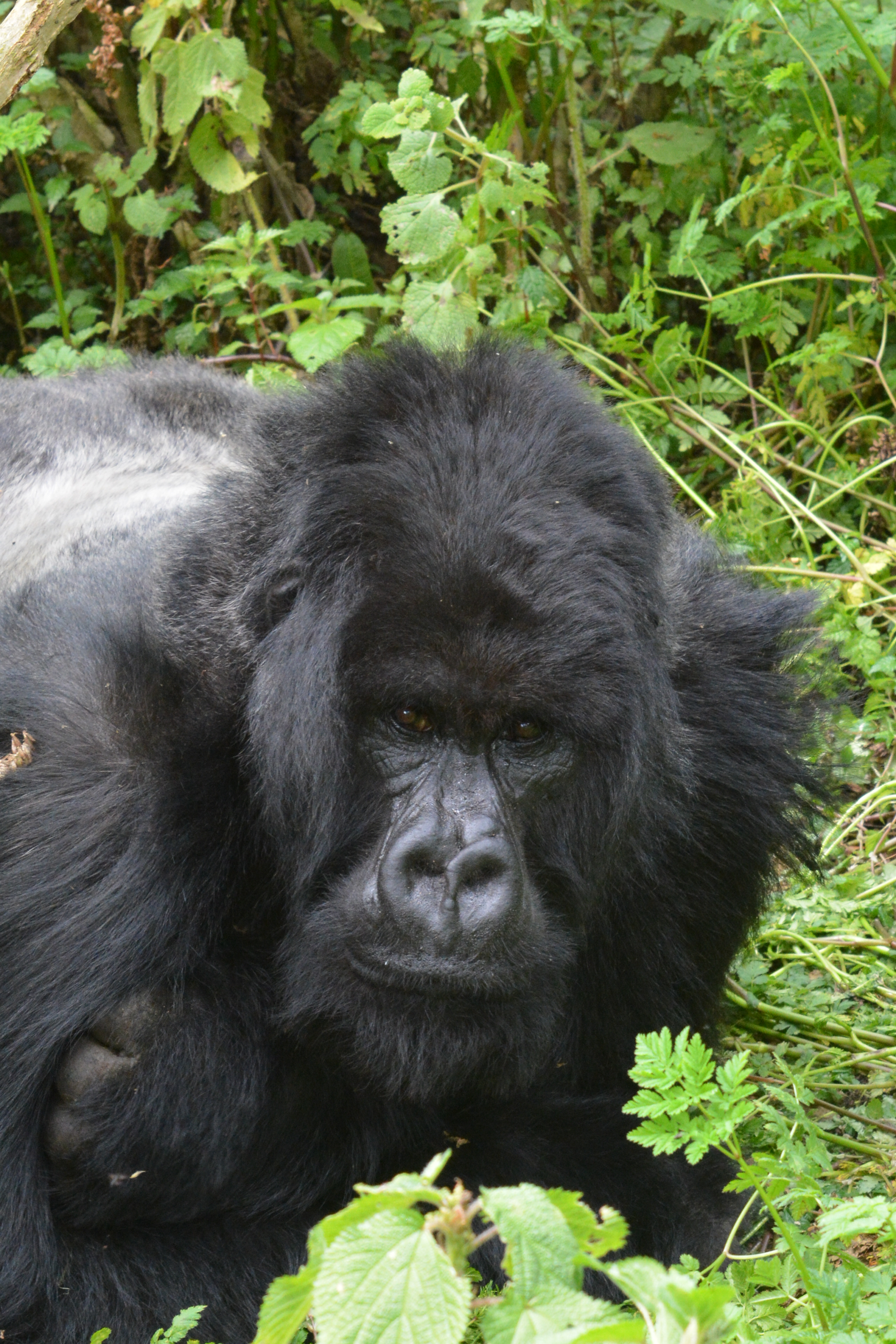
Silverback of Ntambara group, in typical resting attitude

The fur of the mountain gorilla, often thicker and longer than that of other gorilla species, enables them to live in colder temperatures. Gorillas can be identified by nose prints unique to each individual.

Males reach a standing height of 1.61–1.71 m (5.3–5.6 ft), a girth of 1.38–1.63 m (4.5–5.3 ft), an arm span of 2 to 2.7 m (6.6 to 8.9 ft) and a weight of 120–191 kg (265–421 lb). Females are smaller with a weight of 70–98 kg (154–216 lb). This subspecies is smaller than the eastern lowland gorilla, the other subspecies of eastern gorilla. Adult males have more pronounced bony crests on the top and back of their skulls, giving their heads a more conical shape. These crests anchor the powerful temporalis muscles, which attach to the lower jaw (mandible). Adult females also have these crests, but they are less pronounced. Like all gorillas, they feature dark brown eyes framed by a black ring around the iris. Adult males are called silverbacks because a saddle of gray or silver-colored hair develops on their backs with age. The hair on their backs is shorter than on most other body parts, and their arm hair is especially long. Fully erect males average 1.7 m (5.6 ft) in height, with an arm span of 2.3 m (7.5 ft) and weigh 155 kg (342 lb). The tallest silverback recorded was 1.95 m (6.4 ft) tall with an arm span of 2.7 m (8.9 ft), a chest of 1.98 m (6.5 ft), and a weight of 219 kg (483 lb), shot in Alimbongo, northern Kivu in May 1938. There is an unconfirmed record of another individual, shot in 1932, that was 2.06 m (6.8 ft) and weighed 218.6 kg (482 lb). The heaviest silverback to ever live in captivity was a gorilla named N'gagi, a gorilla at the San Diego Zoo who died in 1944. His heaviest weight in life was 683 lb (310 kg), but at the time of his death, he was 636 lb (288 kg).

The mountain gorilla is primarily terrestrial and quadrupedal. However, it will climb into fruiting trees if the branches can carry its weight. Like all great apes other than humans, its arms are longer than its legs. It moves by knuckle-walking, supporting its weight on the backs of its curved fingers rather than its palms.

The mountain gorilla is diurnal, spending most of the day eating, as large quantities of food are needed to sustain its massive bulk. It forages in the early morning, rests during the late morning and around midday, and in the afternoon it forages again before resting at night. Each gorilla builds a nest from surrounding vegetation to sleep in, constructing a new one every evening. Only infants sleep in the same nest as their mothers. They leave their sleeping sites when the sun rises at around 6 am, except when it is cold and overcast; then they often stay longer in their nests.

== Distribution and habitat ==
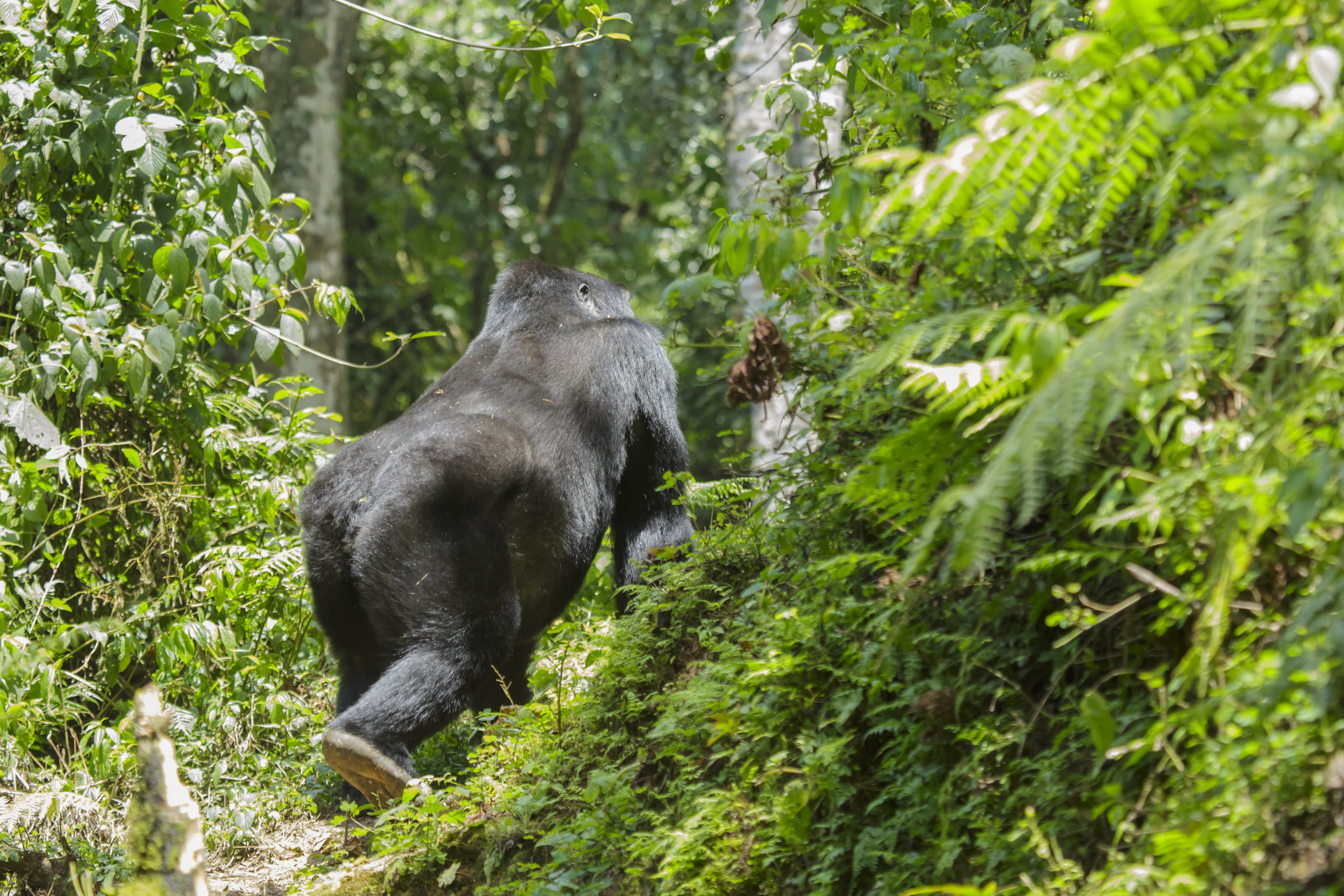
Mountain gorilla

The mountain gorilla inhabits the Albertine Rift montane cloud forest, including the Virunga Mountains, ranging in elevation from 2,200 to 4,300 m (7,200 to 14,100 ft). Most groups live on the slopes of three of the dormant volcanoes: Karisimbi, Mikeno, and Visoke. The vegetation is very dense at the bottom of the mountains, becoming more sparse at higher elevations, and the forests are often cloudy, misty and cold. The mountain gorilla also occasionally uses the border habitat with the Rwenzori-Virunga montane moorlands, at elevations higher than the Albertine Rift montane cloud forest.

== Behaviour and ecology ==
The home range used by one group of gorillas during one year is influenced by availability of food sources and usually includes several vegetation zones. George Schaller identified ten distinct zones, including: bamboo forest at 2,200–2,800 m (7,200–9,200 ft); Hagenia forest at 2,800–3,400 m (9,200–11,200 ft); and the giant senecio zone at 3,400–4,300 m (11,200–14,100 ft). The mountain gorilla spends most of its time in Hagenia forest, where galium vines are found year-round. All parts of this vine are consumed: leaves, stems, flowers, and berries. It travels to the bamboo forest during the few months of the year when fresh shoots are available, and it climbs into subalpine regions to eat the soft centers of giant senecio trees.

=== Diet ===
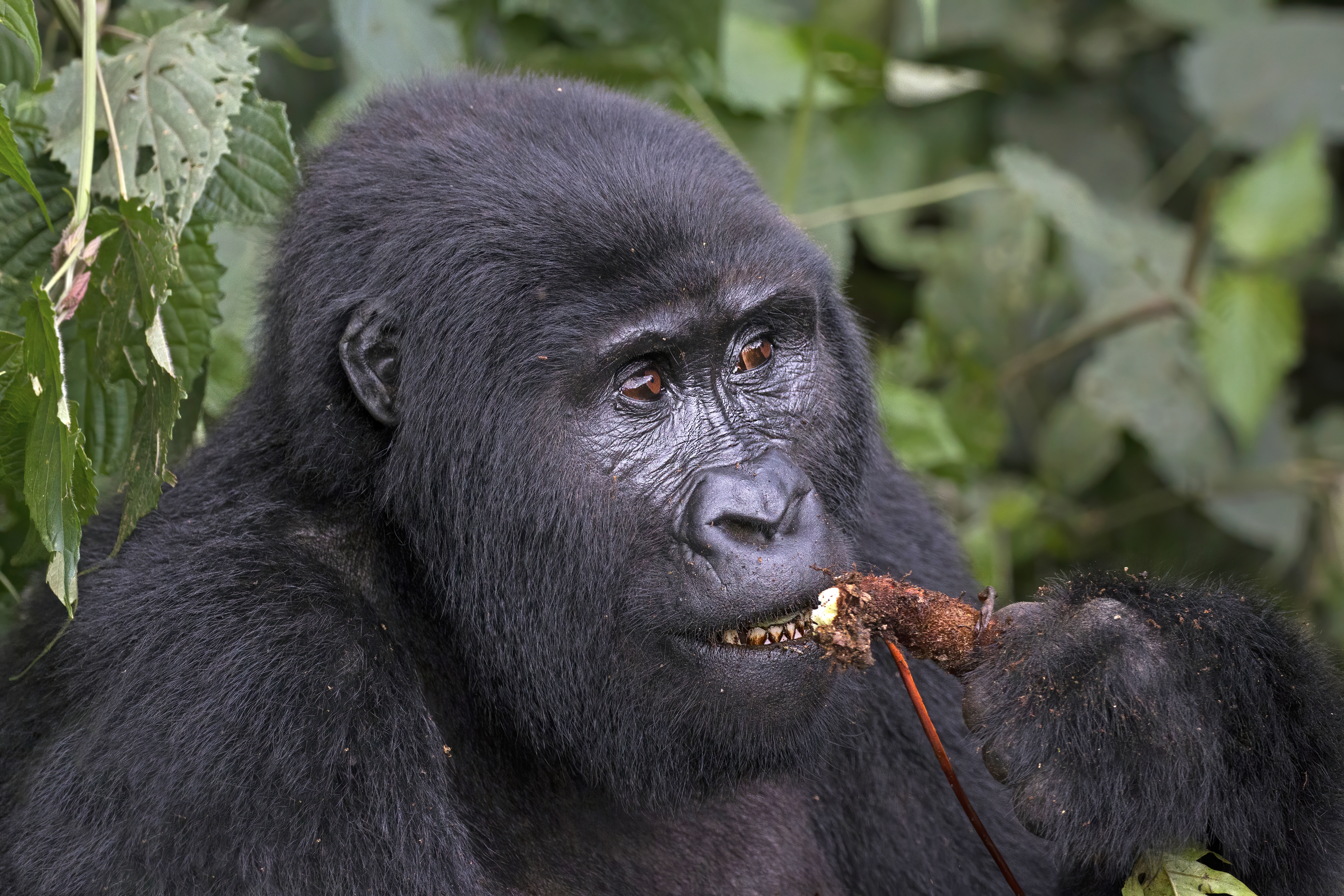
Female eating root

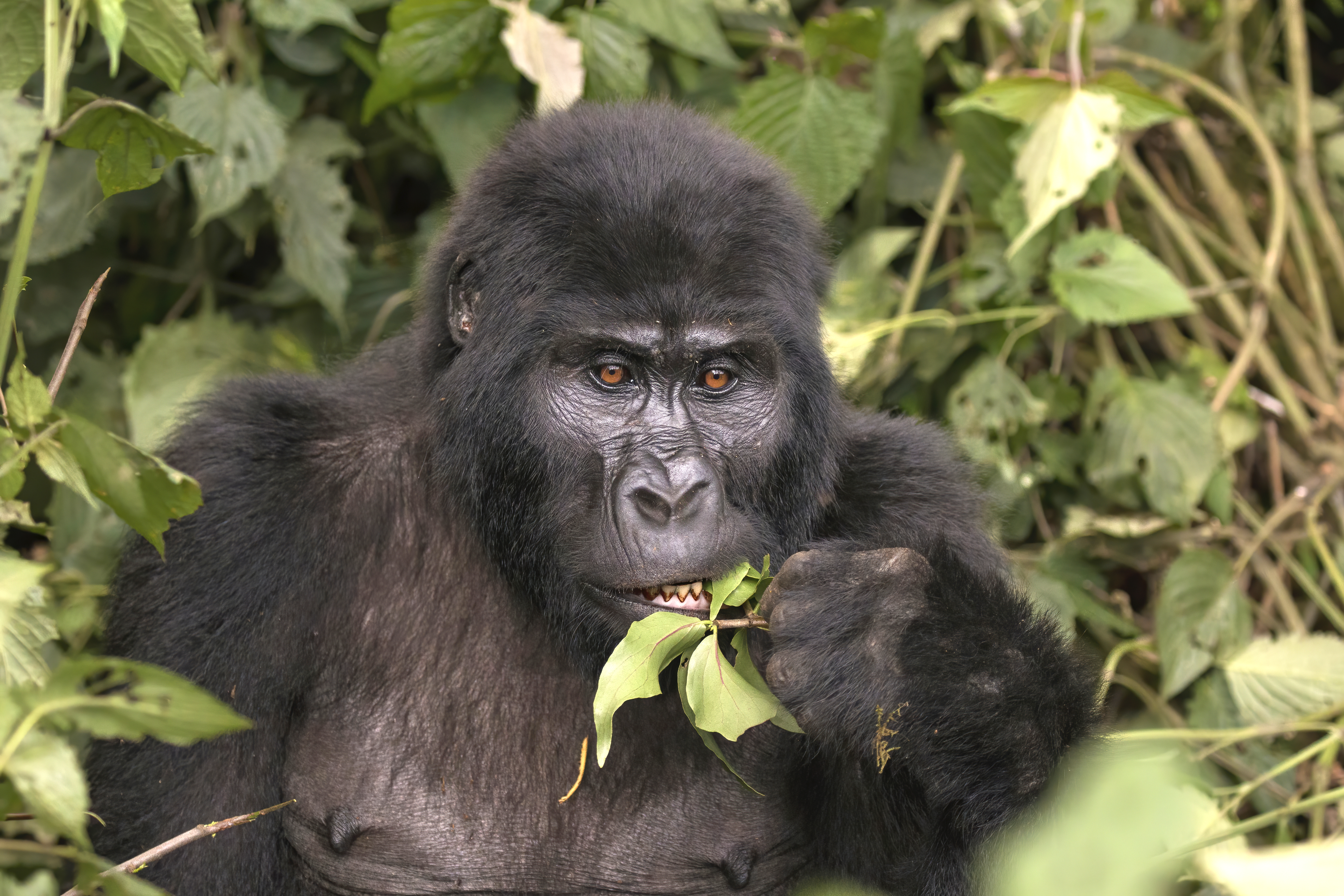
Female eating leaves

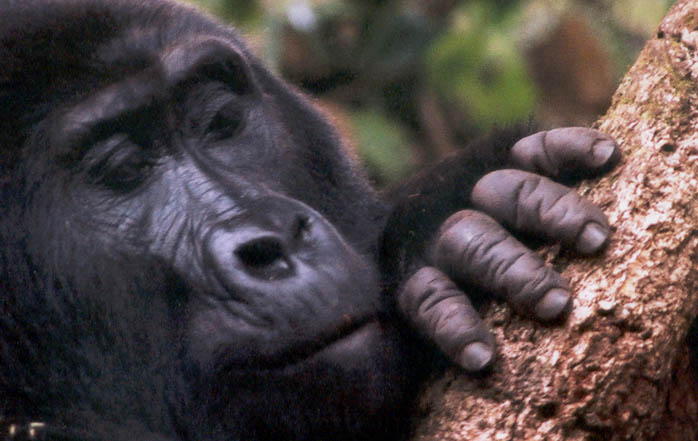
Male feeding on insects in a rotting tree trunk

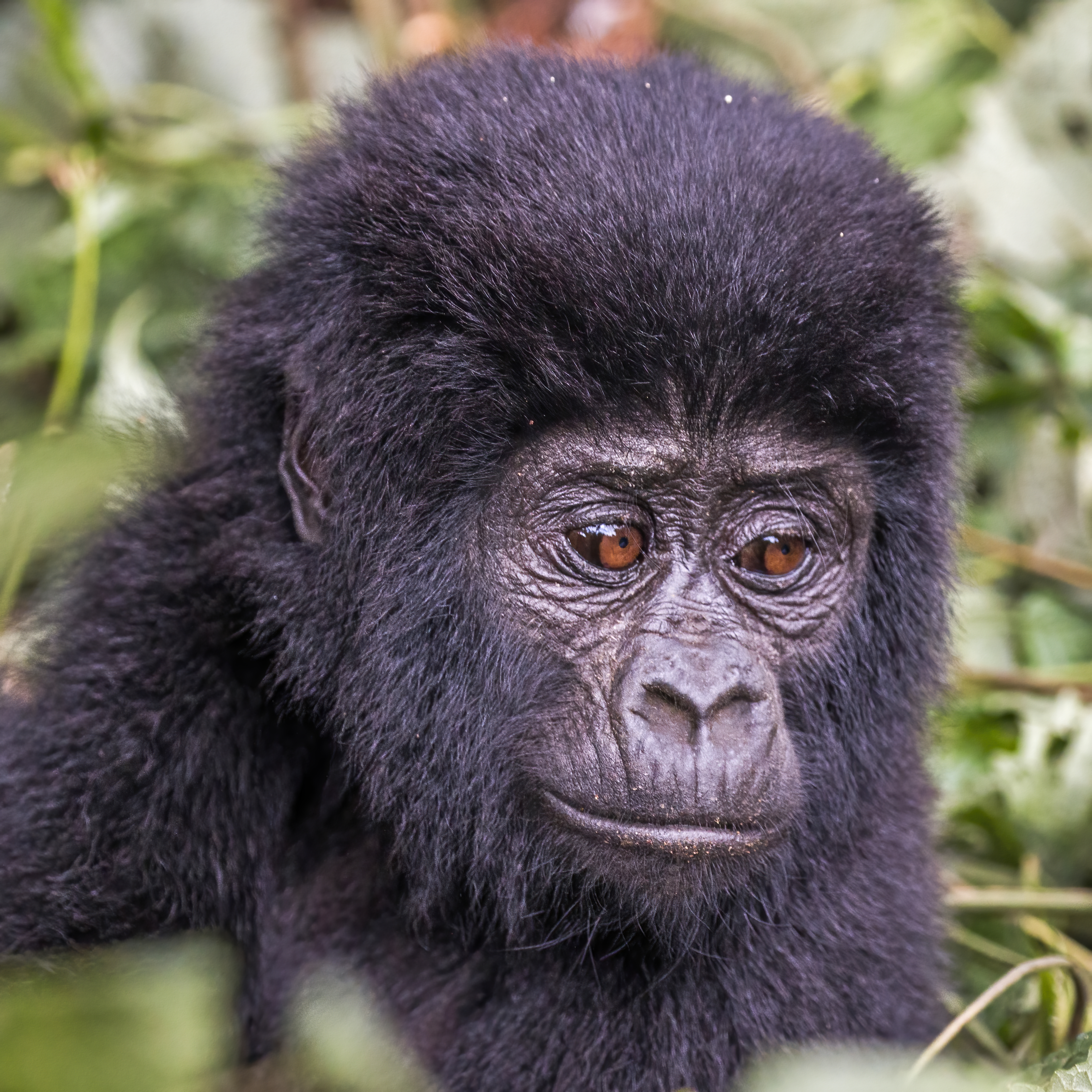
A two-year old gorilla

The mountain gorilla is primarily a herbivore; the majority of its diet is composed of the leaves, shoots, stems, and pith (85.8%) of 142 plant species. It also feeds on bark and wood (6.9%), roots and their epithelium (3.3%), flowers (2.3%), and fruit (1.7%), as well as insects, fungi, galls, and gorilla dung (0.1%). In a year long study in Bwindi Impenetrable Forest adult males ate an average of 18.8 kg (41 lb) of food a day, while females ate 14.9 kg (33 lb).

=== Social structure ===
The mountain gorilla is highly social, and lives in relatively stable, cohesive groups held together by long-term bonds between adult males and females. Relationships among females are relatively weak. These groups are nonterritorial; the silverback generally defends his group rather than his territory. In the Virunga mountain gorillas, the average length of tenure for a dominant silverback is 4.7 years.

61% of groups are composed of one adult male and a number of females and 36% contain more than one adult male. The remaining gorillas are either lone males or exclusively male groups, usually made up of one mature male and a few younger males. Group sizes vary from five to thirty, with an average of ten individuals. A typical group contains one dominant silverback, who is the group's undisputed leader; another subordinate silverback (usually a younger brother, half-brother, or even an adult son of the dominant silverback); one or two blackbacks, who act as sentries; three to four sexually mature females, who have bonded for life to the dominant silverback; and from three to six juveniles and infants.

Most males and approximately 60% of females leave their natal group. Males leave when they are about eleven years old, and often the separation process is slow: they spend more and more time on the edge of the group until they leave altogether. They may travel alone or with an all-male group for two to five years before they can attract females to join them and form a new group. Females typically emigrate when they are about eight years old, either transferring directly to an established group or beginning a new one with a lone male. Females often transfer to a new group several times before they choose to settle down with a certain silverback male.

The dominant silverback generally determines the movements of the group, leading it to appropriate feeding sites throughout the year. He also mediates conflicts within the group and protects it from external threats. When the group is attacked by humans, leopards, or other gorillas, the silverback will protect them, even at the cost of his own life. He is the center of attention during rest sessions, and young gorillas frequently stay close to him and include him in their games. If a mother dies or leaves the group, the silverback is usually the one who looks after her abandoned offspring, even allowing them to sleep in his nest. Young mountain gorillas have been observed searching for and dismantling poachers' snares.

When the silverback dies or is killed by disease, accident, or poachers, the family group may be disrupted. Unless there is an accepted male descendant capable of taking over his position, the group will either split up or adopt an unrelated male. When a new silverback joins the family group, he may kill all of the infants of the dead silverback. Infanticide has not been observed in stable groups.

Analysis of mountain gorilla genomes by whole genome sequencing indicates that a recent decline in their population size has led to extensive inbreeding. As an apparent result, individuals are typically homozygous for 34% of their genome sequence. Furthermore, homozygosity and the expression of deleterious recessive mutations as consequences of inbreeding have likely resulted in the purging of severely deleterious mutations from the population.

=== Aggression ===
Although strong and powerful, mountain gorillas are generally gentle and very shy. Severe aggression is rare in stable groups, but when two mountain gorilla groups meet, sometimes the two silverbacks can engage in a fight to the death, using their canines to cause deep, gaping injuries. Conflicts are most often resolved by displays and other threat behaviors that are intended to intimidate without becoming physical.

A ritualized charge display is unique to gorillas. The entire sequence has nine steps: (1) progressively quickening hooting, (2) symbolic feeding, (3) rising bipedally, (4) throwing vegetation, (5) chest-beating with cupped hands, (6) one leg kick, (7) sideways running four-legged, (8) slapping and tearing vegetation, and (9) thumping the ground with palms. Jill Donisthorpe has stated that a male charged at her twice. In both cases, the gorilla turned away when she stood her ground.

=== Affiliation ===
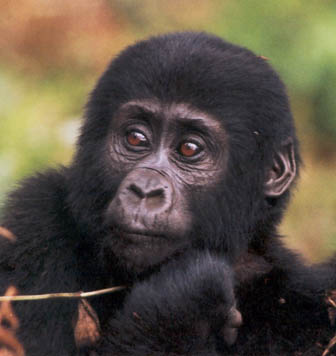
Young gorilla, two-three years old

The midday rest period is an important time for establishing and reinforcing relationships within the group. Mutual grooming reinforces social bonds, and helps keep hair free from dirt and parasites. It is not so common among gorillas as in other primates, although females groom their offspring regularly.

Young gorillas play often and are more arboreal than the large adults. Playing helps them learn how to communicate and behave within the group. Activities include wrestling, chasing, and somersaults. The silverback and his females tolerate and, if encouraged, even participate.

=== Vocalization ===
Twenty-five distinct vocalizations are recognized, many of which are used primarily for group communication within dense vegetation. Sounds classified as grunts and barks are heard most frequently while traveling, and indicate the whereabouts of individual group members. They also may be used during social interactions when discipline is required. Screams and roars signal alarm or warning, and are produced most often by silverbacks. Deep, rumbling belches suggest contentment and are heard frequently during feeding and resting periods. They are the most common form of intragroup communication.

=== Aversions ===
Mountain gorillas generally demonstrate aversion to certain reptiles and insects. Infants, whose typical behavior is to chase anything that moves, will go out of their way to avoid chameleons and caterpillars. The gorillas also demonstrate an aversion to water bodies in the environment and will cross streams only if they can do so without getting wet, such as by using fallen logs to cross the stream. They also dislike rain.

== Research ==
In October 1902, Captain Robert von Beringe (1865–1940) shot two large apes during an expedition to establish the boundaries of German East Africa. One of the apes was recovered and sent to the Berlin Zoological Museum, where Professor Paul Matschie (1861–1926) classified the animal as a new form of gorilla and named it Gorilla beringei after the man who shot it. In 1925, Carl Akeley, a hunter from the American Museum of Natural History who wished to study the gorillas, convinced Albert I of Belgium to establish the Albert National Park to protect the animals of the Virunga mountains.

George Schaller began his 20-month observation of the mountain gorillas in 1959, subsequently publishing two books: The Mountain Gorilla and The Year of the Gorilla. Little was known about the life of the mountain gorilla before his research, which described its social organization, life history, and ecology.

Dian Fossey began what would become an 18-year study in 1967. Fossey made new observations, completed the first accurate census, and established active conservation practices, such as anti-poaching patrols. The Digit Fund, which Fossey started, continued her work and was later renamed the Dian Fossey Gorilla Fund International. The Fund's Karisoke Research Center monitors and protects the mountain gorillas of the Virungas. Close monitoring and research of the Bwindi mountain gorillas began in the 1990s.

== Conservation ==
As of 2018, the mountain gorilla was listed as endangered on the IUCN Red List. Conservation efforts have led to an increase in the overall population of the mountain gorilla (Gorilla beringei beringei) in the Virungas and at Bwindi. The overall population is now believed to be at more than 1,000 individuals.

In December 2010, the official website of Virunga National Park announced that "the number of mountain gorillas living in the tri-national forested area of which Virunga forms a part, has increased by 26.3% during the last seven years - an average growth rate of 3.7% per annum." The 2010 census estimated that 480 mountain gorillas inhabited the region. The 2003 census had estimated the Virunga gorilla population to be 380 individuals, which represented a 17% increase in the total population since 1989, when there were 320 individuals. The population has almost doubled since its lowest point in 1981, when a census estimated that only 254 gorillas remained.

The 2006 census at Bwindi indicated a population of 340 gorillas, representing a 6% increase in total population size since 2002 and a 12% increase from 320 individuals in 1997. All of those estimates were based on traditional census methods using dung samples collected at night nests. Conversely, genetic analyses of the entire population during the 2006 census indicated there only were approximately 300 individuals in Bwindi. The discrepancy highlights the difficulty in using imprecise census data to estimate population growth.

According to computer modeling of their population dynamics in both Bwindi and the Virungas, groups of gorillas who were habituated for research and ecotourism have higher growth rates than unhabituated gorillas. Habituation means that through repeated, neutral contact with humans, gorillas exhibit normal behavior when people are in proximity. Habituated gorillas are more closely guarded by field staff and they receive veterinary treatment for snares, respiratory disease, and other life-threatening conditions. Nonetheless, researchers recommended that some gorillas remain unhabituated as a bet-hedging strategy against the risk of human pathogens being transmitted throughout the population. The main international non-governmental organization involved in conservation of mountain gorillas is the International Gorilla Conservation Programme, which was established in 1991 as a joint effort of the African Wildlife Foundation, Fauna & Flora International, and the World Wide Fund for Nature. Conservation requires work at many levels, from local to international, and involves protection and law enforcement as well as research and education.

Dian Fossey broke down conservation efforts into the following three categories:

- Active conservation includes frequent patrols in wildlife areas to destroy poacher equipment and weapons, firm and prompt law enforcement, census counts in regions of breeding and ranging concentration, and strong safeguards for the limited habitat the animals occupy.
- Theoretical conservation seeks to encourage growth in tourism by improving existing roads that circle the mountains, by renovating the park headquarters and tourist lodging, and by the habituation of gorillas near the park boundaries for tourists to visit and photograph.
- Community-based conservation management involves biodiversity protection by, for, and with the local community.

Contemporary threats to mountain gorillas and relevant conservation strategies
Threat	Effect on Gorilla Population	Conservation Efforts
Poaching	Gorillas are maimed or killed by traps set for other animals; Abduction of infants for illegal selling to zoos and as pets often results in other adult gorillas being killed in the process	Increased patrolling using armed guards in protected forest areas; Karisoke's guards find and remove approximately 1,000 snares each year; Gorilla censuses to monitor gorilla population; Karisoke Research Centre runs a facility for young gorillas rescued from poachers
Habitat loss	Rapidly expanding human settlements are removing the gorilla habitat; Fragmentation of forested areas has resulted in the isolation of gorilla groups from each other, reducing genetic diversity	Expansion of areas of national park to protect habitat
Disease	Regular contact of tourists with the gorillas allows transmission of diseases from humans to the gorillas; Domestic animals and livestock also contribute to disease transmission	Requirement to stay at least seven metres (23 ft) from gorillas at all times; Better management of ecotourism; More education for local communities to minimise impact of livestock
War and unrest	Refugees removing trees to create settlements and farms; Increased use of gorillas for meat by displaced peoples; Gorillas may be killed by land mines placed along forest paths	
Local communities	Habitat removal; Lack of support for conservation efforts due to insufficient education and awareness amongst locals; Poverty encourages the use of slash-and-burn agriculture to grow food	Karisoke Research centre has: Created Virunga biodiversity inventory and field guides, to support public education and ecotourism; Supplied primary school students with books and other materials; Run conservation programs for secondary schools; Provided biodiversity training for local park staff and conservation groups; Provided field courses and internships for Rwandan college students

A collaborative management process has had some success in the Bwindi Impenetrable National Park. The forest was designated a national park in 1991; this occurred with little community consultation and the new status prohibited local people from accessing resources within the park as well as reducing economic opportunities. Subsequently, a number of forest fires were deliberately lit and threats were made to the gorillas. To counteract this, three schemes to provide benefits from the existence of forest communities and involving the local community in park management were developed. They included agreements allowing the controlled harvesting of resources in the park, receipt of some revenue from tourism, and establishment of a trust fund partly for community development. Tension between people and the park has thus been reduced and now there is more willingness to take part in gorilla protection. Surveys of community attitudes conducted by CARE show a steadily increasing proportion of people in favour of the park. Moreover, there have been no cases of deliberate burning and the problem of snares in these areas has been reduced.

While community-based conservation bears out individual analysis, there are significant overlaps between active and theoretical conservation and a discussion of the two as halves of a whole seems more constructive. For example, in 2002, Rwanda's national parks went through a restructuring process. The director of the IGCP, Eugène Rutagarama, stated that "They got more rangers on better salaries, more radios, more patrol cars and better training in wildlife conservation. They also built more shelters in the park, from which rangers could protect the gorillas". The funding for these types of improvements usually comes from tourism - in 2008, approximately 20,000 tourists visited gorilla populations in Rwanda, generating around $8 million in revenue for the parks.

According to the Director of UNESCO, Audrey Azoulay, "As we have seen in Rwanda, species conservation succeeds when local communities are placed at the heart of the conservation strategy. Biodiversity protection measures must go hand in hand with measures that meet the needs of these local communities". In Rwanda, it costs $1,500 per person to come and see the gorillas. Under Rwandan law, 10% of this revenue must be returned to the community, which represents around €10 million invested in building schools, roads and drinking water supplies. As Audrey Azoulay explains, in 1980 there were just 250 mountain gorillas, as of 2025, there are 1,063 – and 80% of them in the Virunga Mountains of the DRC, Rwanda and Uganda.

In Uganda too, tourism is seen as a "high value activity that generates enough revenue to cover park management costs and contribute to the national budget of the Uganda Wildlife Authority." Furthermore, tourist visits which are conducted by park rangers also allow censuses of gorilla sub-populations to be undertaken concurrently.

In addition to tourism, other measures for conservation of the sub-population can be taken such as ensuring connecting corridors between isolated areas to make movement between them easier and safer.

== Threats ==
The mountain gorilla is threatened by habitat loss and poaching.

=== Habitat loss ===
Loss of habitat is one of the most severe threats to gorilla populations. The forests where mountain gorillas live are surrounded by rapidly increasing human settlement. Through shifting (slash-and-burn) agriculture, pastoral expansion, and logging, villages in forest zones cause fragmentation and degradation of habitat. The late 1960s saw the Virunga Conservation Area (VCA) of Rwanda's national park reduced by more than half of its original size to support the cultivation of Pyrethrum. This led to a massive reduction in mountain gorilla population numbers by the mid-1970s. The resulting deforestation confines the gorillas to isolated deserts. Some groups may raid crops for food, creating further animosity and retaliation. The impact of habitat loss extends beyond the reduction of suitable living space for gorillas. As gorilla groups are increasingly isolated from one another geographically due to human settlements, the genetic diversity of each group is reduced. Some signs of inbreeding are already appearing in younger gorillas, including webbed hands and feet.

=== Poaching ===
Mountain gorillas are not usually hunted for bushmeat, but frequently, they are maimed or killed by traps and snares intended for other animals. They have been killed for their heads, hands, and feet, which are sold to collectors. Infants are sold to zoos, researchers, and people who want them as pets. The abduction of infants generally involves the loss of at least one adult, as members of a group will fight to the death to protect their young. The Virunga gorillas are particularly susceptible to animal trafficking for the illegal pet trade. With young gorillas worth from $1,000 to $5,000 on the black market, poachers seeking infant and juvenile specimens will kill and wound other members of the group in the process. Those of the group that survive often disband. One well-documented case is known as the "Taiping 4". In this situation, a Malaysian Zoo received four wild-born infant gorillas from Nigeria at a cost of US$1.6 million using falsified export documents. Poaching for meat also is particularly threatening in regions of political unrest. Most of the African great apes survive in areas of chronic insecurity, where there is a breakdown of law and order. The killing of mountain gorillas at Bikenge in Virunga National Park in January 2007 was a well-documented case.

=== Disease ===
Despite the protection garnered from being located in national parks, the mountain gorilla is also at risk from people of a more well-meaning nature. Groups subjected to regular visits from tourists and locals are at a continued risk of disease cross-transmission (Lilly et al., 2002) – this is in spite of attempts to enforce a rule that humans and gorillas be separated by a distance of seven metres at all times to prevent this.

With a similar genetic makeup to humans and an immune system that has not evolved to cope with human disease, this poses a serious conservation threat. Indeed, according to some researchers, infectious diseases (predominantly respiratory) are responsible for approximately 20% of sudden deaths in mountain gorilla populations.

With the implementation of a successful ecotourism program in which human-gorilla interaction was minimised, during the period of 1989–2000 four sub-populations in Rwanda experienced an increase of 76%. By contrast, seven of the commonly visited sub-populations in the Democratic Republic of Congo (DRC) saw a decline of almost 20% over only four years (1996–2000).

The risk of disease transmission is not limited to those of a human origin; pathogens from domestic animals and livestock through contaminated water are also a concern. Studies have found that waterborne, gastrointestinal parasites such as Cryptosporidium sp., Microsporidia sp., and Giardia sp. are genetically identical when found in livestock, humans, and gorillas, particularly along the border of the Bwindi Impenetrable Forest, Uganda.

=== War and civil unrest ===
Rwanda, Uganda, and the Democratic Republic of Congo have been politically unstable and beleaguered by war and civil unrest during the last decades. Using simulation modeling, Byers et al. (2003) have suggested that times of war and unrest have negative impacts on the habitat and populations of mountain gorillas. Due to the increase in human encounters, both aggressive and passive, this has resulted in a rise in mortality rates and a decrease in reproductive success.

More direct impacts from conflict can also be seen. Kanyamibwa notes that there were reports that mines were placed along trails in the Volcanoes National Park, and that many gorillas were killed as a result. Pressure from habitat destruction in the form of logging also increased as refugees fled the cities and cut down trees for wood. During the Rwandan genocide, some poaching activity also was linked to the general breakdown of law and order and lack of any ramifications.

== See also ==
- Sumatran orangutan
- Titus (gorilla)

== Other sources ==
- African Wildlife Foundation, awf.org
- Adams, D.; Carwardine, M. (1991). Last Chance to See. London: Pan Books. ISBN 0-330-32002-5.
- Groves, C. (2001). Primate Taxonomy. Smithsonian. ISBN 1-56098-872-X.
- Harcourt, A. H. (1979). "Social relationships among adult female mountain gorillas". Animal Behaviour. 27 (1): 251–264. doi:10.1016/0003-3472(79)90145-3. S2CID 53159816.
