= Yepes (surname) =

Yepes is a surname. Notable people with the name include:

- Gerard Yepes (born 2002), Spanish footballer
- Linda Yepes (born c. 1988), Colombian television presenter
- Mario Yepes (born 1976), Colombian footballer
- Narciso Yepes (1927–1997), Spanish guitarist
- Tomás de Yepes (c. 1595–1674), Spanish painter
- Juan de Yepes y Álvarez (1542–1591), birth name of John of the Cross, Spanish mystic, Catholic saint, Carmelite friar and priest

== See also ==
- Yepes, Spanish town
- Yepez
