= Cortesi =

Cortesi may refer to:

== People ==
- Antonio Cortesi (1796 – 1879), Italian ballet dancer, choreographer, and composer
- Celeste Cortesi, a model from the Philippines who won Miss Earth 2018
- Chiara Simoneschi-Cortesi (born 1946), Swiss politician and member of the Christian Democratic People's Party
- Fabrizio Cortesi (1879-1949), Italian botanist
- Filippo Cortesi, Roman Catholic Apostolic Nuncio to Poland from 24 December 1936 to 1 February 1947
- Giovanna Cortesi Marmocchini (1666-1731), Italian artist
- Ilario Cortesi, C.R. (1545–1608), Italian Roman Catholic Bishop of Policastro
- Natascia Leonardi Cortesi (born 1971), Swiss cross-country skier and ski mountaineer
- Tiberio Cortesi (died 1602), Italian Roman Catholic Bishop of Lavello

== Other ==
- 91428 Cortesi

== See also ==
- Cortese, a surname
- Corydoras cortesi, a tropical freshwater fish belonging to the subfamily Corydoradinae of the family Callichthyidae found in Colombia
- San Giacomo e Filippo, Corte de' Cortesi, Roman Catholic church in Neoclassical-style, located in the province of Cremona
