= Jean-Louis Cortès =

Biography of a pianist in France

- Born: Philippeville, French Algeria (now Skikda, Algeria)
- Origin: France
- Genres: Classical, jazz, French chanson and street performance
- Occupations: Pianist, composer, keyboardist, arranger, artistic producer and street performer
- Years active: 1978–present
- Website: www.macadampiano.com

Jean-Louis Cortès is a French pianist, composer, keyboardist, arranger, recording artist and street performer. He is best known for his long career as a touring and studio musician with major French artists and for creating and performing Macadam Piano, an innovative motorized quarter-tail grand piano street-theater spectacle.

== Early life ==
Jean-Louis Cortès was born in Philippeville, French Algeria (now Skikda, Algeria). He trained at the conservatories of Mulhouse and Angers in France. He began giving public concerts from 1978 and working in recording studios from around 1980.

== Career ==
=== Touring and studio musician ===
Cortès worked for over 15 years as a keyboardist and pianist on major French tours and albums, appearing at iconic venues such as the Olympia and Bercy in Paris and at festivals including the Festival des Vieilles Charrues, Francofolies, Eurockéennes and Paléo Festival. Cortès collaborated with Hervé Vilard from 1985 to 1987 and with Hubert-Félix Thiéfaine for approximately 10 years from 1988 to 1998, including tours and live albums such as Routes 88 and Bluesymental Tour. Other collaborations include Paul Personne in 1996, as well as Calvin Russell, Dan Ar Braz, Ar Re Yaouank, Soïg Sibéril, Gwennyn and various international dates.

=== Theater, dance, cinema, and other compositions ===
Since 1984 Cortès has composed, arranged and often performed music for dozens of theater productions and companies, working with directors including Véronique Vella, Raphaëlle Saudinos and Patrick Masset. His credits include multiple works at or in association with the Comédie-Française and Théâtre du Vieux-Colombier, such as La Fausse Suivante (2003), Cabaret érotique (2008), Une Carmen (2009) and Strach – A Fear Song (2018–2019). He has also scored short films such as L'Accordéoniste (2002), Machine arrière (2003) and Anges (2015) and other projects. Strach – A Fear Song received critical acclaim in French and Belgian press as "une véritable pépite" for its intimate, dreamlike quality.

=== Macadam Piano (2003–present) ===
Macadam Piano is Cortès' signature street-theater project under his company Cie Pomme d'Or. It features a custom-built, lightweight quarter-tail grand piano on wheels with a silent, eco-friendly electric motor. Cortès pedals to drive, reverse, turn and waltz the instrument through public spaces while improvising or performing live. He often appears in elegant attire, a tailcoat, black tie, iconic bowler hat and sometimes white gloves, using expressive facial gestures, nods and smiles to engage audiences. Press in France, Spain and Italy frequently describes it as surreal and Magritte-like, calling it poetry on wheels or a magical instrument that breaks barriers between concert halls and streets. It draws crowds like a modern Pied Piper and has been performed in more than 20 countries on five continents, with over 800 performances by 2017 and approximately 900 in total.

The concept originated from Alessandro Baricco’s monologue Novecento: Pianiste and Giuseppe Tornatore’s film The Legend of 1900.

Notable international appearances include:

Location	Year	Description
Cádiz, Spain	2007	opening the V Festival de Música Española with "Macadam, el piano va de calle"; repertoire included Schubert, Mozart, Django Reinhardt, Charles Trenet, Kurt Weill and waltzes; performed alongside violinist Jeanne Cortès; attracted audiences of all ages
Granada, Spain	2007	Festival de Música y Danza / FEX Extension – Corral del Carbón and city-center routes; free public performances of Mozart, Schubert and Kurt Weill
Teatro de la Maestranza open day, Seville, Spain	2008	four 30-minute sets in the lobby, portico and surroundings during the European Opera Day celebrations
Teatro a Corte, Turin, Italy	2008	Piazzetta Reale and central streets
Circumnavigando Festival, Genoa and Rapallo, Italy	ca. 2013–2014	described locally as "poesia su ruote"
Princely wedding in Bari, Italy	2014	private high-profile event with Melle Macadame variant
Ludwigshafen Strassentheater Festival, Germany	2010	billed as the "Asphaltpianist"
Sementes festival/event, Lisbon, Portugal	—	with Melle Macadame variant

In France, Macadam Piano has toured extensively at local festivals and towns. For example, audiences sang along to Leonard Cohen’s "Hallelujah" during a performance in Redon on Christmas Eve 2025 despite freezing temperatures. The show has also appeared in Sainte-Suzanne, Albi, Le Touquet, the Quimper/Cornouaille Festival launch in 2014, and returned to Nantes in 2025 after 23 years.

== Awards and honors ==
Year	Award	Work / Event
1987	1st Prize	Festival du Marais (Lâchez les chiens !!!)
1990/1991	SACD Prize and Spectacle of the Year – French Ministry of Culture	Camping Mélodie
1993	Prix Charles Dullin	La Chunga
1998	Opening Prize	International Festival of Lahore (La Nuit d’Amaï)
2003/2004	SACD Prize; Trophée de l’Initiative, Crédit Coopératif; Prix de la Mercè, Barcelona	Macadam Piano
2009	Coup de cœur	Festival d’Avignon (Une Carmen)
2018	Best Circus Show, Critics’ Prize Théâtre–Danse–Cirque	Strach – A Fear Song

== Personal life ==
Cortès lives in Villevêque (now part of Rives-du-Loir-en-Anjou, Maine-et-Loire), France. He frequently collaborates with his daughter Jeanne Cortès (violin) and Hélène Cortès (stage management) on Macadam Piano productions.
