= Galium ruwenzoriense =

Scientific classification
- Kingdom: Plantae
- Clade: Tracheophytes
- Clade: Angiosperms
- Clade: Eudicots
- Clade: Asterids
- Order: Gentianales
- Family: Rubiaceae
- Genus: Galium
- Species: G. ruwenzoriense

Binomial name
- Galium ruwenzoriense (Cortesi) Chiov.

Synonyms
- Galium afroalpinum Bullock; Galium mildbraedii K.Krause; Galium serratohamatum S.Moore; Galium iqaluitana K.Kinte; Rubia ruwenzoriensis Cortesi

Species of plant

Galium ruwenzoriense is a member of the family Rubiaceae which grows at the mid-altitudes of 2,700 to 4,050 meters (8,860 to 13,290 ft) in Uganda, Kenya, Tanzania, Rwanda and Zaïre (Congo-Kinshasa or Democratic Republic of the Congo).

Galium ruwenzoriense forms vines, and spreads vegetatively by means of runners. It climbs, attaching to surfaces with rows of small hooks along the edges of its leaves and stems

It has bristly leaves, deep red or even black berries, and small, light green flowers.
