= Titus (gorilla) =

Silverback mountain gorilla of the Virunga Mountains

- Species: Mountain gorilla
- Sex: Male
- Born: 24 August 1974
- Died: 14 September 2009 (aged 35)
- Parents: Uncle Bert (Father); Aunt Flossie (Mother)
- Offspring: Kuryama; Rano
- Named after: Titus Groan

Titus (24 August 1974 – 14 September 2009) was a silverback mountain gorilla of the Virunga Mountains, observed by researchers almost continuously over his entire life. He was the subject of the 2008 PBS Nature/BBC Natural World documentary film Titus: The Gorilla King.

== Biography ==
Titus was born on 24 August 1974. He was named by gorilla researcher Kelly Stewert, who was observing his group at the time, after the eponymous protagonist of the Mervyn Peake novel Titus Groan.

When Titus was four years old a blackback male joined his troop. He was named Beetsme by Dian Fossey when she was asked by a visiting friend who he was and replied "Beats me". Shortly afterwards Titus' father and dominant silverback Uncle Bert (named for Diane's uncle) was killed by poachers. Beetsme attempted to take control of the troop, killing the infant daughter of its dominant female Aunt Flossie. However the blackback was rejected and the females left.

Titus and Beetsme, who seemed to have formed a bond, then became the nucleus of an unstable bachelor group. The troop was without females for eight years, during which time they were observed engaging in homosexual behaviour. When five females did eventually join the troop, Beetsme—now a fully-grown silverback—drove off the other males except Titus and became its dominant male. Titus, still a blackback, remained subordinate to Beetsme for six years. However, during this time he mated covertly with the troop's females. DNA analysis shows he sired his first offspring, Kuryama, by the group's dominant female Papoose in 1985 – the youngest recorded siring by a gorilla. In 1991, now matured to a silverback, Titus began asserting his dominance over the other males in the troop and a year later, aged 18, he displaced Beetsme as the dominant male. Beetsme remained in the troop as Titus' subordinate until his death in 2001.

Titus sired more children than any other gorilla on record and by 2004 controlled the largest known gorilla troop in the world. By age thirty, however, his dominance was waning and he began regularly fighting with his silverback son Kuryama. He was also observed biting a female after she was caught mating with Kuryama in secret. This was noted by researchers as being at odds with Titus' "calm" leadership style in previous years. In the spring of 2007 Titus led his troop to the peak of a volcanic mountain. The low temperature at that altitude threatened the younger members of the group and as Titus lingered there Kuryama made a bid for dominance. He successfully displaced Titus and then led the majority of the troop, including most of the sexually mature females and their offspring, away from the mountain. Titus did not resist but was not willing to give up his dominant position and so the troop was split. Some of the older females, including the dominant female Tuck, and their infants remained with Titus, as did a young silverback named Tuyizere.

In August 2009 a new challenger emerged, when Titus' 17-year-old son Rano, who had not been seen for two years, returned to the group. Stressed by Rano's presence Titus and his followers fled in an attempt to throw Rano off. Weakened by the lack of rest, and from an infected wound caused by an early encounter with Rano, Titus soon started to show signs of illness. After more than 10 days the group finally settled down, with Rano among them. But Titus was exhausted and very ill. On 14 September 2009, he died at age 35.

== See also ==
- List of individual apes
