= Róger Cortés =

Association footballer (born 2000)

Personal information
- Full name: Roger Daniel Cortés Guevara
- Date of birth: 23 October 2000 (age 26)
- Place of birth: San José, Costa Rica
- Position: Midfielder

Team information
- Current team: Pitbulls FC

Youth career
- UCR

Senior career*
Years	Team	Apps	(Gls)
2018	UCR	3	(0)
2020	Municipal Grecia	2	(0)
2021	Aserrí	5	(0)
2022–2023	AD Sarchí	16	(0)
2023–2024	Carmelita		
2024–2025	Guadalupe		
2025–	Pitbulls FC		
- * Club domestic league appearances and goals as of 16:30, 23 June 2024 (UTC)

Roger Daniel Cortés Guevara (born 23 October 2000) is a Costa Rican footballer who plays as a midfielder for Costa Rican club Pitbulls FC.

== Career ==
=== Club career ===
Cortés is a product of UCR and got his professional debut for the club on 15 April 2018 against Alajuelense in the Liga FPD. This was his first and last game in the 2017–18 season. In the following season, he made two official appearances before leaving the club at the end of 2018.

On 2 January 2020, Cortés joined Municipal Grecia. His contract was extended in July 2020 after one league appearance for the club.

In the summer 2021, Cortés moved to Aserrí FC.

In July 2025, Cortés joined Costa Rican club Pitbulls FC.
