= Santiago Cortés (musician) =

Latino-Swiss musician and composer

Santiago Cortés is a Latino-Swiss musician and composer. He has been producing music for TV and film, and doing regular DJ dance music gigs in the US, South America, Italy, Spain and Asia, since 1991.

During 1997–2000, Cortés completed his education as a sound engineer and founded his own SMP label in 2005. In producing his debut album, Welcome to My Airline, released in September 2005, he collaborated with musicians, engineers and producers in Europe and abroad, such as the lead singer Sonnie "Skip" Martin (Grammy winner, New York) from Kool & the Gang and "Tony Martinez and the Cuban Power" (two time Grammy nominee, New York).

For his second album, First Class, he worked with various artists in the genre of house music, including Kim Cooper (Defected Records), Lynn Lockamy and Phil Dankner.

Cortés had a Number 1 hit single and music video in early 2005 with "Don't Leave Me". It was accepted for N1 rotation on Viva Switzerland and on Latin-MTV in Miami, and made the Swiss Top 40 within one week of airplay. His second single, "Superstar", released in September 2005, also made the Swiss Top 40 within one week. Late in January 2006, his third single, "Saturday", was released in combination with a new music video. "Crazy" also reached Number 1. Cortés then began working on his third album, In the Mix.

Cortés has an international network which allows him to work on an international level, based on a wide repertoire of artists. He joined Radio 105, the leading Swiss youth radio, to produce his own radio show every Friday evening. He is the first Swiss musician to have his own platform in SecondLife.com. His club, "First Class", is frequently visited.

Besides his production activities, Cortés still enjoys bookings as a DJ — such as Resident DJ at “White Nights” at Club Amnesia Ibiza, at Kaufleuten Zürich (CH), or 90° Berlin (D) — which keeps him close to developments in dance and house music.

== Discography ==
=== Singles ===
- "Don't Leave Me" (2005)
- "Superstar" (with Wonderland) (2005)
- "Superstupide"

=== Albums ===
- Welcome To My Airline (2005)
