= Domenico Tarcisio Cortese =

Italian Roman Catholic bishop

Domenico Tarcisio Cortese O.F.M.
- Bishop of Mileto-Nicotera-Tropea
- Church: Catholic Church
- Diocese: Diocese of Mileto-Nicotera-Tropea
- In office: 15 June 1979 – 28 June 2007
- Predecessor: Vincenzo De Chiara
- Successor: Luigi Renzo

Orders
- Ordination: 23 May 1954
- Consecration: 8 September 1979 by Aurelio Sorrentino

Personal details
- Born: 7 February 1931 San Giovanni in Fiore, Province of Cosenza, Kingdom of Italy
- Died: 11 November 2011 (aged 80)

Domenico Tarcisio Cortese (7 February 1931 – 11 November 2011) was the Catholic bishop of the Diocese of Mileto-Nicotera-Tropea, Italy.

Ordained in 1954, Corteso became a bishop in 1979, retiring in 2007.
