= Hilario Sánchez Cortés =

Mexican politician

- Born: 21 October 1957 (age 68); State of Mexico, Mexico
- Occupation: Politician
- Political party: PRD

Hilario Everardo Sánchez Cortés (born 21 October 1957) is a Mexican politician from the Party of the Democratic Revolution. In 2012 he served as Deputy of the LXI Legislature of the Mexican Congress representing the State of Mexico.
