= Hazardous Waste and Substances Sites List =

California planning document

The Hazardous Waste and Substances Sites List, also known as the Cortese List—named for Dominic Cortese—or California Superfund, is a planning document used by the State of California and its various local agencies and developers to comply with the California Environmental Quality Act requirements in providing information about the location of hazardous materials release sites. California Government Code section 65962.5 requires the California Environmental Protection Agency to develop at least an annually updated Cortese List.

The California Department of Toxic Substances Control (DTSC) is responsible for a portion of the information contained in the Cortese List. Other State and local government agencies are required to provide additional hazardous material release information for the Cortese List.

The list is maintained via DTSC's Brownfields and Environmental Restoration Program (Cleanup Program), called EnviroStor. The database currently contains 575 sites, including the Federal Superfund sites. It also maintains corrected and partially corrected sites, listed Certified with Operation and Maintenance sites.
