= Francofolies =

Francofolies or Les Francofolies may refer to:

- Les FrancoFolies de Montréal, a music festival in Montréal, Québec, Canada
- Les Francofolies de La Rochelle, a music festival in La Rochelle, France
- Les Francofolies de Spa, a music festival in Spa, Belgium
