= Aurelio Cortés =

Cuban baseball player (born 1904)

- Catcher / First baseman
- Born: 1904; Cienfuegos, Cuba
- Batted: Right Threw: Right

Negro league baseball debut
- 1928, for the Cuban Stars (West)

Last appearance
- 1935, for the Cuban Stars (East)
- Stats at Baseball Reference

Teams
- Cuban Stars (West) (1928–1930); Cuban Stars (East) (1935)

Aurelio Cortés (1904 – death unknown) was a Cuban professional baseball catcher and first baseman in the Negro leagues between 1928 and 1935.

A native of Cienfuegos, Cuba, Cortés made his Negro leagues debut in 1928 with the Cuban Stars (West). He played three seasons with the club, then finished his career in 1935 with the Cuban Stars (East).
