= Linda Yepes =

Colombian television presenter

- Born: Linda Yepes Agamez; 1987 or 1988 (age 36–37)

Linda Yepes Agamez (born 1987 or 1988) is a Colombian television presenter.

== Early life ==
Yepes was born in La Luz, a neighborhood of Barranquilla, the fourth of five children in her family.

== Career ==
Yepes joined Las Noticias, a weekday program on Telecaribe, in 2014, becoming the host of the beauty and health segment Los secretas de Linda. She was the second trans woman to become a Colombian television presenter after Michel Alexandro Valencia.
