= Bernardo Cortés =

Spanish writer, humorist, singer, and songwriter

Bernardo Cortés Maldonado (1934 - 3 March 2017) was a Spanish writer, humorist, singer and songwriter, better known as «El Poeta de la Barceloneta» ("Poet of La Barceloneta") or «Palomino».

Born in Jaén, he moved to Barcelona in 1952, and in the 1980s was introduced into the world of television by Valerio Lazarov. From there, he began to act in different programmes like "Gente divertida" ("Funny people"). Became a more popular caricature by Oriol Grau, like "Palomino", in the programme "Sense títol" of TV3 presented by Andreu Buenafuente.

Until the last years, Cortes dedicated himself to playing the guitar and singing among the diners of the terraces and restaurants of Barceloneta, where it had become an institution. He published several books: "Barceloneta de Barcelona", Materia y espíritu, Amanecer cantando and "Poemas de la Barceloneta". He also released several albums, such as "Marvellous Life" in 1999, where he sang a ranchera in which he paid homage to his mother and his wife, and "Always Young" in 2012, and participated in films such as Lola, by Bigas Luna.

He died on 3 March 2017 in Barcelona.
