= Luz Virginia Cortés =

Mexican politician

- Born: 21 May 1976 (age 50); Querétaro, Mexico
- Occupation: Politician
- Political party: PAN

Luz Virginia Cortés Osornio (born 21 May 1976) is a Mexican politician from the National Action Party. In 2009 she served as Deputy of the LX Legislature of the Mexican Congress representing Querétaro.
