= Yulenny Cortés León =

Mexican politician

- Born: 18 April 1976 (age 50); Colima, Mexico
- Occupation: Politician
- Political party: PAN

Yulenny Guylaine Cortés León (born 18 April 1976) is a Mexican politician from the National Action Party. From 2009 to 2012, she was a deputy in the LXI Legislature of the Mexican Congress, representing Colima.
