= Pamela Cortes =

Ecuadorian singer, actress and dancer

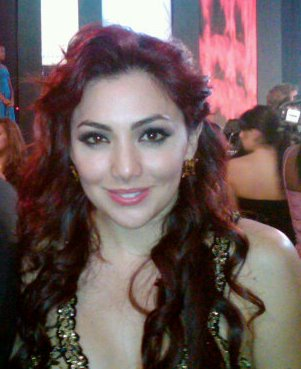

Background information
- Born: January 9, 1981 (age 44)
- Genres: Pop
- Years active: 1988–present

Pamela Cortes is an Ecuadorian singer, actress and dancer.

== Early life and education ==
Pamela Cortes was born on January 9, 1981, in Guayaquil, Ecuador. She started to study music and dancing when she was 7 years old. Since then, she has become a singer, actress, and dancer, who is well known in Ecuador. Cortes' entertainment career ambitions were supported by her family, which includes her mother, father and her two brothers.

== Career ==
Pamela Cortes has been an artist since she was young. She took music and dancing classes in Conservatory Antonio Neumane and Danzas Jazz Academy of Guayaquil. In 1992, she won first place in "Los niños cantan a America". Later, in 1993, she was elected as "La Paquita Ecuatoriana" (Xuxa Stage Assistants) which led her to create and host her own TV show called El Rincon de los bajitos. In 1994, she released her first album, Alegria, and participated in "Sabado Gigante", a singing contest in which she did not win.

Two years later, in 1996, she released her second album, Mas alla del sol, which brought her a lot of fame. In the same year, Cortes acted in Romeo and Juliet carried out by Ecuadorian productions. She also participated in "Teleton de Costa Rica" for collecting money for poor children. Afterwards, in 1999, she went to study Music Business in Miami and returned to Ecuador in 2000 to release her third album, Con el alma, which became well known in Ecuador, Panama, Costa Rica and Peru. In the same year, she acted in Besame Tonto, later in Mis primas, and finally in El hombre de la mancha. In 2004 she released her fourth album Esperare, and is currently working on her fifth. In 2007 she performed with Franco de Vita the song "Te Amo" during De Vita's concert in Coliseo Ruminahui. She is currently working in a TV varieties program and is married to David Harutyunyan, director of the symphonic orchestra of Guayaquil and musician. They have a son named Max.

=== Discography ===
==== Albums ====
- Alegría (1994)
- Más allá del sol (1996)
- Con el alma (2001)
- Esperaré (2004)
- Cristales Rotos (2011)

==== Singles ====
- La Mariposa y el Caracol
- Hoy es día de alegrí a (Hoje é dia de folia)
- Arco iris (Arco íris)
- Dicen
- Emergencia De Amor
- Exorcismo De Amor
- Te vas
- Lejos
- Olvídate De Mi
- Cristales Rotos

=== Awards ===
- La artista Revolucion
- Premio Huancavilca
- Disco Rojo
- Cantante del Año
- Estrella Dorada
- Antena Dorada
