= Cristoforo Cortese =

Venetian miniaturist (circa 1399–1445)

- Born: c. 1399; Venice
- Died: 1445

Cristoforo Cortese (c. 1399–1445) was a 15th-century Venetian miniaturist, illuminator, and head of the Veneto school of illumination; he was the first major artist in Venice to paint in the late Gothic style. Cortese is widely regarded as the most notable and prolific Venetian illuminator of the first half of the fifteenth century.

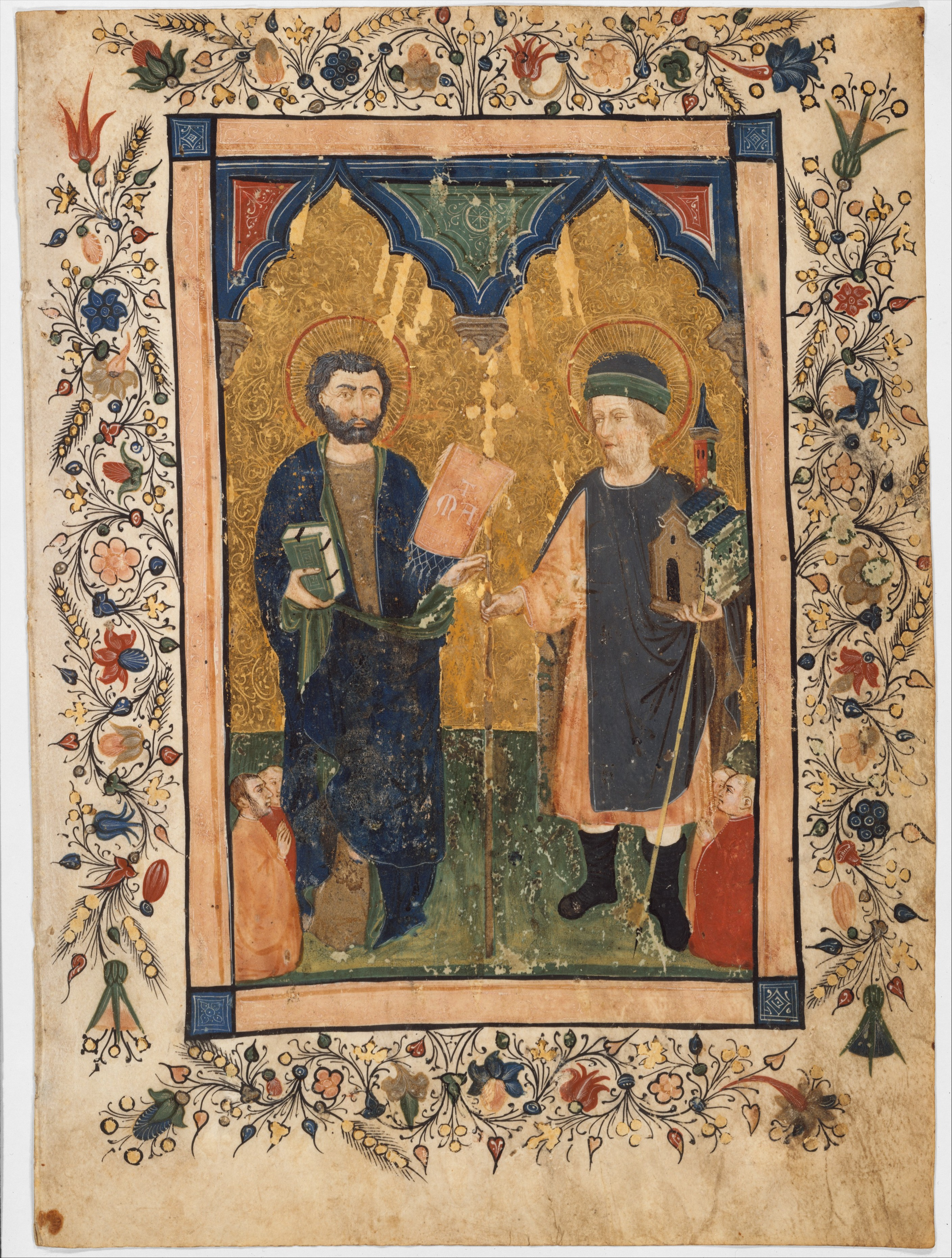
Leaf depicting Mark the Evangelist and Sinibaldus by Cortese

Throughout his career, Cortese produced a number of religious, secular, and classical texts. The only documented work by Cortese, however, is St Francis in Glory, an illuminated choir book depicting the death of St. Francis dating from the late 1420s.

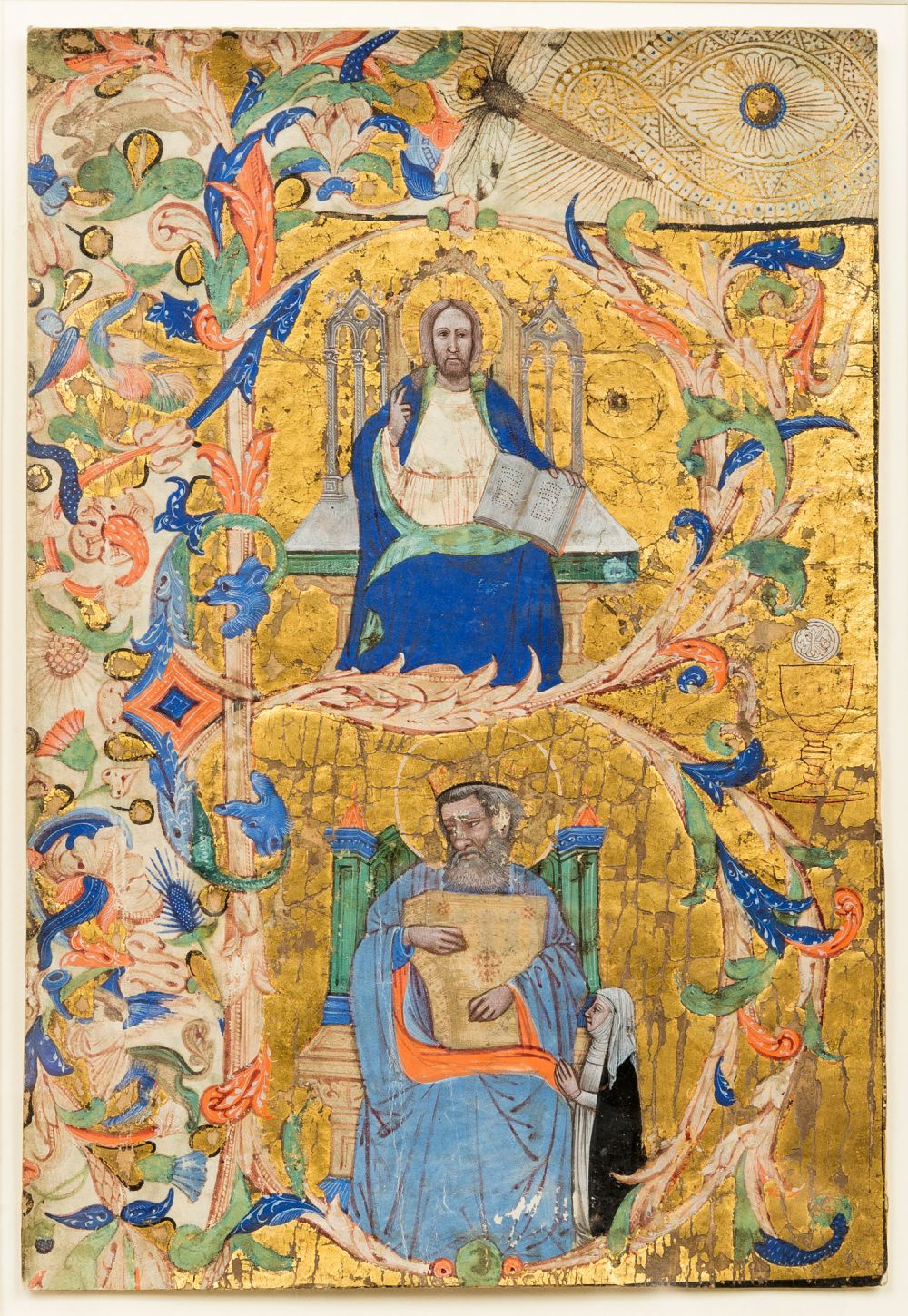
Christ Enthroned with David Playing a Psaltery by Cortese

The invention of girari is attributed to Cortese; girari being a method of ornamentation with white garlands.
