= Irene Cortes (artist) =

Filmmaker and artist

Irene Cortes (born 1979) is a filmmaker and artist.

== Biography ==
Irene was born in 1979.

She has been exhibiting artist and filmmaker for more than 18 years active filmmaker and has been making films for more than 18 years. Most of her work is related to tackling climate change and she calls her style of filmmaking "building film". Her films have been exhibited in Dieselverkstaden, Sweden; Platoon Kunsthalle, Berlin; RufXXX, Seoul; Spin Gallery, Toronto.

As an author, her books have been published in Asian countries.

== Work ==
- Nowhere Here Now
- The Gata: Water Ceremony
- Pussies in the Mist

== Awards and recognition ==
- For The Luminous Landscape (2019)
