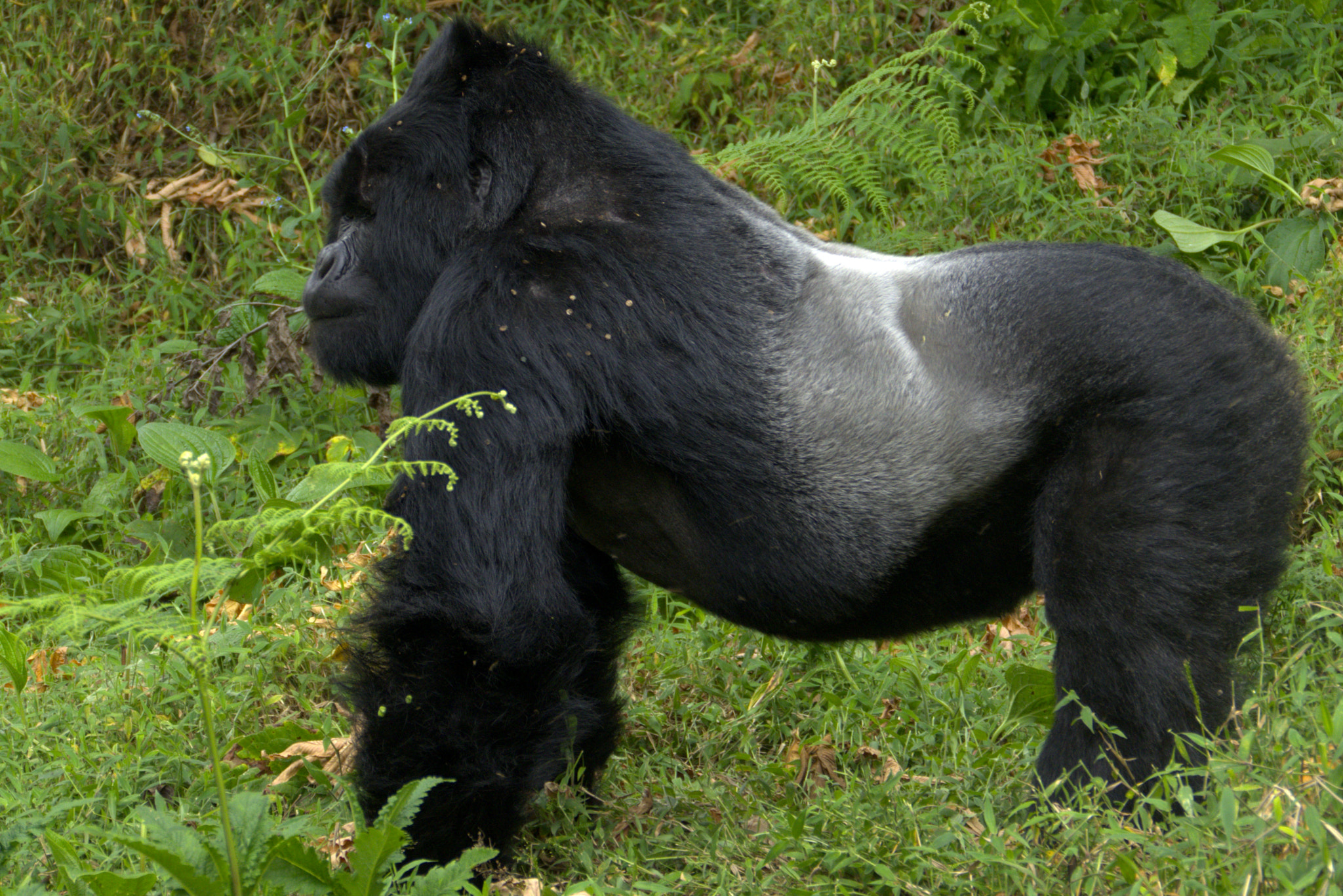
- Male
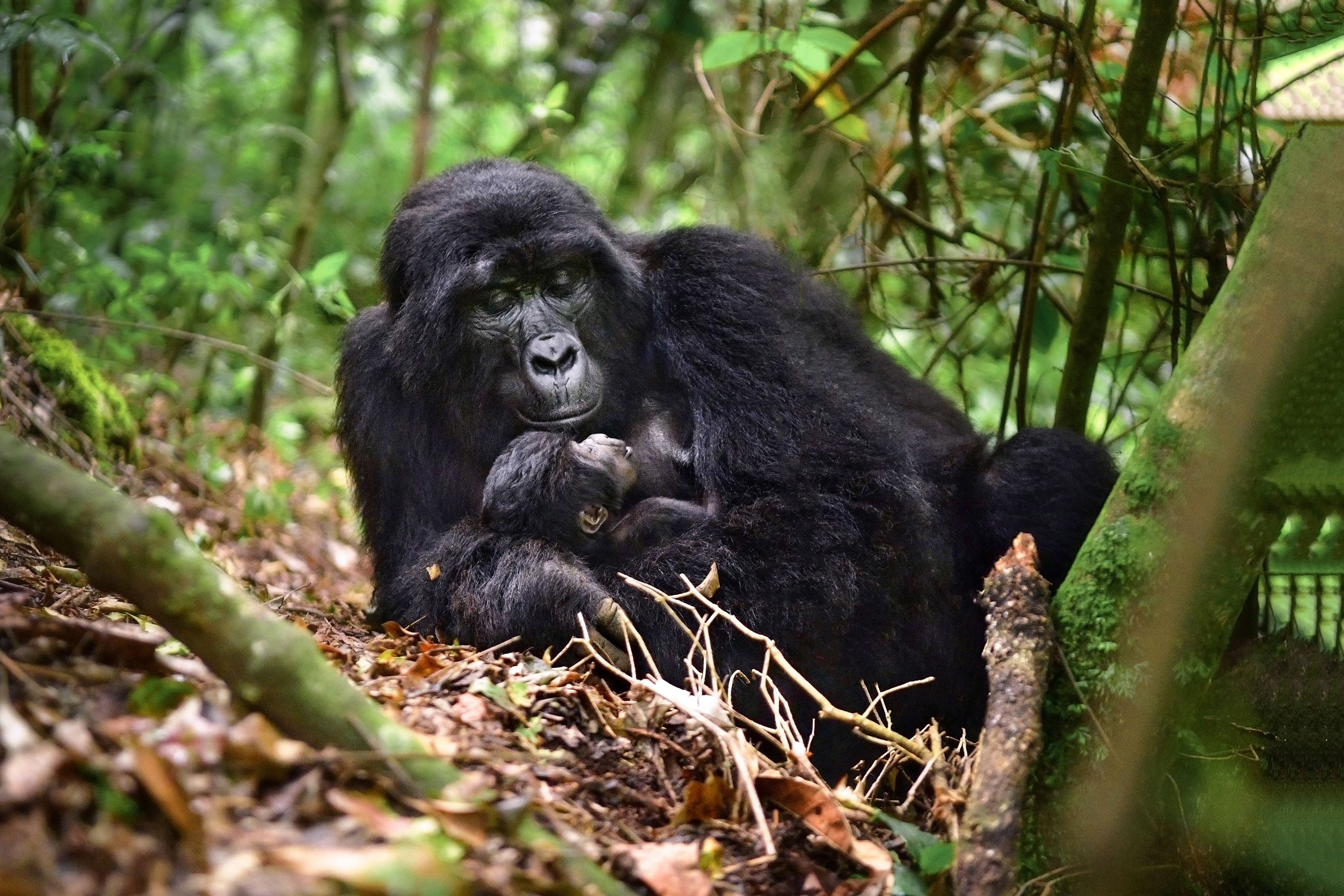
- Female with infant Both are mountain gorillas, photographed in Bwindi Impenetrable Forest

Conservation status
- Critically Endangered (IUCN 3.1)
- CITES Appendix I

Scientific classification
- Kingdom: Animalia
- Phylum: Chordata
- Class: Mammalia
- Infraclass: Placentalia
- Order: Primates
- Superfamily: Hominoidea
- Family: Hominidae
- Genus: Gorilla
- Species: G. beringei

Binomial name
- Gorilla beringei Matschie, 1903

Subspecies
- G. b. beringei G. b. graueri
- Eastern gorilla range Extant (resident) Possibly extant (resident)

= Eastern gorilla =

Eastern gorilla Temporal range: Pleistocene to recent

Species of ape

The eastern gorilla (Gorilla beringei) is a critically endangered species of the genus Gorilla and the largest living primate. At present, the species is subdivided into two subspecies. There are 6,800 eastern lowland gorillas or Grauer's gorillas (G. b. graueri) and 1,000 mountain gorillas (G. b. beringei). Illegal hunting threatens the species.

== Taxonomy and phylogeny ==
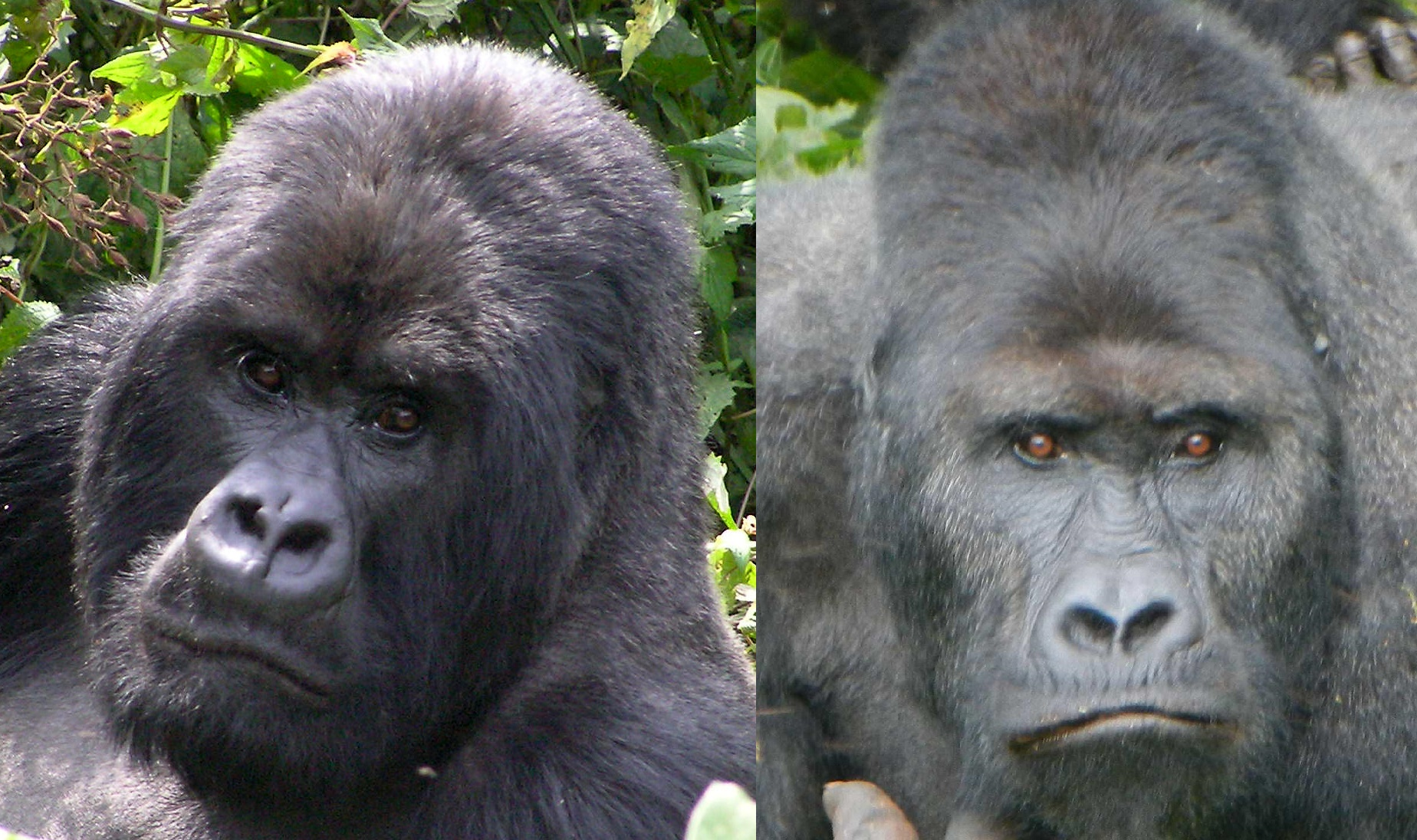
Mountain gorilla (left) and eastern lowland gorilla (right)

There are two recognised subspecies of eastern gorilla: the mountain gorilla (Gorilla beringei beringei) of the volcanic slopes of Rwanda, Uganda and eastern Democratic Republic of Congo; and the eastern lowland gorilla or Grauer's gorilla (Gorilla beringei graueri) in eastern Democratic Republic of Congo.

The eastern lowland gorillas and mountain gorillas were previously thought to be two of the three subspecies of one single species, the gorilla (Gorilla gorilla). However, genetic research has shown that the two eastern subspecies are far more closely related than the western subspecies: the western lowland gorilla (G. gorilla gorilla), which justified the separate classification. The two eastern subspecies are now classified as G. beringei.

== Description ==
The eastern gorilla is a large hominid with a large head, broad chest, and long arms. It has a flat nose with large nostrils. The face, hands, feet and breast are bald. The fur is mainly black, but adult males have a silvery "saddle" on their back. When the gorilla gets older, the hair on the saddle of the back becomes white, much like the gray hair of elderly people. This is why the older males are called silverbacks. Grauer's gorilla has a shorter, thicker, deep black fur, while the mountain gorilla has a more bluish color. The mountain gorilla is slightly smaller and lighter than Grauer's gorilla, but still larger and heavier than the western lowland gorilla and the Cross River gorilla. Males are much larger than females. A full-grown male eastern gorilla typically weighs 140–205.5 kg (309–453 lb) and stands 1.7 m (5.6 ft) upright and a female typically weighs 90–100 kg (200–220 lb) and stands 1.5 m (4.9 ft) tall. The tallest silverback recorded was a 1.95-metre (6.4 ft) individual shot in Alimbongo, northern Kivu in May 1938. The heaviest gorilla recorded was a 1.83-metre (6.0 ft) silverback shot in Ambam, Cameroon, which weighed 267 kilograms (589 lb), although the latter area is within the range of the western gorilla, far outside that of the eastern gorilla.

== Distribution and ecology ==
Mountain gorillas are restricted to the mountain rainforest and subalpine forest of eastern Democratic Republic of the Congo (DRC), southwestern Uganda and Rwanda. Grauer's gorilla occur across the forests of the Albertine Rift in eastern DRC.

Eastern gorillas are herbivorous, with a heavily foliage based diet, due to lack of available fruit in their habitats. They have smaller home ranges than western gorillas as foliage is more abundant than fruit. They are diurnal but the majority of foraging occurs in the morning and late afternoon. At night, they build nests by folding over vegetation, usually on the ground.

== Behavior ==
Eastern gorillas live in stable, cohesive family groups, led by a dominant silverback male. Eastern gorillas tend to have larger group sizes than their western relatives, numbering up to 35 individuals. There is no distinct breeding season and females give birth only once every 3–4 years due to the long period of parental care and a gestation period of 8.5 months. Newborn gorillas have greyish-pink skin and can crawl after 9 weeks; they are not fully weaned until 3.5 years. Males defend their females and offspring using their large size in intimidating displays involving charging and chest-beating.

== Conservation status ==
The eastern gorilla has become increasingly endangered since the 1990s, and the species was listed as critically endangered in September 2016 as its population continued to decrease. Primary threats to the eastern gorilla include habitat destruction for residential, commercial, and agricultural purposes, habitat fragmentation caused by transportation corridors and resource extraction, as well as disease. Between 1996 and 2016, the eastern gorilla lost more than 70 percent of its population, and by 2016 the total population was estimated to be less than 6,000. An exception to this declining trend is the mountain gorilla. According to the most recent estimates, there are approximately 1,004 mountain gorillas, and their numbers continue to grow.

In some national parks, viewing mountain gorillas is a popular tourist attraction. These national parks include Volcanoes National Park in Rwanda, Virunga National Park in the Democratic Republic of the Congo, and Mgahinga Gorilla National Park and Bwindi Impenetrable National Park in Uganda. While ecotourism can benefit gorilla populations by generating revenue for conservation efforts, there is concern that increased exposure to humans will place gorillas at greater risk of contracting zoonotic diseases. Studies have shown that habituated eastern gorillas, that is, those that leave protected areas to forage in surrounding communities, have higher disease rates than their unhabituated counterparts, with nearby humans and livestock as the likely sources of transmission.

Unlike the western gorilla, there are few eastern gorillas in zoos. The Antwerp Zoo is the only zoo outside the native range of the species that has eastern gorillas. Outside the native range, the mountain gorilla is not held in captivity at all. Small groups consisting of animals confiscated from poachers are kept in the Democratic Republic of Congo: Grauer's gorillas at the Gorilla Rehabilitation and Conservation Education (GRACE) center in Tayna Nature Reserve, and mountain gorillas at the Senkwekwe Center in Virunga National Park.
