= Fabrizio Cortesi =

Italian botanist

Fabrizio Cortesi (1879-1949) was an Italian botanist. He collected in Italy and Ethiopia.

He was the third Conservator of the Orto Botanico dell'Università di Catania, following Peter Romualdo Pirotta and Emilio Chiovenda. He was also Associated with the Muséum national d'histoire naturelle and the Natural History Museum (BM)
