= Aserrí F.C. =

Costa Rican football club

Aserrí
- Full name: Asociación Deportiva Aserrí Fútbol Club
- Nickname: Caciques
- Founded: 1940
- Ground: ST Center; Aserrí, San José Province, Costa Rica
- Capacity: 2,500
- Chairman: Carlos Solano
- Manager: Minor Barquero
- League: Liga de Ascenso
- Apertura 2023: 2° - Group B
Home colours	Away colours

Asociación Deportiva Aserrí Fútbol Club is a Costa Rican football club from the canton of Aserrí, San José Province. It was founded in 1940 and currently play in the Segunda División de Costa Rica.

== History ==
Aserrí F.C. is a soccer team based in the canton of Aserrí, Costa Rica. The club was founded in 1940 by a group of individuals who were determined to create a team that would represent their canton in local and national tournaments.

The origins of Aserrí F.C. can be traced back to 1940 when a well-known national politician named Ernesto Maten Carranza formed a soccer team named after himself. The team sported the initials "E.M.C" on their kits. The team participated in local and neighborhood tournaments, including one that took place in front of the church in what is now the Desamparados park.

The team included several notable players such as Elías Jiménez, Jorge Gómez, Miguel Ramos, Francisco Chinchilla, Luis Fallas, Efraín Rojas, who was the general captain, Guillermo Abarca, Juan Rafael Solano (known as Yico), Chico Calvo, and Olman Vargas, among others. Yico, in particular, was renowned for his exquisite technique and played barefoot, according to popular accounts.

In 1943, Ernesto Maten Carranza lost interest in the team and decided to stop financing it, which led to its eventual disappearance. However, a few months later, soccer leaders at the national level invited the canton of Aserrí to participate in the first cantonal championship, which was to take place at the National Stadium. In response to this invitation, a group of enthusiastic people in the municipality of Aserrí formed a directive and created a new team to represent their canton. They named the team "Club Atlético Central Aserriceño" (C.A.C.A.) and gave it a green and white uniform with striped shirts. The base of this new team was the recently disappeared EMC.

C.A.C.A. participated in the cantonal championship and received dividends totaling ¢150 colones as a reward. However, the directors were reportedly not satisfied and decided to discontinue the team, causing it to disappear. The players were not content with this outcome and began discussing possible solutions in the pulperías (local meeting centers). Efraín Rojas took the lead and suggested that they meet at the priest's house to discuss the matter further.

The meeting took place in 1945 and was attended by Elías Jiménez, Juan Rafael Solano (Yico), Francisco Chico Calvo, Marcelino Cascante (Mamino), Carlos Castro, and Rafael Porras Chinchilla. From that day forward, Aserrí F.C. was officially established. The first board of directors was composed of Captain General Efraín Rojas, Secretary Rafael Porras Chinchilla, and Treasurer Carlos Castro.

However, the team faced several challenges in its early days. There was no uniform, and they had no balls or money. But then they remembered the ¢150 colones that they had earned as a profit from the cantonal championship. They obtained the money from the directors of C.A.C.A. and used it to purchase a uniform from Paco Navarrete tailor shop. The uniform had red shirts with a diagonal white stripe. In total, they bought 12 field shirts and 1 goalkeeper shirt for a total cost of ¢120 colones. The remaining ¢30 colones were used to buy two soccer balls, each worth ¢15 colones, from the Sport Center, a well-known sports store.

Aserrí F.C. played its first game against the Manuel Hidalgo Mora School and won with a score of 4 to 2.

== Stadium ==
This property was previously an open field for amateur soccer. In 2007, and thanks to the investment of Mr. Minor Vargas (Costa Rican businessman) and his Icon Group, an agreement was reached with the Municipality of the canton to turn it into a quality stadium, despite its small size.

The ST Center has a synthetic grass, bleachers for 2,500 people (although it can be increased depending on the event) and also has artificial lighting.

It has been the headquarters of Costa Rican First and Second Division clubs, such as Brujas Fútbol Club (team now defunct), Asociación Deportiva Barrio México and Aserrí Fútbol Club.

Currently, the stadium is managed by the sons of Minor Vargas, thanks to the contracts still in force with the Santa Teresita de Aserrí Development Association.

== Current squad ==
As of June 7, 2023

Note: Flags indicate national team as defined under FIFA eligibility rules; some limited exceptions apply. Players may hold more than one non-FIFA nationality.

No.	Pos.	Nation	Player
1	GK	CRC	Justin Morera
3	DF	CRC	Kendall Diaz
4	DF	CRC	Alejandro Calvo
5	DF	CRC	Joseph Velerio (Captain)
8	MF	CRC	Menuel Morales
9	FW	CRC	Steven Badilla
10	MF	CRC	Izhar Quirós
11	MF	CRC	Darrin Rojas
12	MF	CRC	Gustavo Campos
14	FW	CRC	Andrey Duran

No.	Pos.	Nation	Player
16	FW	CRC	Paulo Méndez
17	MF	CRC	Ritley Treminio
20	DF	CRC	Anthony Díaz
22	GK	CRC	Nestor Mena
24	MF	CRC	Jeremy Araya
25	GK	CRC	Anthony Velázquez
—	DF	CRC	Jose Artavia
—	DF	CRC	Esteban Hidalgo
—	DF	CRC	Kendall Mora

== Top scorers ==
- Jorge Jimenez 27
- Jason Montero 22
- Marvin Vargas 17
- Aczel Salguero 17
- Juan Luis Jawnyj 14
- Juan Jose Cruz 12
- Reiby Smith 12
- Frank Zamora 12
- Erick Araya 11
- Keisha Davis 11
