= Ney Yépez Cortés =

Ney Yépez Cortés (born 1968, in Quito) is an Ecuadorian writer, journalist, poet, songwriter, screenwriter, lecturer, and teacher of tai chi, Reiki and Qigong.

The Encyclopedia of Science Fiction called Yépez Cortés "one of the most cited authors of the new generation of Ecuadorian science fiction writers". His first book of short stories Mundos abiertos was a collection of stories written in a 15-year period. One of the stories, "Segundo tiempo", was written when he was 16 years old. He published surrealist poems in the magazine Ixo facto. The success of his first book of short stories led to a second collection titled Historias ocultas which he wrote in a 2-month period.

In 2006, Yépez Cortés published his first novel Las sombras de la Casa Mitre, and its sequel El árbol de las brujas was published in 2009. These two books are part of a trilogy whose third book has not yet been published (as of 2013). In 2013, he published the book "La vuelta del músico", of short stories.

== Works ==
Fiction

- Mundos abiertos (2001) short stories
- Historias ocultas (2003)short stories
- Las sombras de la casa Mitre (2006) novel
- El árbol de las brujas (2009) novel
- Crónicas Intraterrestres en la cueva de Los Tayos (2011) novel
- La vuelta del músico (2013) short stories
- El Águila y la Dama Tapada (2016) novel
- El secreto de la reliquia sagrada (2019) novel

He has also written manuals on Eastern philosophy and practices:

- Tui Na Shou Fa - la técnica de manos
- Chi Kung - el arte de la energía vital
- Meditación y Visualización
- El poder de los Mudras
- Iniciación Reiki Do
- Feng Shui de la escuela Bagua
- Reiki Qigong - tratamientos avanzados

As a musician-composer, he has performed compositions in different musical genres and has edited the following works:

- "Dama Tapada" (hard rock - progressive), 2016
- "Past and Present" (acoustic rock - folk), 2014
- "Biography" (rock - pop - progressive), 2011
- "Bamboo Spirit" (new age), 2008
- "Guided Meditations" (new age), 2006
- "Mantra Live" (alternative rock), 2001
- "Ney and Disconnected" (acoustic rock - folk), 1997
- "Intrigo" (acoustic rock - folk), 1993
- "Duo Vadis" (acoustic rock - folk), 1987
