= Religious views on love =

Religious views on love vary widely between different religions.

== Specific religious views ==
=== Abrahamic religions ===
==== Baháʼí Faith ====
"Love is the mystery of divine revelations! Love is the effulgent manifestation! Love is the spiritual fulfilment! Love is the light of the Kingdom! Love is the breath of the Holy Spirit inspired into the human spirit! Love is the cause of the manifestation of the Truth (God) in the phenomenal world!. Love is the necessary tie proceeding from the realities of things through divine creation!"

— `Abdu'l-Bahá, Tablets of `Abdu'l-Bahá v3

Bahá'u'lláh, founder of the Baháʼí Faith, taught that God created humans due to his love for them, and thus humans should in turn love God. `Abdu'l-Bahá, Bahá'u'lláh's son, wrote that love is the greatest power in the world of existence and the true source of eternal happiness. The Baháʼí teachings state that all genuine love is divine, and that love proceeds from God and from humans. God's love is taught to be part of his own essence, and his love for his creatures gives them their material existence, divine grace and eternal life.

The Baháʼí teachings state that human love is directed towards both God and other humans; that the love of God attracts the individual toward God, by purifying the human heart and preparing it for the revelation of divine grace. Thus through the love of God, humans become transformed and become self-sacrificing. It is also stated that true love for other humans occurs when people see the beauty of God in other people's souls. The Baháʼí teachings state that Baháʼís should love all humans regardless of religion, race or community, and also should love their enemies.

==== Christianity ====
Christians also believe that God is the source and essence of eternal love, even if in the New Testament the expression "God is love" explicitly occurs only twice and in two not too distant verses: 1 John 4:8,16 (NIV).

Christians believe that the greatest commandment is "thou shalt love the Lord thy God with all thy heart, and with all thy soul, and with all thy mind, and with all thy strength: this is the first commandment"; in addition to the second, "thou shalt love thy neighbour as thyself", these are what Jesus Christ called the two greatest commandments (see Mark 12:28–34, Luke 10:25–28, Matthew 22:37–39, Matthew 7:12; cf. Deuteronomy 6:5, Deuteronomy 11:13, Deuteronomy 11:22, Leviticus 19:18, Leviticus 19:34). See also Ministry of Jesus#General ethics.

In the Gospel of John, Jesus said: "A new command I give you: Love one another. As I have loved you, so you must love one another. By this all men will know that you are my disciples, if you love one another." (NIV, John 13:34–35; cf. John 15:17). Jesus also taught "Love your enemies." (Matthew 5:44, Luke 6:27).

"Love is patient; love is kind. It does not envy, it does not boast, it is not proud. It is not rude, it is not self-seeking, it is not easily angered, it keeps no record of wrongs. Love does not delight in evil but rejoices with the truth. It always protects, always trusts, always hopes, always perseveres."

— 1 Corinthians 13:4–7 (NIV)

The New Testament, which was written in Greek, only used two Greek words for love: agapē and philia. However, there are several Greek words for love.

- Agapē. In the New Testament, agapē is charitable, selfless, and unconditional. It is primarily a decision of will and self sacrifice. Agape is the way God is seen to love humanity, and it is seen as the kind of love that Christians aspire to have for others.
- Philos. Also used in the New Testament, philos is distinguished from agape as being a more emotional love or friendship. Thus it is also known as "brotherly love".
- Eros (sexual love) is not used in the New Testament but is found in the Greek version of the Old Testament known as the Septuagint.
- Storge (love for those alike - such as family love, nationalism, love for one's tribe) is not strictly found in the New Testament but does appear within the compound word philostorgos (Rom 12:10).

Saint Paul glorifies agapē in the quote above from 1 Corinthians 13, and as the most important virtue of all: "Love never fails. But where there are prophecies, they will cease; where there are tongues, they will be stilled; where there is knowledge, it will pass away." (13:8 NIV).

Christians believe that because of God's agapē for humanity He sacrificed his Son for them. John the Apostle wrote, "For God so loved the world, that he gave his only begotten Son, that whosoever believeth in him should not perish, but have everlasting life. For God sent not his Son into the world to condemn the world; but that the world through him might be saved." (John 3:16–17 KJV)

In Works of Love (1847), Søren Kierkegaard, a philosopher, claimed that Christianity is unique because love is a requirement.

Regarding love for enemies, Jesus is quoted in the Gospel of Matthew chapter five:

“You have heard that it was said, ‘Love your neighbor and hate your enemy.’ But I tell you, love your enemies and pray for those who persecute you, that you may be children of your Father in heaven. He causes his sun to rise on the evil and the good, and sends rain on the righteous and the unrighteous. If you love those who love you, what reward will you get? Are not even the tax collectors doing that? And if you greet only your own people, what are you doing more than others? Do not even pagans do that? Be perfect, therefore, as your heavenly Father is perfect.” - Matthew 5: 43-48

Tertullian wrote regarding love for enemies: “Our individual, extraordinary, and perfect goodness consists in loving our enemies. To love one's friends is common practice, to love one's enemies only among Christians.”

===== Latter-day Saints =====
According to Russell M. Nelson, there are examples of the love of Jesus in the Book of Mormon.

First there is a covenant with Christ. King Benjamin stated in the Book of Mosiah:

And now, because of the covenant which ye have made ye shall be called the children of Christ, his sons, and his daughters; for behold, this day he hath spiritually begotten you; for ye say that your hearts are changed through faith on his name; therefore, ye are born of him and have become his sons and his daughters.

— Mosiah 5:7

Then there are the ordinances of the gospel. Jesus stated in the Book of Mormon in Third Nephi:

Now this is the commandment: Repent, all ye ends of the earth, and come unto me and be baptized in my name, that ye may be sanctified by the reception of the Holy Ghost, that ye may stand spotless before me at the last day.

— 3 Nephi 27:20

And at last Jesus exhorts his followers to follow his example:

And know ye that ye shall be judges of this people, according to the judgment which I shall give unto you, which shall be just. Therefore, what manner of men ought ye to be? Verily I say unto you, even as I am.

— 3 Nephi 27:27

Moroni, the last prophet of the book, wrote about love:

But charity is the pure love of Christ, and it endureth forever; and whoso is found possessed of it at the last day, it shall be well with him.

— Moroni 7:47

===== Unificationism =====
The concept of True Love is the most central part of Unificationist theology:

The central value in human life, which we may term "true love," means that which seeks the best for others and the betterment of human life in all its dimensions. True love means living for others, giving without thought of a return. Its source is transcendental, beyond the self; the person who practices true love taps into an inexhaustible reservoir of life. The various philosophies and religions of the world speak of this value with a variety of emphases, aspects, and concepts, such as: compassion, grace, justice, charity, liberation, righteousness, and agape love. While recognizing that certain of these aspects may sometimes be in tension (e.g., the well-known Jewish discussion of the dichotomy between divine justice and divine mercy), we may regard the positive tendency of all of them as aspects of a single divine and universal value. This value, true love, is the aspiration and hope of all human beings and the manifestation of the best in human nature.

==== Islam ====
In a Sahih Muslim Hadith, the Prophet Muhammad is reported to have said: “You will not enter paradise until you believe, and you will not believe until you love to the other Muslim what you love to your self.”

Muslims are directed by Allah ('God') in the ways to become close to Him and how to gain His love.

God loves those who:

- do good.
- are pure and clean.
- are righteous.
- are just and act rightly.
- trust Him.
- are patient and persevering.
- love Him and follow the Prophet.
- fight in His cause.

The Qur'an also says that God loved Moses, and God Himself will produce people He will love.

Here in this selection of verses we notice again the Arabic preference for the negative to state an opposite. While the following do not state that God hates, it certainly enforces the idea that the love of God is withheld from those who practice certain deeds or are described as manifesting a certain character. Several of the verses are repetitious and so we have the following categories.

God does not love:

- the mua'tadeen, those who overstep boundaries or limits.
- the mushrikeen, those who associate anything with God.
- the fasideen, those who spread corruption or mischief.
- the kafireen, the unbelievers.
- the dalemeen, the wrongdoers or oppressors.
- the musarifeen, the wasteful.
- the proud and boastful.
- those who boast in their riches.
- the treacherous.
- those who are given to crime and to evil speaking.

===== Ahmadiyya =====
According to the Ahmadiyya, love of the creatures of God is essential for all Muslims. Ahmadi Muslims express that the Qur'an was sent as a gift to mankind, and its teachings are filled with love, tolerance and respect. The founder of the Ahmadiyya sect in Islam, Mirza Ghulam Ahmad, said:

The task for which God has appointed me is that I should remove the malaise that afflicts the relationship between God and His creatures and restore the relationship of love and sincerity between them.

==== Judaism ====
"And you shall love the LORD your God with all your heart, and with all your soul, and with all your might."

— Deuteronomy 6:5

In Hebrew, Ahava is the most Commonly used term for both interpersonal love of family and love of God. Other related but dissimilar terms are chen (grace, good will, kindness) and chesed (kindness, love), which basically combines the meaning of "affection" and "compassion" and is sometimes rendered in English as "loving-kindness" or "steadfast love."

As for love between marital partners, this is deemed an essential ingredient to life: "See life with the wife you love" (Ecclesiastes 9:9). The Biblical book Song of Songs is considered a romantically phrased metaphor of love between God and his people, but in its plain reading reads like a love song.

=== Indian religions ===
==== Buddhism ====
In Buddhism, kāma, known as lust is a type of mental defilement (āsava) is believed to lead to sense-pleasure clinging (kamupadana) . The vast majority believe it to be an obstacle on the path to enlightenment.

On the contrary, maitrī is benevolent love. This love is unconditional and wishes the individual to have happiness and its causes. This is quite different from common conceptions of love which are often confused with attachment and sexual desire, and can be self-interested. Instead, in Buddhism it refers to detachment and unselfish interest in others' welfare.

==== Hinduism ====
In Hinduism, kama is pleasurable, personified by the god Kama. For many Hindu schools it is the third end in life.

In contrast to kāma, prema refers to elevated love. Love in Hinduism is sacrament. It preaches that one gives up selfishness in love, not expecting anything in return.

It also believes "God is love". A sacred text named Kanda Guru Kavasa quotes, " Oh holy Great flame, Grant me with love.. You said the spreading love is Para Brahma, For the thing which is everywhere is only Love, And Love is the only thing which is like a soul within us, Love is Kumara, Love is Kanda" This simply means Love is God.

The love of the Hindu deity Krishna with Radha and many other gopis (milkmaids) of Vrindavana is highly revered. His amorous dance with the gopis became known as the Rasa lila and were romanticised in the poetry of Jayadeva, the author of Gita Govinda. These became important as part of the development of the Krishna bhakti traditions worshiping Radha Krishna.

==== Sikhism ====
In Sikhism, love means love for the Lord and His creation. This is one of five virtues vigorously promoted by the Sikh Gurus. The other four qualities in the arsenal are truth (sat), contentment (santokh), compassion (daya), and humility (nimrata). These five qualities are essential for a Sikh and it is their duty to meditate on and recite the Gurbani so that these virtues become a part of their mindset.

Love is a positive and powerful tool in the Sikh's arsenal of virtues. When one's mind is full of love, one will overlook deficiencies in others and accept them wholeheartedly as a product of God. Sikhism asks all believers to take on godlike virtues, and this perhaps is the most godlike characteristic of all. Gurbani teaches that Waheguru is a "loving God" full of compassion and kindness. It is the duty of the Sikh to take on qualities of this nature and to easily forgive, never hate anyone, and live in Waheguru's Hukam and practise compassion and humility.

In the Dasam Granth, it is stated on ang 40 that "he, who is absorbed in True Love, he would realize the Lord."

==== Jainism ====
Champat Rai Jain, an influential Jaina writer termed the Jaina concept of Ahinsa as Universal love because of Jain scriptures's advocacy of compassion for all living beings. In Jain prayers like Meri Bhavna, a devotee specifically asks for cordial relationship with all sentient beings of the universe. Samayik Path, an 11th century Jain scripture by Acharya Amitgati is a compilation of 32 verses in Sanskrit language to contemplate during meditation. The first verse itself starts with satvyeshu maitreym which translates to 'May I have love for all living beings'.

== Love and deities ==
=== In polytheism ===
Different cultures have deified love in male and female forms. Below is a list of gods and goddesses of love.

- Áine, goddess of fertility and passionate love in Irish mythology
- Eros or Cupid, god of passionate love in Roman mythology
- Antheia, goddess in Crete mythology of love, flowers, gardens, and marshes
- Aonghus or Aengus, god of beauty, youth, and sensual love in Irish mythology
- Aphrodite, goddess of beauty and passionate love in Greek mythology
- Astarte, goddess of love in Canaanite mythology
- Eros, god of passionate love in Greek mythology
- Freyja, goddess of love, fertility and war in Norse mythology
- Hathor, goddess of love in Ancient Egyptian religion
- Inanna, goddess of sexual love in Sumerian religion
- Ishtar, goddess of love and war in Babylonian mythology
- Kama, god of sensual love in Hindu mythology
- Mihr, spirit of love in Persian mythology
- Rati, goddess of passionate love in Hindu mythology
- Venus, goddess of beauty and passionate love in Roman mythology
- Xochipilli, god in Aztec mythology

=== In monotheism ===
Although in monotheistic religions the supreme deity is believed to represent love, there are often angels or similar beings that may represent love as well.

== See also ==
- Love
- Philosophy of love
- Biology of romantic love

== Sources ==
- Greenberg, Yudit Kornberg (2008). Encyclopedia of Love in World Religions. ABC-CLIO. ISBN 978-1-85109-980-1.
