= Love =

Strong, positive emotional/mental states

Love encompasses a range of strong and positive emotional and mental states, from the most sublime virtue or good habit, the deepest interpersonal affection, to the simplest pleasure. An example of this range of meanings is that the love of a mother differs from the love of a spouse, which differs from the love for food. Most commonly, love refers to a feeling of strong attraction and emotional attachment.

Love is considered to be both positive and negative, with its virtue representing human kindness, compassion, and affection—"the unselfish, loyal and benevolent concern for the good of another"—and its vice representing a human moral flaw akin to vanity, selfishness, amour-propre, and egotism, potentially leading people into a type of mania, obsessiveness, or codependency. It may also describe compassionate and affectionate actions towards other humans, oneself, or animals. In its various forms, love acts as a major facilitator of interpersonal relationships and, owing to its central psychological importance, is one of the most common themes in the creative arts. Love has been postulated to be a function that keeps human beings together against menaces and to facilitate the continuation of the species.

Ancient Greek philosophers identified six forms of love: familial love (storge), friendly love or platonic love (philia), romantic love (eros), self-love (philautia), guest love (xenia), and divine or unconditional love (agape). Modern authors have distinguished further varieties of love: unrequited love, empty love, companionate love, consummate love, infatuated love, amour de soi, and courtly love. Numerous cultures have also distinguished Ren, Yuanfen, Mamihlapinatapai, Cafuné, Kama, Bhakti, Mettā, Ishq, Chesed, Amore, Charity, Saudade (and other variants or symbioses of these states), as culturally unique words, definitions, or expressions of love in regard to specified "moments" lacking in the English language.

The color wheel theory of love defines three primary, three secondary, and nine tertiary love styles, describing them in terms of the traditional color wheel. The triangular theory of love suggests intimacy, passion, and commitment are core components of love. Love has additional religious or spiritual meaning. This diversity of uses and meanings, combined with the complexity of the feelings involved, makes love unusually difficult to consistently define, compared to other emotional states.

== Definitions ==
The word "love" can have a variety of related but distinct meanings in different contexts. Many other languages use multiple words to express some of the different concepts that in English are denoted as "love"; one example is the plurality of Greek concepts for "love" (agape, eros, philia, storge). Cultural differences in conceptualizing love make it difficult to establish a universal definition.

Although the nature or essence of love is a subject of frequent debate, different aspects of the word can be clarified by determining what is not love (antonyms of "love"). Love, as a general expression of positive sentiment (a stronger form of like), is commonly contrasted with hate (or neutral apathy). As a less sexual and more emotionally intimate form of romantic attachment, love is commonly contrasted with lust. As an interpersonal relationship with romantic overtones, love is sometimes contrasted with friendship, although the word love is often applied to close friendships or platonic love. (Further possible ambiguities come with usages like "girlfriend", "boyfriend" and "just good friends".)

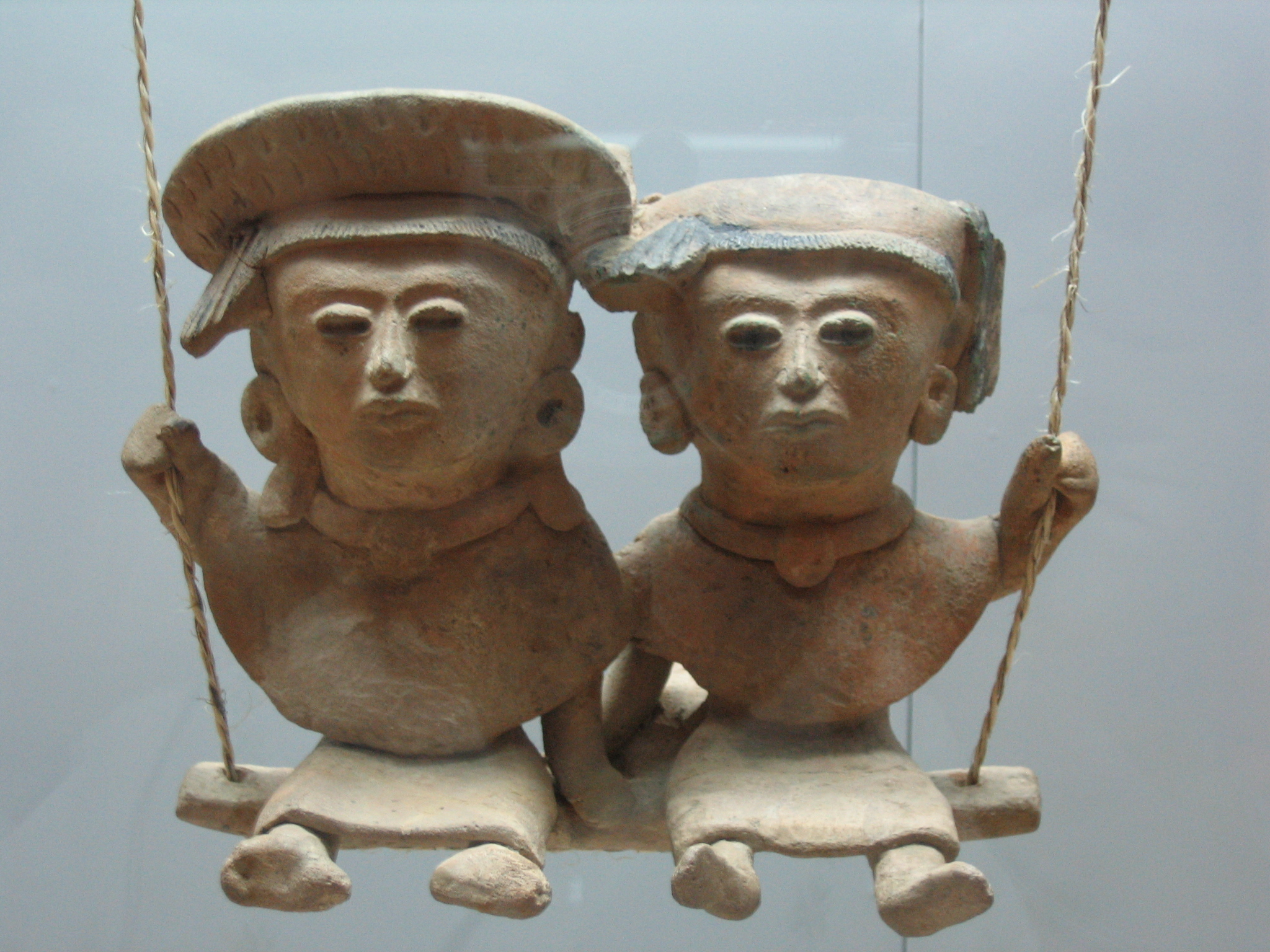
Fraternal love (Prehispanic sculpture from 250 to 900 CE, of Huastec origin). Museum of Anthropology in Xalapa, Veracruz, Mexico

Abstractly discussed, love usually refers to a feeling one person experiences for another person. Love often involves caring for, or identifying with, a person or thing (cf. vulnerability and care theory of love), including oneself (cf. narcissism). In addition to cross-cultural differences in understanding love, ideas about love have also changed greatly over time. Some historians date modern conceptions of romantic love to courtly Europe during or after the Middle Ages, although the prior existence of romantic attachments is attested by ancient love poetry.

Several common proverbs regard love, from Virgil's "Love conquers all" to The Beatles' "All You Need Is Love". St. Thomas Aquinas, following Aristotle, defines love as "to will the good of another". Bertrand Russell describes love as a condition of "absolute value", as opposed to relative value. Philosopher Gottfried Leibniz said that love is "to be delighted by the happiness of another". Meher Baba stated that in love there is a "feeling of unity" and an "active appreciation of the intrinsic worth of the object of love". Biologist Jeremy Griffith defines love as "unconditional selflessness". According to Ambrose Bierce, love is a temporary insanity curable by marriage.

== Impersonal ==
People can have a profound dedication and immense appreciation for an object, principle, or objective, thereby experiencing a sense of love towards it. For example, compassionate outreach and volunteer workers' "love" of their cause may sometimes be born not of interpersonal love but impersonal love, altruism, and strong spiritual or political convictions. People can also "love" material objects, animals, or activities if they invest themselves in bonding or otherwise identifying with those things. If sexual passion is also involved, then this feeling is called paraphilia.

== Interpersonal ==
Interpersonal love refers to love between human beings. It is a much more potent sentiment than liking a person. Unrequited love refers to feelings of love that are not reciprocated. Interpersonal love is most closely associated with interpersonal relationships. Such love might exist between family members, friends, and couples. There are several psychological disorders related to love, such as erotomania.

Throughout history, philosophy and religion have speculated about the phenomenon of love. In the 20th century, the science of psychology has studied the subject. The sciences of anthropology, neuroscience, and biology have also added to the understanding of the concept of love.

=== Biological basis ===
Simplistic overview of chemicals implicated in love

Biological models tend to view romantic love as a mammalian drive or motivation system, much like hunger or thirst. Helen Fisher, an anthropologist and human behavior researcher, divides the experience of love into three brain systems which can operate independently of one another: lust, attraction, and attachment. Lust is the feeling of sexual desire; attraction determines what partners find attractive and pursue, conserving time and energy by choosing a preferred mating partner over others; and attachment involves sharing a home, parental duties, mutual defense, and in humans involves feelings of safety and security.

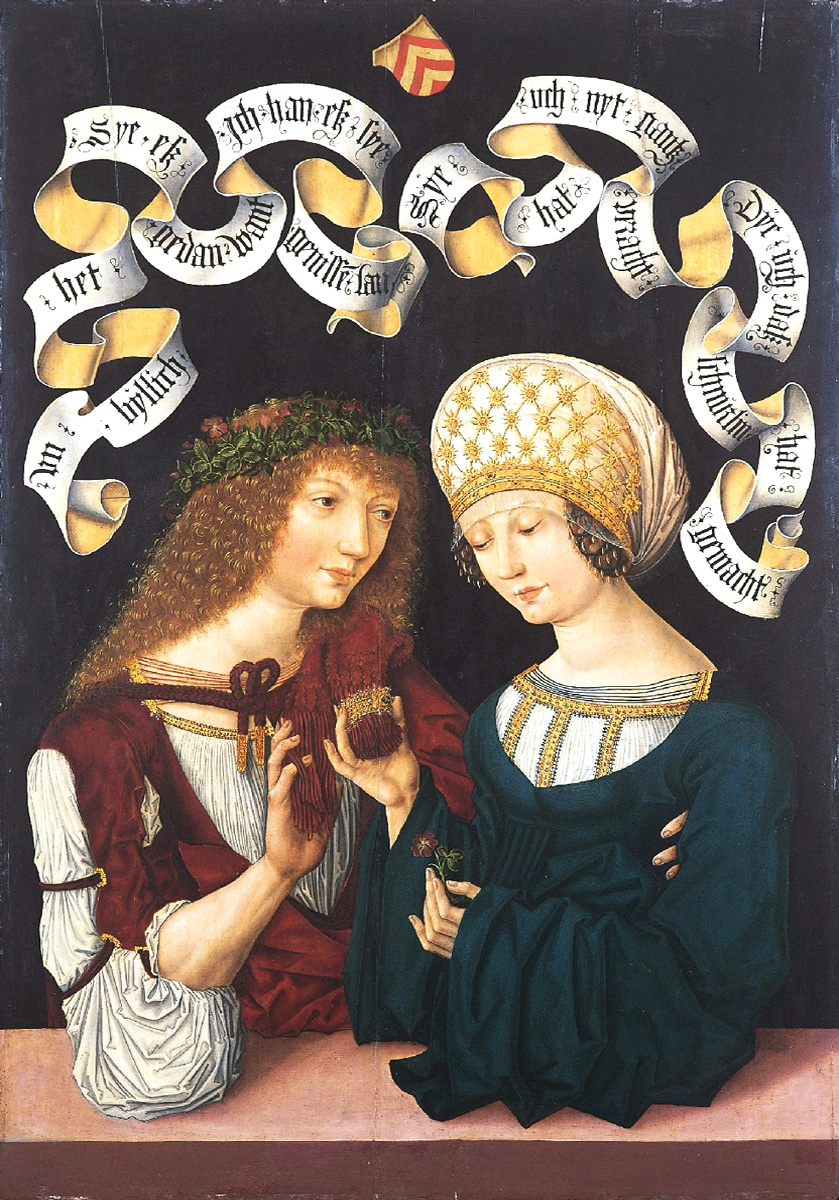
Pair of Lovers. 1480–1485

Lust is the initial passionate sexual desire that promotes mating, and involves the increased release of hormones such as testosterone and estrogen. These effects rarely last more than a few weeks or months. Attraction is the more individualized and romantic desire for a specific candidate for mating, which develops out of lust as commitment to an individual mate form. Recent studies in neuroscience have indicated that as people fall in love, the brain consistently releases a certain set of chemicals, including the neurotransmitter hormones dopamine, norepinephrine, and serotonin, the same compounds released by amphetamine, stimulating the brain's pleasure center and leading to side effects such as increased heart rate, reduced appetite and sleep, and an intense feeling of excitement. Research indicates that this stage generally lasts from one and a half to three years.

Since the lust and attraction stages are both considered temporary, a third stage is needed to account for long-term relationships. Attachment is the bonding that promotes relationships lasting for many years and even decades. Attachment is generally based on commitments such as marriage and children, or mutual friendship based on things like shared interests. It has been linked to higher levels of the chemicals oxytocin and vasopressin, to a greater degree than what is found in short-term relationships. Enzo Emanuele and coworkers reported the protein molecule known as the nerve growth factor (NGF) has high levels when people first fall in love, but these return to previous levels after one year.

=== Psychological basis ===
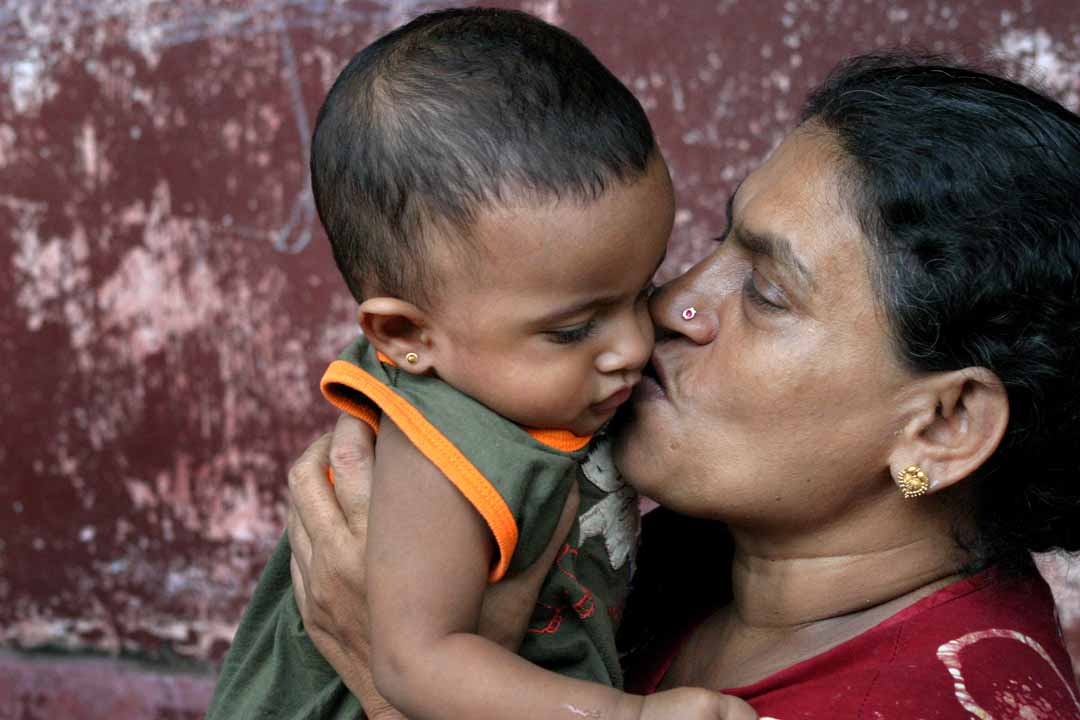
Grandmother and grandchild in Sri Lanka

Psychology depicts love as a cognitive and social phenomenon. Psychologist Robert Sternberg formulated a triangular theory of love in which love has three components: intimacy, commitment, and passion. Intimacy is when two people share confidences and various details of their personal lives, and is usually shown in friendships and romantic love affairs. Commitment is the expectation that the relationship is permanent. Passionate love is shown in infatuation as well as romantic love. All forms of love are viewed as varying combinations of these three components. Non-love does not include any of these components. Liking only includes intimacy. Infatuated love only includes passion. Empty love only includes commitment. Romantic love includes both intimacy and passion. Companionate love includes intimacy and commitment. Fatuous love includes passion and commitment. Consummate love includes all three components.

American psychologist Zick Rubin sought to define love by psychometrics in the 1970s. His work identifies a different set of three factors that constitute love: attachment, caring, and intimacy.

Following developments in electrical theories such as Coulomb's law, which showed that positive and negative charges attract, analogs in human life were envisioned, such as "opposites attract". Research on human mating has generally found this not to be true when it comes to character and personality—people tend to like people similar to themselves. However, in a few unusual and specific domains, such as immune systems, it seems that humans prefer others who are unlike themselves (e.g., with an orthogonal immune system), perhaps because this will lead to a baby that has the best of both worlds.

In recent years, various human bonding theories have been developed, described in terms of attachments, ties, bonds, and affinities. Some Western authorities disaggregate into two main components, the altruistic and the narcissistic. This view is represented in the works of Scott Peck, whose work in the field of applied psychology explored the definitions of love and evil. Peck maintains that love is a combination of the "concern for the spiritual growth of another" and simple narcissism. In combination, love is an activity, not simply a feeling.

Psychologist Erich Fromm maintained in his book The Art of Loving that love is not merely a feeling but is also actions, and that in fact the "feeling" of love is superficial in comparison to one's commitment to love via a series of loving actions over time. Fromm held that love is ultimately not a feeling at all, but rather is a commitment to, and adherence to, loving actions towards another, oneself, or many others, over a sustained duration. Fromm also described love as a conscious choice that in its early stages might originate as an involuntary feeling, but which then later no longer depends on those feelings, but rather depends only on conscious commitment.

=== Evolutionary basis ===
Wall of Love on Montmartre in Paris: "I love you" in 250 languages, by calligraphist Fédéric Baron and artist Claire Kito (2000)

Evolutionary psychology has attempted to provide various reasons for love as a survival tool. Humans are dependent on parental help for a large portion of their lifespans compared to other mammals. Love has therefore been seen as a mechanism to promote parental support of children for this extended time period. Furthermore, researchers as early as Charles Darwin identified unique features of human love compared to other mammals and credited love as a major factor for creating social support systems that enabled the development and expansion of the human species. Another factor may be that sexually transmitted diseases can cause, among other effects, permanently reduced fertility, injury to the fetus, and increase complications during childbirth. This would favor monogamous relationships over polygamy.

=== Adaptive benefit ===
Interpersonal love between a man and woman provides an evolutionary adaptive benefit since it facilitates mating and sexual reproduction. However, some organisms can reproduce asexually without mating. Understanding the adaptive benefit of interpersonal love depends on understanding the adaptive benefit of sexual reproduction as opposed to asexual reproduction. Richard Michod reviewed evidence that love, and consequently sexual reproduction, provides two major adaptive advantages. First, sexual reproduction facilitates repair of damages in the DNA that is passed from parent to progeny (during meiosis, a key stage of the sexual process). Second, a gene in either parent may contain a harmful mutation, but in the progeny produced by sexual reproduction, expression of a harmful mutation introduced by one parent is likely to be masked by expression of the unaffected homologous gene from the other parent.

=== Health ===
The psychologist Abraham Maslow identified a person feeling truly loved as a basic and foundational human need. Love has been found to have a strong correlation to happinness and being able to build relationships and develop communities. Adverse effects of feeling unloved can result in conditions such post-traumatic stress disorder (PTSD).

== Cultural views ==
=== Ancient Greek ===
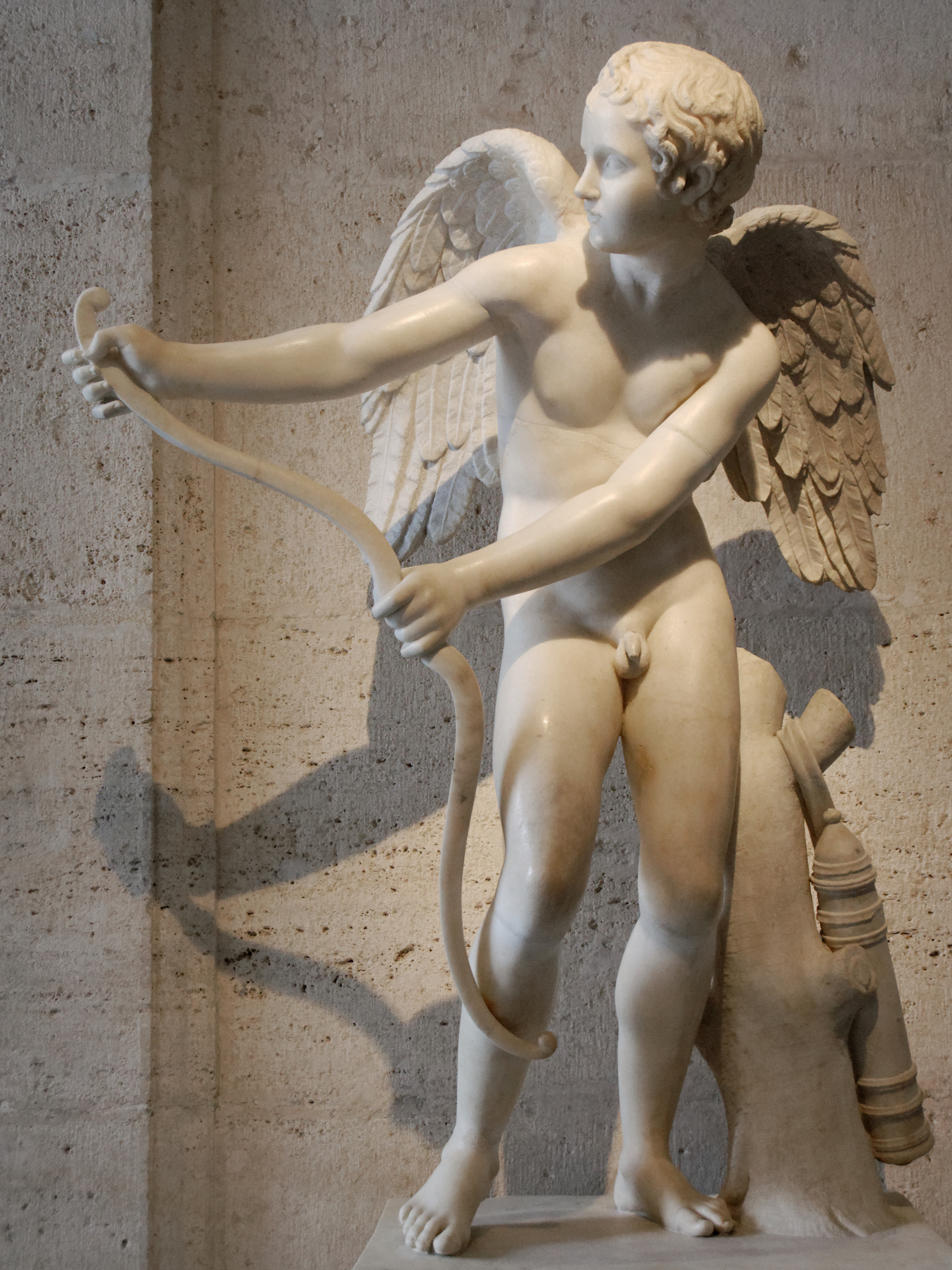
Roman copy of a Greek sculpture by Lysippus depicting Eros, the Greek personification of romantic love

Greek distinguishes several different senses in which the word "love" is used. Ancient Greeks identified four forms of love: kinship or familiarity (storge), friendship and/or platonic desire (philia), sexual and/or romantic desire (eros), and self-emptying or divine love (agape). Modern authors have distinguished further varieties of romantic love. However, with Greek (as with many other languages), it has been historically difficult to separate the meanings of these words totally. At the same time, the Ancient Greek text of the Bible has examples of the verb agapo having the same meaning as phileo.

Agape (ἀγάπη agápē)
love in modern-day Greek. The term s'agapo means I love you in Greek. The word agapo is the verb I love. It generally refers to a "pure", ideal type of love, rather than the physical attraction suggested by eros. However, there are some examples of agape used to mean the same as eros. It has also been translated as "love of the soul".
Eros (ἔρως érōs)
(from the Greek deity Eros) is passionate love, with sensual desire and longing. The Greek word erota means in love. Plato refined his own definition. Although eros is initially felt for a person, with contemplation it becomes an appreciation of the beauty within that person, or even becomes appreciation of beauty itself. Eros helps the soul recall knowledge of beauty and contributes to an understanding of spiritual truth. Lovers and philosophers are all inspired to seek truth by eros. Some translations list it as "love of the body".
Philia (φιλία philía)
dispassionate virtuous love, was a concept addressed and developed by Aristotle in his Nicomachean Ethics Book VIII. It includes loyalty to friends, family, and community, and requires virtue, equality, and familiarity. Philia is motivated by practical reasons; one or both of the parties benefit from the relationship. It can also mean "love of the mind".
Storge (στοργή storgē)
natural affection, like that felt by parents for offspring
Xenia (ξενία xenía)
hospitality, was an extremely important practice in ancient Greece. It was an almost ritualized friendship formed between a host and his guest, who could previously have been strangers. The host fed and provided quarters for the guest, who was expected to repay only with gratitude. The importance of this can be seen throughout Greek mythology—in particular, Homer's Iliad and Odyssey.

=== Ancient Roman (Latin) ===
The Latin language has several verbs corresponding to the English word "love". amō is the basic verb meaning I love, with the infinitive amare ("to love") as it still is in Italian today. The Romans used it both in an affectionate sense as well as in a romantic or sexual sense. From this verb come amans—a lover, amator, "professional lover", often with the accessory notion of lechery—and amica, "girlfriend" in the English sense, often being applied euphemistically to a prostitute. The corresponding noun is amor (the significance of this term for the Romans is well illustrated in the fact, that the name of the city, Rome—in Latin: Roma—can be viewed as an anagram for amor, which was used as the secret name of the City in wide circles in ancient times), which is also used in the plural form to indicate love affairs or sexual adventures. This same root also produces amicus—"friend"—and amicitia, "friendship" (often based to mutual advantage, and corresponding sometimes more closely to "indebtedness" or "influence"). Cicero wrote a treatise called On Friendship (de Amicitia), which discusses the notion at some length. Ovid wrote a guide to dating called Ars Amatoria (The Art of Love), which addresses, in depth, everything from extramarital affairs to overprotective parents.

Latin sometimes uses amāre where English would simply say to like. This notion, however, is much more generally expressed in Latin by the terms placere or delectāre, which are used more colloquially, the latter used frequently in the love poetry of Catullus. Diligere often implies "to be affectionate for", "to esteem", and rarely if ever is used for romantic love. This word would be appropriate to describe the friendship of two men. The corresponding noun diligentia, however, has the meaning of "diligence" or "carefulness", and has little semantic overlap with the verb. Observare is a synonym for diligere; despite the cognate with English, this verb and its corresponding noun, observantia, often denote "esteem" or "affection". Caritas is used in Latin translations of the Christian Bible to mean "charitable love"; this meaning, however, is not found in Classical pagan Roman literature. As it arises from a conflation with a Greek word, there is no corresponding verb.

=== Chinese and other Sinic ===
愛 (Mandarin: ài), the traditional Chinese character for love, contains a heart (心) in the middle.

Two philosophical underpinnings of love exist in the Chinese tradition, one from Confucianism which emphasized actions and duty while the other came from Mohism which championed a universal love. A core concept to Confucianism is 仁 (Ren, "benevolent love"), which focuses on duty, action, and attitude in a relationship rather than love itself. In Confucianism, one displays benevolent love by performing actions such as filial piety from children, kindness from parents, loyalty to the king and so forth.

The concept of 愛 (Mandarin: ài) was developed by the Chinese philosopher Mozi in the 4th century BCE in reaction to Confucianism's benevolent love. Mozi tried to replace what he considered to be the long-entrenched Chinese over-attachment to family and clan structures with the concept of "universal love" (兼愛, jiān'ài). In this, he argued directly against Confucians who believed that it was natural and correct for people to care about different people in different degrees. Mozi, by contrast, believed people in principle should care for all people equally. Mohism stressed that rather than adopting different attitudes towards different people, love should be unconditional and offered to everyone without regard to reciprocation; not just to friends, family, and other Confucian relations. Later in Chinese Buddhism, the term Ai (愛) was adopted to refer to a passionate, caring love and was considered a fundamental desire. In Buddhism, Ai was seen as capable of being either selfish or selfless, the latter being a key element towards enlightenment.

In Mandarin Chinese, 愛 (ài) is often used as the equivalent of the Western concept of love. 愛 (ài) is used as both a verb (e.g. 我愛你, Wǒ ài nǐ, or "I love you") and a noun (such as 愛情 àiqíng, or "romantic love"). However, due to the influence of Confucian 仁 (rén), the phrase 我愛你 (Wǒ ài nǐ, I love you) carries with it a very specific sense of responsibility, commitment, and loyalty. Instead of frequently saying "I love you" as in some Western societies, the Chinese are more likely to express feelings of affection in a more casual way. Consequently, "I like you" (我喜欢你, Wǒ xǐhuan nǐ) is a more common way of expressing affection in Mandarin; it is more playful and less serious. This is also true in Japanese (suki da, 好きだ).

=== Japanese ===
The Japanese language uses three words to convey the English equivalent of "love". Because "love" covers a wide range of emotions and behavioral phenomena, there are nuances distinguishing the three terms. The term ai (愛), which is often associated with maternal love or selfless love, originally referred to beauty and was often used in a religious context. Following the Meiji Restoration of 1868, the term became associated with "love" in order to translate Western literature.

Prior to Western influence, the term koi (恋 or 孤悲) generally represented romantic love, and was often the subject of the popular Man'yōshū Japanese poetry collection. Koi describes a longing for a member of the opposite sex and is typically interpreted as selfish and wanting. The term's origins come from the concept of lonely solitude as a result of separation from a loved one. Though modern usage of koi focuses on sexual love and infatuation, the Manyō used the term to cover a wider range of situations, including tenderness, benevolence, and material desire.

The third term, ren'ai (恋愛), is a more modern construction that combines the kanji characters for both ai and koi, though its usage more closely resembles that of koi in the form of romantic love.

Amae (甘え), referring to the desire to be loved and cared for by an authority figure, is another important aspect of Japan's cultural perspective on love, and has been analysed in detail in Takeo Doi's The Anatomy of Dependence

=== Indian ===
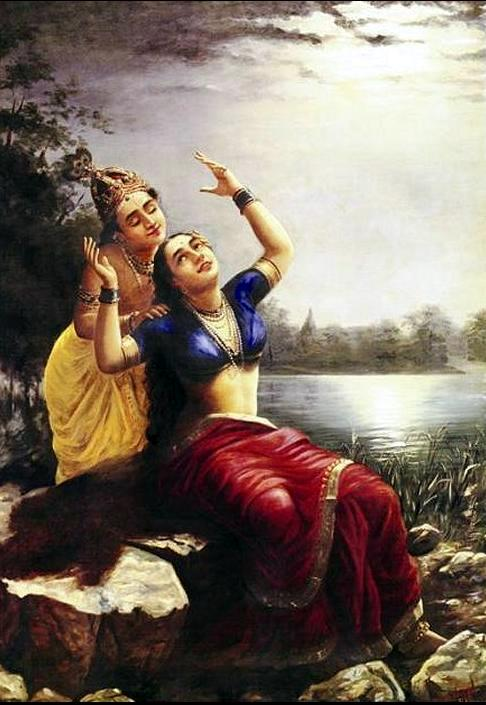
The love stories of the Hindu deities Krishna and Radha have influenced the Indian culture and arts. Above: Radha Madhavam by Raja Ravi Varma.

In contemporary literature, the Sanskrit words for love is sneha. Other terms include priya which refers to innocent love, prema refers to spiritual love, and kama refers usually to sexual desire. However, the term also refers to any sensory enjoyment, emotional attraction and aesthetic pleasure such as from arts, dance, music, painting, sculpture and nature.

The concept of kama is found in some of the earliest known verses in Vedas. For example, Book 10 of Rig Veda describes the creation of the universe from nothing by the great heat. In hymn 129, it states:

कामस्तदग्रे समवर्तताधि मनसो रेतः परथमं यदासीत |
सतो बन्धुमसति निरविन्दन हर्दि परतीष्याकवयो मनीषा ||

Thereafter rose Desire in the beginning, Desire the primal seed and germ of Spirit,
Sages who searched with their heart's thought discovered the existent's kinship in the non-existent.

— Rig Veda, ~ 15th century BCE

The Classical Tamil Sangam poetry explored romantic love between two people. In Kuṟuntokai 40, attributed to Sempulapēyaneerār and classified under the Kurinji landscape, the hero describes the lovers’ hearts as having mingled like rainwater falling on red earth.

"My mother and your mother,

what are they to each other? My father and your father, how are they related? You and I, how did we know each other? Like rainwater that falls and merges with the red earth, our

loving hearts have become one."

— Kuṟuntokai -40, Red earth and pouring rain, Kurinji Thinai – What the hero said to the heroine, about their love

"As a little white snake

with lovely stripes on its young body troubles the jungle elephant this slip of a girl her teeth like sprouts of new rice her wrists stacked with bangles

troubles me."Kuṟuntokai, poem 119

=== Persian ===
The children of Adam are limbs of one body
Having been created of one essence.
When the calamity of time afflicts one limb
The other limbs cannot remain at rest.
If you have no sympathy for the troubles of others
You are not worthy to be called by the name of "man".

— Sa'di, Gulistan

Rumi, Hafiz, and Sa'di are icons of the passion and love that the Persian culture and language present. The Persian word for love is Ishq, which is derived from Arabic; however, it is considered by most to be too stalwart a term for interpersonal love and is more commonly substituted with "doost dashtan" ("liking"). In the Persian culture, everything is encompassed by love and all is for love, starting from loving friends and family, husbands and wives, and eventually reaching the divine love that is the ultimate goal in life.

== Religious views ==
=== Abrahamic ===
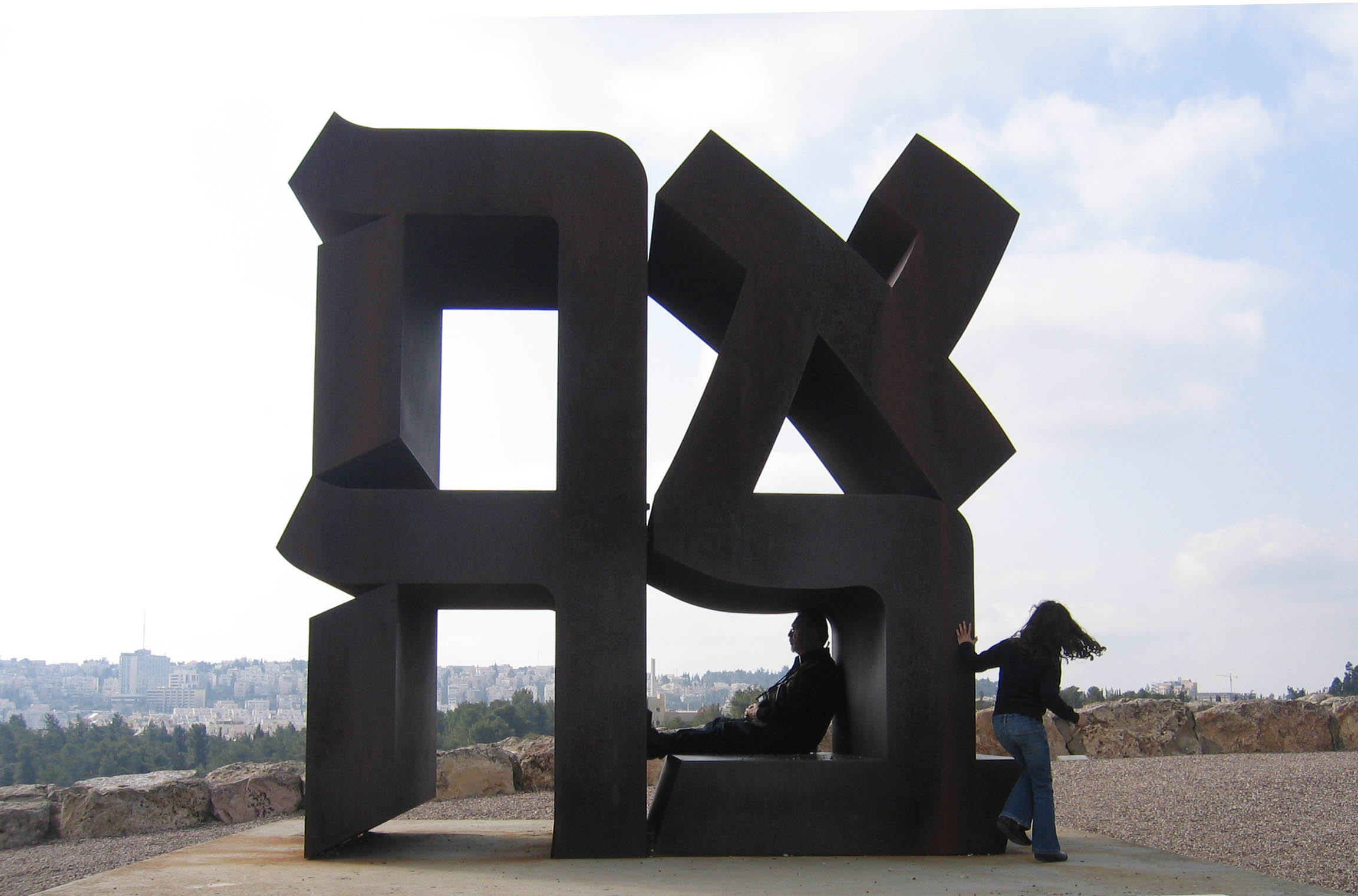
Robert Indiana's 1977 Love sculpture spelling ahava

==== Judaism ====
In Hebrew, אהבה (ahava) is the most commonly used term for both interpersonal love and love between God and God's creations. Chesed, often translated as loving-kindness, is used to describe many forms of love between human beings.

The commandment to love other people is given in the Torah, which states, "Love your neighbor like yourself" (Leviticus 19:18). The Torah's commandment to love God "with all your heart, with all your soul and with all your might" (Deuteronomy 6:5) is taken by the Mishnah (a central text of the Jewish oral law) to refer to good deeds, willingness to sacrifice one's life rather than commit certain serious transgressions, willingness to sacrifice all of one's possessions, and being grateful to the Lord despite adversity (tractate Berachoth 9:5). Rabbinic literature differs as to how this love can be developed, e.g., by contemplating divine deeds or witnessing the marvels of nature.

As for love between marital partners, this is deemed an essential ingredient to life: "See life with the wife you love" (Ecclesiastes 9:9). Rabbi David Wolpe writes that "love is not only about the feelings of the lover... It is when one person believes in another person and shows it." He further states that "love... is a feeling that expresses itself in action. What we really feel is reflected in what we do." The biblical book Song of Solomon is considered a romantically phrased metaphor of love between God and his people, but in its plain reading it reads like a love song. The 20th-century rabbi Eliyahu Eliezer Dessler is frequently quoted as defining love from the Jewish point of view as "giving without expecting to take".

==== Christianity ====
The Christian understanding is that love comes from God, who is himself love (1 John 4:8). The love of man and woman—eros in Greek—and the unselfish love of others (agape), are often contrasted as "descending" and "ascending" love, respectively, but are ultimately the same thing.

There are several Greek words for "love" that are regularly referred to in Christian circles.

agape
In the New Testament, agapē is charitable, selfless, altruistic, and unconditional. It is parental love, seen as creating goodness in the world; it is the way God is seen to love humanity, and it is seen as the kind of love that Christians aspire to have for one another.
phileo
Also used in the New Testament, phileo is a human response to something that is found to be delightful. Also known as "brotherly love".

Two other words for love in the Greek language, eros (sexual love) and storge (child-to-parent love), were never used in the New Testament.

Christians believe that to love God with all your heart, mind, and strength and love your neighbor as yourself are the two most important things in life (the greatest commandment of the Jewish Torah, according to Jesus; cf. Gospel of Mark 12:28–34). Saint Augustine summarized this when he wrote, "Love God, and do as thou wilt."

The Apostle Paul glorified love as the most important virtue of all. Describing love in the famous poetic interpretation in 1 Corinthians 13, he wrote, "Love is patient, love is kind. It does not envy, it does not boast, it is not proud. It is not rude, it is not self-seeking, it is not easily angered, it keeps no record of wrongs. Love does not delight in evil but rejoices with the truth. It always protects, always trusts, always hopes, and always perseveres." (1 Corinthians 13:4–7)

The Apostle John wrote, "For God so loved the world that he gave his one and only Son, that whoever believes in him shall not perish but have eternal life. For God did not send his Son into the world to condemn the world, but to save the world through him." (John 3:16–17) John also wrote, "Dear friends, let us love one another for love comes from God. Everyone who loves has been born of God and knows God. Whoever does not love does not know God, because God is love." (1 John 4:7–8)

Saint Augustine wrote that one must be able to decipher the difference between love and lust. Lust, according to Saint Augustine, is an overindulgence, but to love and be loved is what he has sought for his entire life. He even says, "I was in love with love." Finally, he does fall in love and is loved back, by God. Saint Augustine says the only one who can love you truly and fully is God, because love with a human only allows for flaws such as "jealousy, suspicion, fear, anger, and contention". According to Saint Augustine, to love God is "to attain the peace which is yours".

Augustine regards the duplex commandment of love in Matthew 22 as the heart of Christian faith and the interpretation of the Bible. After the review of Christian doctrine, Augustine treats the problem of love in terms of use and enjoyment until the end of Book I of De Doctrina Christiana (1.22.21–1.40.44).

Christian theologians see God as the source of love, which is mirrored in humans and their own loving relationships. Influential Christian theologian C. S. Lewis wrote a book called The Four Loves. Benedict XVI named his first encyclical God is love. He said that a human being, created in the image of God, who is love, is able to practice love; to give himself to God and others (agape) and by receiving and experiencing God's love in contemplation (eros). This life of love, according to him, is the life of the saints such as Teresa of Calcutta and Mary, the mother of Jesus and is the direction Christians take when they believe that God loves them.

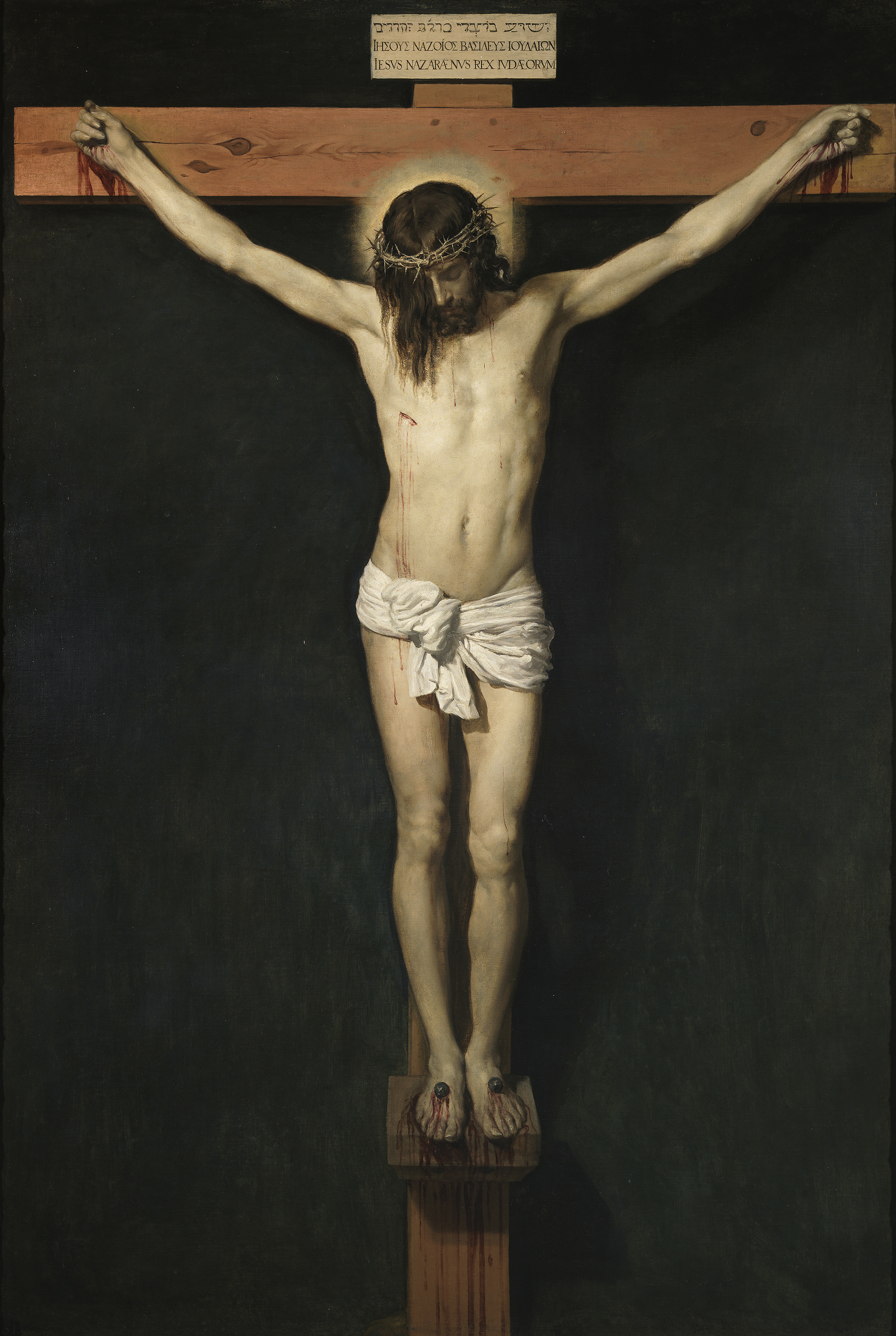
Pope Francis: the "Cross (Jesus crucified) is the greatest meaning of the greatest love".

Pope Francis asserts that the "Cross (Jesus crucified) is the greatest meaning of the greatest love", and in the crucifixion is found everything, all knowledge and the entirety of God's love. Pope Francis taught that "True love is both loving and letting oneself be loved... what is important in love is not our loving, but allowing ourselves to be loved by God." And so, in the analysis of a Catholic theologian, for Pope Francis, "the key to love... is not our activity. It is the activity of the greatest, and the source, of all the powers in the universe: God's."

In Christianity the practical definition of love is summarized by Thomas Aquinas, who defined love as "to will the good of another", or to desire for another to succeed. This is an explanation of the Christian need to love others, including their enemies. Thomas Aquinas explains that Christian love is motivated by the need to see others succeed in life, to be good people.

Regarding love for enemies, Jesus is quoted in the Gospel of Matthew:

You have heard that it was said, "Love your neighbor and hate your enemy." But I tell you, love your enemies and pray for those who persecute you, that you may be children of your Father in heaven. He causes his sun to rise on the evil and the good, and sends rain on the righteous and the unrighteous. If you love those who love you, what reward will you get? Are not even the tax collectors doing that? And if you greet only your own people, what are you doing more than others? Do not even pagans do that? Be perfect, therefore, as your heavenly Father is perfect.

— Matthew 5:43–48

Tertullian wrote regarding love for enemies: "Our individual, extraordinary, and perfect goodness consists in loving our enemies. To love one's friends is common practice, to love one's enemies only among Christians."

==== Islam ====
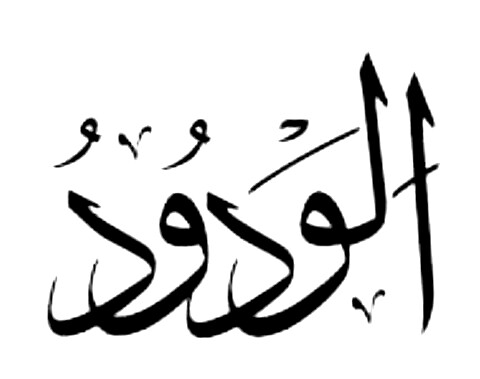
In Islam, one of the 99 names of God is Al-Wadūd, which means "The Loving".

Love encompasses the Islamic view of life as universal brotherhood that applies to all who hold faith. Among the 99 names of God (Allah) is the name Al-Wadud, or "the Loving One", which is found in Surah 11:90 and 85:14. God is also referenced at the beginning of every chapter in the Qur'an as Ar-Rahman and Ar-Rahim, or the "Most Compassionate" and the "Most Merciful", indicating that nobody is more loving, compassionate, and benevolent than God. The Qur'an refers to God as being "full of loving kindness".

The Qur'an exhorts Muslim believers to treat all people, those who have not persecuted them, with birr or "deep kindness" as stated in Surah 6:8-9. Birr is also used by the Qur'an to describe the love and kindness that children must show to their parents.

Ishq, or divine love, is emphasized by Sufism in the Islamic tradition. Practitioners of Sufism believe that love is a projection of the essence of God into the universe. God desires to recognize beauty, and as if one looks at a mirror to see oneself, God "looks" at himself within the dynamics of nature. Since everything is a reflection of God, the school of Sufism practices seeing the beauty inside the apparently ugly. Sufism is often referred to as the religion of love. God in Sufism is referred to in three main terms—Lover, Loved, and Beloved—with the last of these terms often seen in Sufi poetry. A common viewpoint of Sufism is that through love, humankind can return to its inherent purity and grace. The saints of Sufism are infamous for being "drunk" due to their love of God; hence, the constant reference to wine in Sufi poetry and music.

==== Bahá'í Faith ====
In his Paris Talks, `Abdu'l-Bahá described four types of love: the love that flows from God to human beings; the love that flows from human beings to God; the love of God towards the Self or Identity of God; and the love of human beings for human beings.

=== Dharmic ===
==== Buddhism ====
In Buddhism, kāma is sensuous, sexual love. It is an obstacle on the path to enlightenment, since it is selfish. Karuṇā is compassion and mercy, which reduces the suffering of others. It is complementary to wisdom and is necessary for enlightenment. Adveṣa and mettā are benevolent love. This love is unconditional and requires considerable self-acceptance. This is quite different from ordinary love, which is usually about attachment and sex and which rarely occurs without self-interest. Instead, in Buddhism love refers to detachment and unselfish interest in others' welfare.

The Bodhisattva ideal in Mahayana Buddhism involves the complete renunciation of oneself in order to take on the burden of a suffering world.

==== Hinduism ====
Kama (left) with Rati on a temple wall of Chennakesava Temple, Belur

In Hinduism, kāma is pleasurable, sexual love, personified by the god Kamadeva. For many Hindu schools, it is the third end (Kama) in life. Kamadeva is often pictured holding a bow of sugar cane and an arrow of flowers; he may ride upon a great parrot. He is usually accompanied by his consort Rati and his companion Vasanta, lord of the spring season. Stone images of Kamadeva and Rati can be seen on the door of the Chennakeshava Temple, Belur, in Karnataka, India. Maara is another name for kāma.

In contrast to kāma, prema—or premefers to elevated love. Karuṇā is compassion and mercy, which impels one to help reduce the suffering of others. Bhakti is a Sanskrit term meaning "loving devotion to the supreme God". A person who practices bhakti is called a bhakta. Hindu writers, theologians, and philosophers have distinguished nine forms of bhakti, which can be found in the Bhagavata Purana and works by Tulsidas. The philosophical work Narada Bhakti Sutra, written by an unknown author (presumed to be Narada), distinguishes eleven forms of love.

In certain Vaishnava sects within Hinduism, attaining unadulterated, unconditional, and incessant love for the Godhead is considered the foremost goal of life. Gaudiya Vaishnavas who worship Krishna as the Supreme Personality of Godhead and the cause of all causes consider Love for Godhead (Prema) to act in two ways: sambhoga and vipralambha (union and separation)—two opposites.

In the condition of separation, there is an acute yearning for being with the beloved and in the condition of union, there is supreme happiness and nectarean. Gaudiya Vaishnavas consider that Krishna-prema (Love for Godhead) burns away one's material desires, pierces the heart, and washes away everything—one's pride, one's religious rules, and one's shyness. Krishna-prema is considered to make one drown in the ocean of transcendental ecstasy and pleasure. The love of Radha, a cowherd girl, for Krishna is often cited as the supreme example of love for Godhead by Gaudiya Vaishnavas. Radha is considered to be the internal potency of Krishna, and is the supreme lover of Godhead. Her example of love is considered to be beyond the understanding of material realm as it surpasses any form of selfish love or lust that is visible in the material world. The reciprocal love between Radha (the supreme lover) and Krishna (God as the Supremely Loved) is the subject of many poetic compositions in India such as the Gita Govinda of Jayadeva and Hari Bhakti Shuddhodhaya.

In the Bhakti tradition within Hinduism, it is believed that execution of devotional service to God leads to the development of Love for God (taiche bhakti-phale krsne prema upajaya), and as love for God increases in the heart, the more one becomes free from material contamination (krishna-prema asvada haile, bhava nasa paya). Being perfectly in love with God or Krishna makes one perfectly free from material contamination, and this is the ultimate way of salvation or liberation. In this tradition, salvation or liberation is considered inferior to love, and just an incidental by-product. Being absorbed in Love for God is considered to be the perfection of life.

== Political views ==
=== Free love ===
The term "free love" has been used to describe a social movement that rejects marriage, which is seen as a form of social bondage. The free love movement's initial goal was to separate the state from sexual matters such as marriage, birth control, and adultery. It claimed that such issues were the concern of the people involved, and no one else.

Many people in the early 19th century believed that marriage was an important aspect of life to "fulfill earthly human happiness". Middle-class Americans wanted the home to be a place of stability in an uncertain world. This mentality created a vision of strongly defined gender roles, which provoked the advancement of the free love movement as a contrast.

Advocates of free love had two strong beliefs: opposition to the idea of forceful sexual activity in a relationship and advocacy for a woman to use her body in any way that she pleases. These are also beliefs of feminism.

== Philosophical views ==
The philosophy of love is a field of social philosophy and ethics that attempts to explain the nature of love. The philosophical investigation of love includes the tasks of distinguishing between the various kinds of personal love, asking if and how love is or can be justified, asking what the value of love is, and what impact love has on the autonomy of both the lover and the beloved.

== See also ==
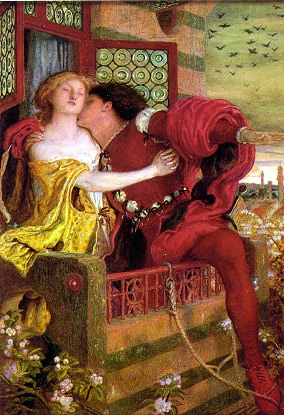
Romeo and Juliet, depicted as they part on the balcony in Act III, 1867 by Ford Madox Brown

- Aloha – Hawaiian word for love, affection, peace, compassion, and mercy
- Color wheel theory of love – Love typology by J. A. Lee
- Finger heart – Hand gesture
- Hand heart – Affectionate hand gesture
- Heart in hand – Symbol of charity
- Human bonding – Process of development of a close, interpersonal relationship
- ILY sign – American Sign Language gesture
- Love at first sight – Falling in long-lasting love on first sight
- Love-in – Peaceful public gathering
- Pair bond – Biological term
- Polyamory – Consensual intimacy with multiple partners
- Relationship science – Field dedicated to the scientific study of interpersonal relationship processes
- Romance – Love focused on feelings
- Self-love – Concept in philosophy and psychology
- Social connection – Experience of feeling close and connected to others
- Traditional forms, Agape, Philia, Philautia, Storge, Eros: Greek terms for love

== Sources ==
- Chadwick, Henry (1998). Saint Augustine Confessions. Oxford: Oxford University Press. ISBN 978-0-19-283372-3.
- Fisher, Helen (2004). Why We Love: the Nature and Chemistry of Romantic Love. New York : H. Holt. ISBN 978-0-8050-6913-6.
- Giles, James (1994). "A theory of love and sexual desire". Journal for the Theory of Social Behaviour. 24 (4): 339–357. doi:10.1111/j.1468-5914.1994.tb00259.x.
- Kierkegaard, Søren (2009). Works of Love. New York: Harper Perennial Modern Classics. ISBN 978-0-06-171327-9.
- Oord, Thomas Jay (2010). Defining Love: A Philosophical, Scientific, and Theological Engagement. Grand Rapids, MI: Brazos. ISBN 978-1-58743-257-6.
- Singer, Irving (1966). The Nature of Love. Vol. (in three volumes) (v.1 reprinted and later volumes from The University of Chicago Press, 1984 ed.). Random House. ISBN 978-0-226-76094-0.
- Sternberg, R.J. (1986). "A triangular theory of love". Psychological Review. 93 (2): 119–135. doi:10.1037/0033-295X.93.2.119.
- Sternberg, R.J. (1987). "Liking versus loving: A comparative evaluation of theories". Psychological Bulletin. 102 (3): 331–345. doi:10.1037/0033-2909.102.3.331.
- Tennov, Dorothy (1979). Love and Limerence: the Experience of Being in Love. New York: Stein and Day. ISBN 978-0-8128-6134-1.
- Wood Samuel E., Ellen Wood and Denise Boyd (2005). The World of Psychology (5th ed.). Pearson Education. pp. 402–403. ISBN 978-0-205-35868-7.
