= Greek words for love =

Group of concepts in Ancient Greek philosophy

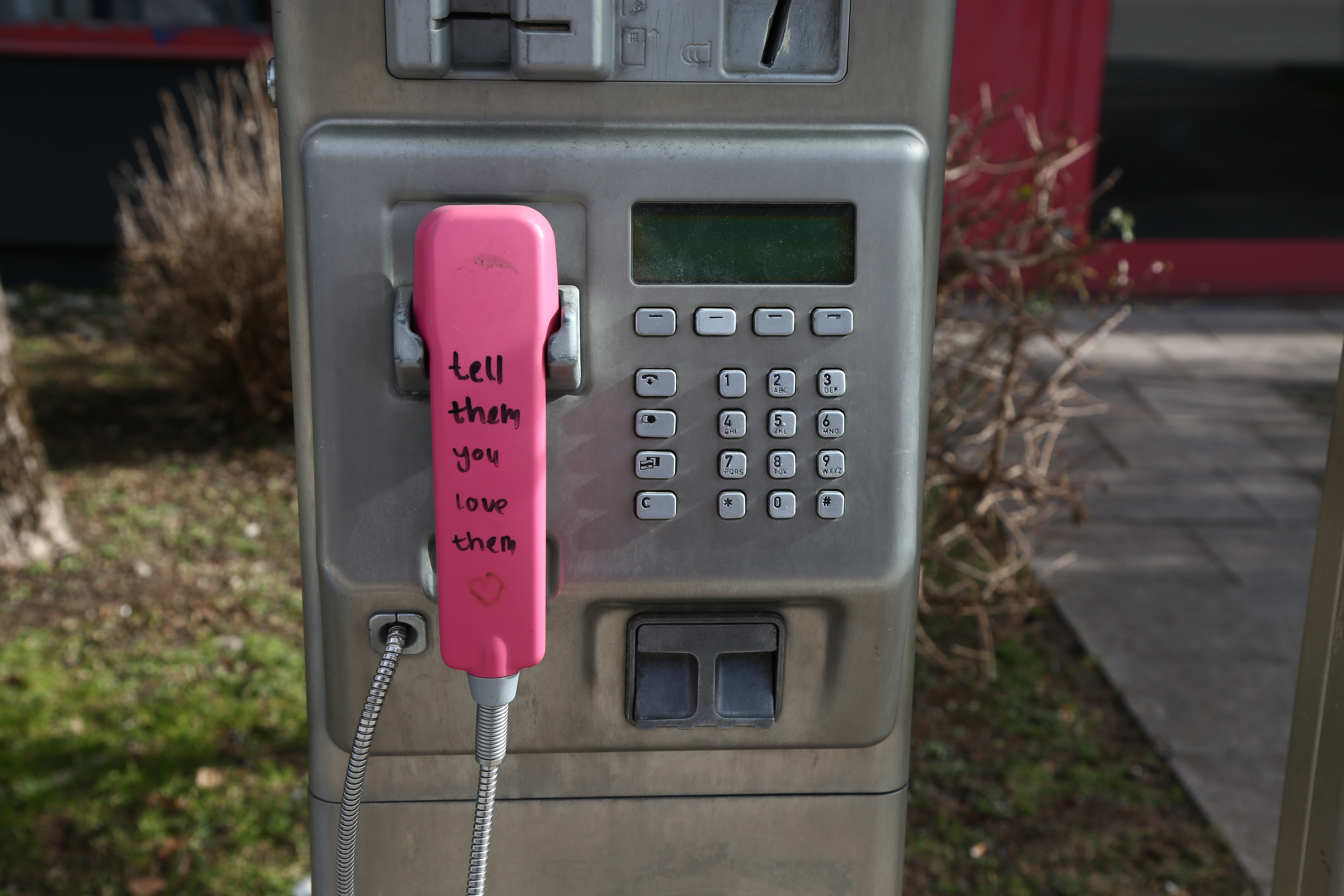
A payphone on which is written, "Tell them you love them"

The Greek language has at least six different words to describe love. The Greek words for love include agápē, érōs, philía, philautía, storgē, and xenía; some of which are based in ancient Greek philosophy, particularly Aristotle and Plato.

== List of concepts ==
Though there are more Greek words for love, variants and possibly subcategories, a general summary considering these Ancient Greek concepts is:

- Agape (ἀγάπη, agápē) means, when translated literally, affection, as in "greet with affection" and "show affection for the dead". The verb form of the word "agape" goes as far back as Homer. In a Christian context, agape means "love: esp. unconditional love, charity; the love of God for person and of person for God". Agape is also used to refer to a love feast. The Christian priest and philosopher Thomas Aquinas described agape as "to will the good of another".
- Eros (ἔρως, érōs) means "love, mostly of the sexual passion". The Modern Greek word "erotas" means "intimate love". Plato refined his own definition: Although eros is initially felt for a person, with contemplation it becomes an appreciation of the beauty within that person, or and may ultimately transcend particulars to become an appreciation of beauty itself, hence the concept of platonic love to mean "without physical attraction". In Plato's Symposium, Socrates argues that eros helps the soul recall its inherent knowledge of ideal beauty and spiritual truth. Thus, the ideal form of youthful beauty arouses erotic desire, but also points toward higher spiritual ideals.
- Philia (φιλία, philía) means "affectionate regard, friendship", usually "between equals". It is a dispassionate virtuous love. In Aristotle's Nicomachean Ethics, philia is expressed variously as loyalty to friends ("brotherly love"), family, and community; it requires virtue, equality, and familiarity.
- Storge (στοργή, storgē) means "love, affection" and "especially of parents and children". It is the common or natural empathy, like that felt by parents for offspring. It is rarely used in ancient works, almost exclusively to describe family relationships. It may also express mere acceptance or tolerance, as in "loving" the tyrant. It may also describe love of country or enthusiasm for a favorite sports team.
- Philautia (φιλαυτία, philautía) means "self-love". To love oneself or "proper regard for and attention to one's own happiness or well-being" has been conceptualized both as a basic human necessity and as a moral flaw, akin to vanity and selfishness, synonymous with amour-propre or egotism. The Greeks further divided this love into positive and negative: one, the unhealthy version, is the self-obsessed love, and the other is the concept of self-compassion. Aristotle also considers philautia to be the root of a general kind of love for family, friends, the enjoyment of an activity, as well as that between lovers.
- Xenia (ξενία, xenía) is an ancient Greek concept of hospitality, "guest-friendship", or "ritualized friendship". It was a social institution requiring generosity, gift exchange, and reciprocity. Hospitality towards foreigners and traveling Hellenes was understood as a moral obligation under the patronage of Zeus Xenios and Athene Xenia. Many understand the Odyssey as a story principally concerned with the concept. For instance, the failure of the Suitors of Penelope to appropriately welcome disguised Odysseus into his own home can be seen as justification for their subsequent demise.

== See also ==
- Color wheel theory of love
- Diotima of Mantinea
- The Four Loves by C. S. Lewis
- Greek love
- Intellectual virtue – Greek words for knowledge
- Love
  - Cultural views
    - Aloha – Hawaiian word for love, affection, peace, compassion, and mercy
    - Chesed – Hebrew word referring to love or kindness
    - Ishq – Arabic word meaning 'love' or 'passion'
    - Kama – Concept of pleasure, enjoyment and desire in Hinduism, Buddhism, and Jainism
    - Maitrī – Buddhist term meaning "loving-kindness"
    - Ren (Confucianism) – Highest Confucian virtue
- Ludus (love)
- Plato's Pharmacy
- Platonic love
- Pragma (love)
- Restoration of Peter
- Sapphic love
