= Kuzbu =

Kuzbu is an Akkadian word which means "seductive allure" or "sexual appeal."

Kuzbu may refer to:

- Beauty
- Eros (concept)
- Seduction
- Sex appeal
