= Storge =

Ancient Greek word for affection

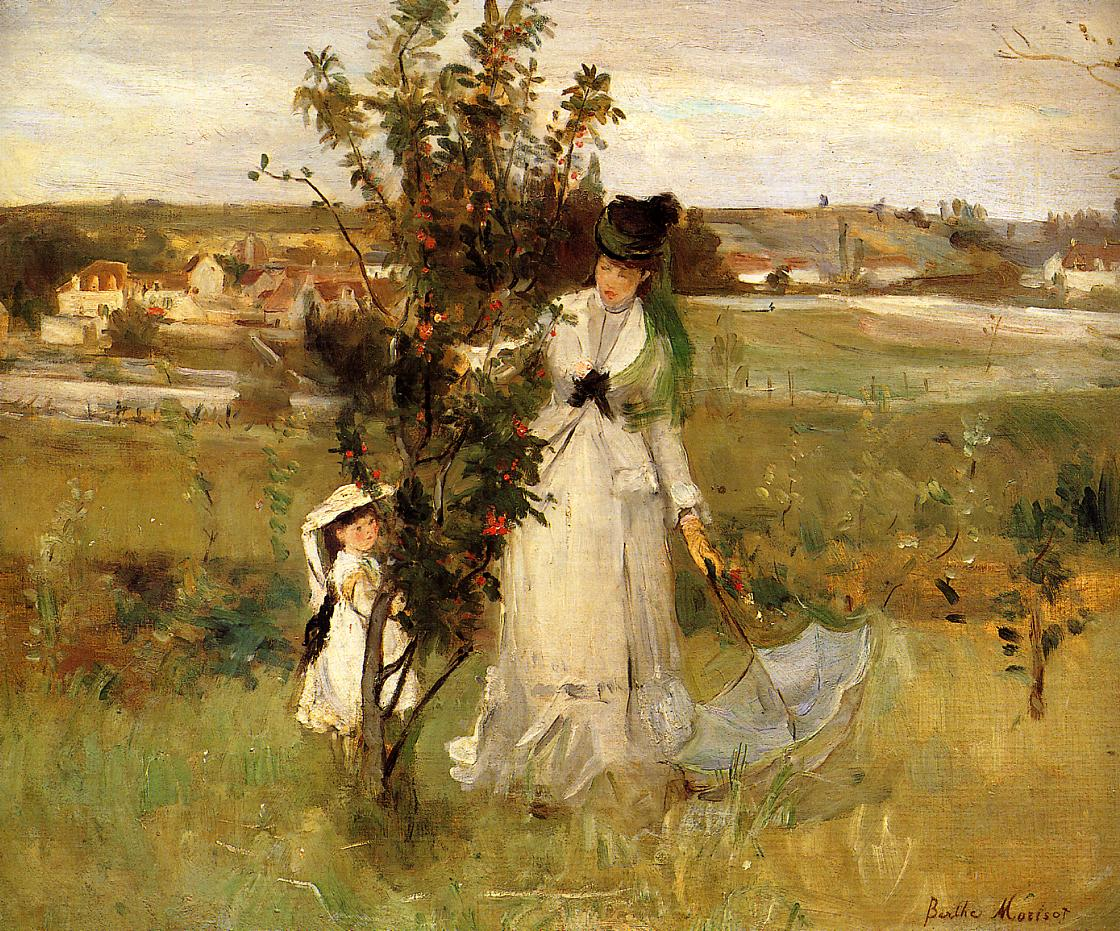
Hide and Seek (1873), by Berthe Morisot

Storge (/ˈstɔːrɡi/ STOR-ghee; from Ancient Greek στοργή (storgḗ) 'love, affection'), refers to natural or instinctual affection, such as the love between parents and their children. In Ancient Greece, storge was also used to describe a pet's feelings towards its owner.

Only rarely, storge (and the verb stérgō) was used in Ancient Greek contexts referring to sexual love, for a certain effect. For example, Marcus Argentarius once wrote "This is not erôs [...]; but when one has seen an ill-favored girl [...] and cherishes [stergei] her, aflame from within his mad breast."—evoking a more homely feeling towards the unattractive girl than eros, but then insinuating that such a feeling would be insanity.

The term storge was revived in English by the modern author C. S. Lewis, who refers to it in his 1960 book The Four Loves as equivalent to his concept of affection.

== Use in psychology ==
The word was borrowed by the Canadian sociologist John Alan Lee for his storge love style (a type of love story). The storge love style begins with friendship, growing only more gradually into a committed relationship. Such love might occur between childhood neighbors, or longtime school friends. It is possible, however, for a storgic relationship to occur between strangers if they share a similar background, and the quality of experience is right as the relationship develops. Storgic love comes naturally with time and the mutual enjoyment of shared activities, as one grows accustomed to another.

Storge has also been compared to the concept of companionate love, which the researcher Elaine Hatfield defines as "the affection we feel for those with whom our lives are deeply entwined". According to earlier theories, companionate love was said to be mainly a feature of the later stage of an intimate relationship, after initial romance or passionate love feelings (eros) subside; however, research has suggested that companionate love may actually be important (or present) in the early stages of a relationship too.

Lee's storge love style has also been related as a form of companionate love.

A meta-analytic factor analysis, however, found that companionate love (meaning intimacy and commitment, using the triangular theory of love) could be distinguished from the storge love attitude (labeled "practical friendship" by the study author).

== See also ==
- Attachment theory – Psychological ethological theory
- Color wheel theory of love – Love typology by J. A. Lee
- Greek words for love – Group of concepts in Ancient Greek philosophy
- Immediate family – Term for the closest family relatives
- Parental love – Feeling of attachment towards progeny
- Passionate and companionate love – Two basic love feelings
- Philia – Affection; one of the ancient Greek forms of love
- The Four Loves – 1960 book by C. S. Lewis

The dictionary definition of storge at Wiktionary
