= Parental love =

Feeling of attachment towards progeny

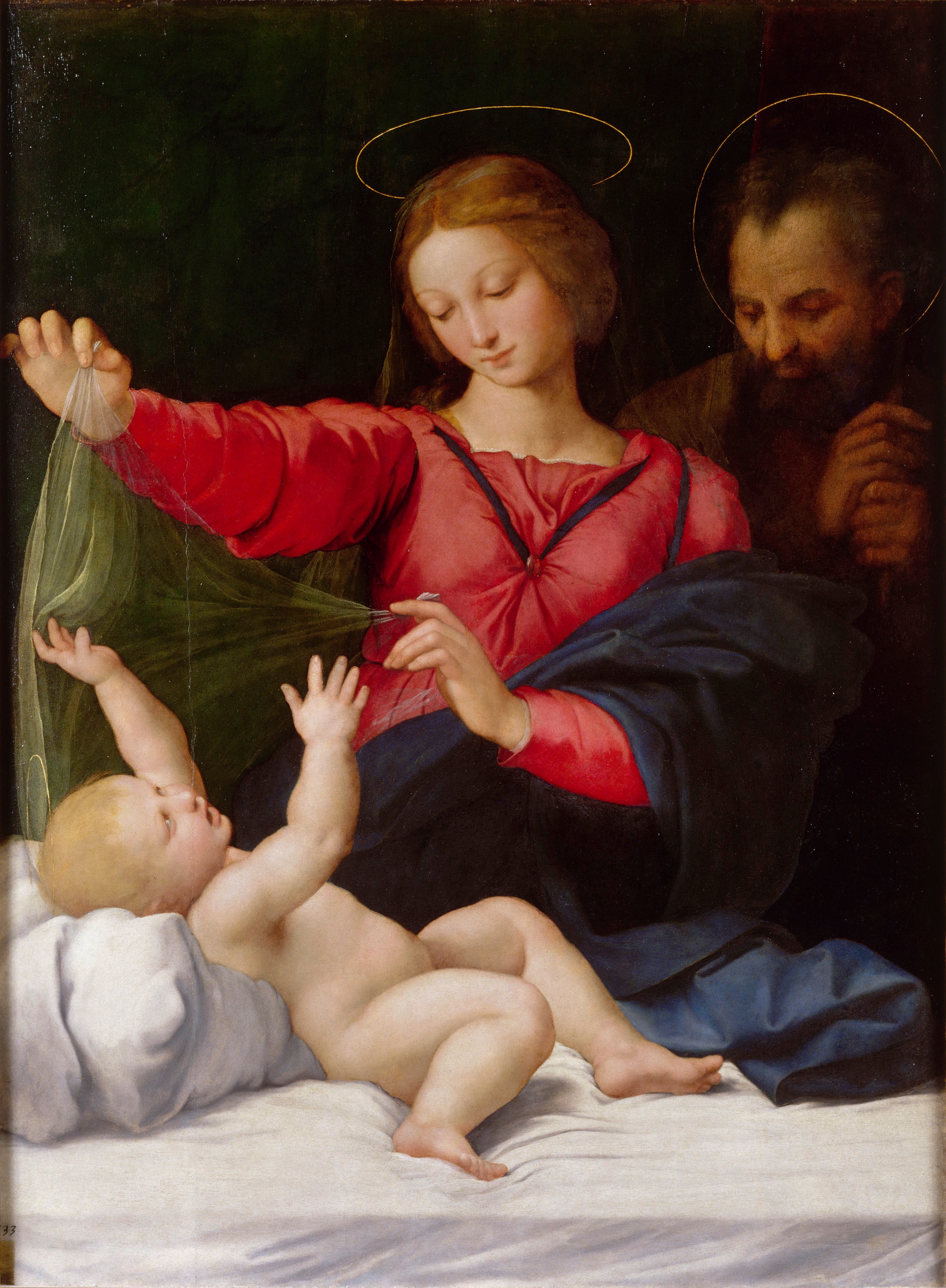
Madonna of Loreto, by Raphaël, c. 1511. The painting represents the Madonna and St. Joseph looking after baby Jesus.

Parental love or parental attachment is the enduring emotional bond that develops between parents (or primary caregivers) and their children. It plays a critical role in the child’s psychological, social, and biological development.

== Historical perspectives ==
Ancient and medieval writers discussed the topic of parental love. In his work Generation of Animals, the Greek philosopher Aristotle stated:

It looks as though nature herself desires to provide that there shall be a feeling of attention and care for the young offspring. In the inferior animals this feeling which she implants lasts only until the moment of birth; in others, until the offspring reaches its complete development; and in those that have more intelligence (phronimôtera), until its upbringing is completed (ektrophên). Those which are endowed with most intelligence show intimacy and affection (philia) towards their offspring even after they have reached their complete development (human beings and some of the quadrupeds are examples of this).

Lucretius, an Epicurean poet of the 1st century BC, argued that while human parental love is widespread, it lacks a natural basis compared to the instinctual bonds seen in animals. He illustrates this in his depictions of Iphigenia’s sacrifice and a cow’s grief for her calf, emphasizing both the fragility and societal necessity of human familial ties.

In his work Summa Theologiae, St. Thomas Aquinas addresses the question of whether one ought to love their parents more than their children. He argues that the degree of love should correspond to the resemblance of the beloved to God. Since parents serve as the origin or principle of an individual's life, a more exalted and God-like role, they are to be loved more than one’s children.

== Modern views ==
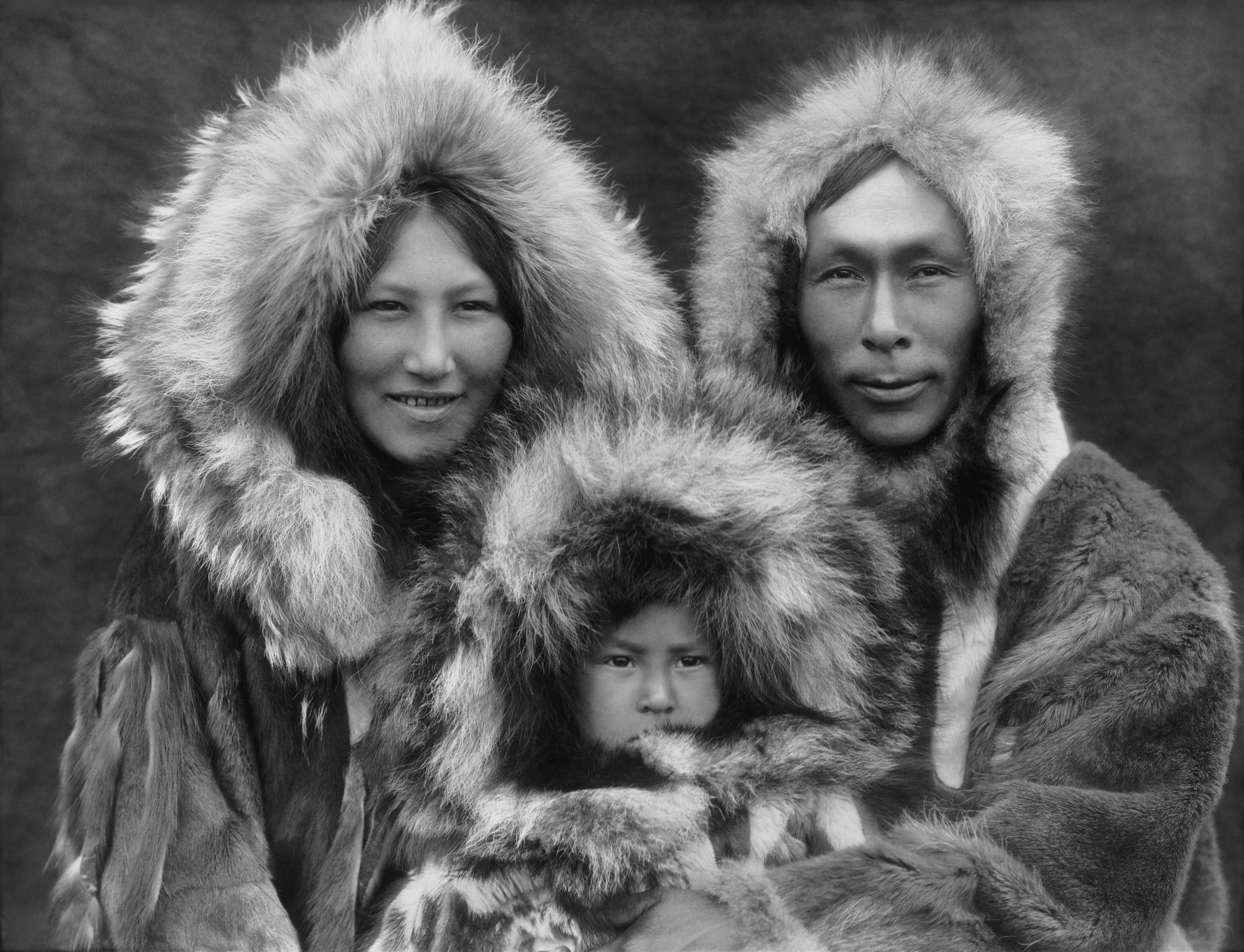
Inupiat Eskimo family portrait—mother, father, and son—photographed in Noatak, Alaska, c. 1929, by Edward S. Curtis for The North American Indian.

Psychologist Harry Harlow conducted a series of experiments in the 1950s and 1960s to study the nature of love and attachment, particularly between infants and their caregivers. Using rhesus monkeys as subjects, Harlow separated infant monkeys from their biological mothers and provided them with two surrogate mothers: one made of wire that dispensed milk and another made of soft cloth that did not provide food. His experiments revealed that the infant monkeys consistently preferred spending time with the cloth mother, seeking comfort and security, especially in times of stress, rather than the wire mother that provided nourishment. These findings challenged the then-prevailing behaviorist belief that attachment was primarily based on the satisfaction of physiological needs and highlighted the importance of emotional warmth and physical contact in the formation of early bonds.

Harry Harlow's work with rhesus monkeys preceded and influenced the development of attachment theory by psychiatrist and psychoanalyst John Bowlby. According to Bowlby, children need to form a close relationship with at least one primary caregiver to ensure their survival, and to develop healthy social and emotional functioning.

Evolutionary biologist Nicholas Christakis included the love of offspring among his list of eight universal human attributes. He argues that humans have evolved to genetically favor societies that have those attributes.

The Human Flourishing Program at Harvard University has conducted research on parenting practices and their impact on the long-term development and well-being of children into adulthood. Its research has indicated that the authoritative parenting style, characterized by high levels of parental love and discipline, is generally associated with the most favorable outcomes in childhood development.

== Biological mechanisms ==
Studies show that human parenting—whether maternal or paternal—is underpinned by a shared cortico‑limbic “parental caregiving” network whose activity is shaped by hormonal signals and caregiving experience.

According to professor Dacher Keltner, parental love manifests differently in fathers and mothers, with mothers scoring higher on measures of empathy, compassion, and love. However, the difference is not large, and there is no biological imperative that determines that women are the primary caregivers of children.

== See also ==
- Attachment theory
- Child development
- Family therapy
- Familial love
- Maternal bond
- Parental care
- Paternal bond
