= The Four Loves =

1960 book by C. S. Lewis

- First edition
- Author: C. S. Lewis
- Cover artist: Michael Harvey
- Language: English
- Genre: Philosophy
- Publisher: Geoffrey Bles
- Publication date: 1960
- Publication place: Northern Ireland
- Media type: Print (Hardback & Paperback)
- Pages: 160
- OCLC: 30879763

The Four Loves is a 1960 book by C. S. Lewis which explores the nature of love from a Christian and philosophical perspective through thought experiments. The book was based on a set of radio talks from 1958, which were criticised in the U.S. at the time for Lewis' frankness about sex during his discussion of eros.

== Need-love and Gift-love ==
In the introduction, Lewis initially contrasts between just two more basic types of love:

Need-love
such as the love which sends a child to its mother's arms when lonely or frightened.
Gift-love
such as a man's work for his family, and epitomized by God's love for humanity.

Lewis initially intended to disparage the former (Need-love). Taking his start from St. John's words "God is Love", Lewis believed that a plain distinction would be to say that human love only deserves to be called "love" insofar as it resembles "that Love which is God". Lewis, however, goes on to reject the notion that Need-love should not be called "love". Despite admitting that one finds oneself in a "deplorable state" when "love" only means a craving to be loved, Lewis says that "we do violence to most languages, including our own, if we do not call Need-love 'love'".

According to Lewis' analysis, the natures of these basic categorizations of love are more complicated than they first seem: a child's need for parental comfort is a necessity, not a selfish indulgence, while conversely, parental Gift-love in excessive form can become a perversion of its own. A Christian's love of God is primarily a Need-love, and actually coincides with man's healthiest spiritual condition, according to Lewis; attempting Gift-love for God would pale in comparison to God's graces.

== Pleasures ==
Lewis continues his examination by drawing a distinction between two types of "pleasures": (Note: Lewis does not use a hyphen when writing "Appreciative pleasure" and "Appreciative love".)

Need-pleasures
such as thirst, which "die on us" once sated.
Pleasures of Appreciation
such as a pleasant sensory experience of nature.

Need-pleasures tend to be spoken of in the past-tense; Appreciative pleasures are more present-tense. A thirsty man or alcoholic might say "by Jove, I wanted that", whereas the smell of sweet peas in the morning might prompt one to say "how lovely the smell is". Addiction may turn what was once Appreciative pleasure into Need-pleasure. An alcoholic may even garner no pleasure from having a drink beyond relief from unbearable craving.

With the introduction of appreciative pleasures, Lewis identifies a deficiency in his earlier love classification (Need vs. Gift), and derives a third element of love:

Appreciative love
an admiration or worship, which rejoices that such a loved one would exist, regardless if he or she would be lost or intended for somebody else.

== The four loves ==
=== Affection ===
Storge (storgē, Greek: στοργή) is liking someone through the fondness of familiarity, family members or people who relate in familiar ways that have otherwise found themselves bonded by chance. An example is the natural love and affection of a parent for their child. It is described as the most natural, emotive, and widely diffused of loves: It is natural in that it is present without coercion, emotive because it is the result of fondness due to familiarity, and most widely diffused because it pays the least attention to those characteristics deemed "valuable" or worthy of love and, as a result, is able to transcend most discriminating factors. Lewis describes it as a dependency-based love which risks extinction if the needs cease to be met.

Affection, for Lewis, included both Need-love and Gift-love. He considered it responsible for nine-tenths of all solid and lasting human happiness.

However, affection's strength is also what makes it vulnerable. Affection has the appearance of being "built-in" or "ready made", says Lewis, and as a result, people come to expect it irrespective of their behaviour and its natural consequences. Both in its Need and its Gift form, affection then is liable to "go bad", and to be corrupted by such forces as jealousy, ambivalence and smothering.

=== Friendship ===
Philia (Greek: φιλία) is the love between friends as close as siblings in strength and duration. The friendship is the strong bond existing between people who share common values, interests, or activities. Lewis immediately differentiates friendship love from the other loves. He describes friendship as "the least biological, organic, instinctive, gregarious and necessary...the least natural of loves". Our species does not need friendship in order to reproduce, but to the classical and medieval worlds, it is a higher-level love because it is freely chosen.

Lewis explains that true friendships, like the friendship between David and Jonathan in the Bible, are almost a lost art. He expresses a strong distaste for the way modern society ignores friendship. He notes that he cannot remember any poem that celebrated true friendship like that between David and Jonathan, Orestes and Pylades, Roland and Oliver, Amis and Amiles. Lewis goes on to say, "to the Ancients, Friendship seemed the happiest and most fully human of all loves; the crown of life and the school of virtue. The modern world, in comparison, ignores it".

Growing out of companionship, friendship for Lewis was an appreciative love, though one which he felt few people in modern society could value at its worth, because so few actually experienced true friendship.

Nevertheless, Lewis was not blind to what he considered the dangers of friendships, such as its potential for cliquiness, anti-authoritarianism and pride.

=== Eros ===
Eros (erōs, Greek: ἔρως) for Lewis was love in the sense of "being in love" or "loving" someone, as opposed to the raw sexuality of what he called Venus: the illustration Lewis used was the distinction between "wanting a woman" and wanting one particular woman – something that matched his (classical) view of man as a rational animal, a composite both of reasoning angel and instinctual alley-cat.

Eros turns the need-pleasure of Venus into the most appreciative of all pleasures; but nevertheless, Lewis warned against the modern tendency for Eros to become a god to people who fully submit themselves to it, a justification for selfishness, even a phallic religion.

After exploring sexual activity and its spiritual significance in both a pagan and a Christian sense, he notes how Eros (or being in love) is in itself an indifferent, neutral force: how "Eros in all his splendour ... may urge to evil as well as good". While accepting that Eros can be an extremely profound experience, he does not overlook the dark way in which it could lead even to the point of suicide pacts or murder, as well as to furious refusals to part, "mercilessly chaining together two mutual tormentors, each raw all over with the poison of hate-in-love".

=== Charity ===
Charity (agápē, Greek: ἀγάπη) is the love that exists regardless of changing circumstances. Lewis recognizes this selfless love as the greatest of the four loves, and sees it as a specifically Christian virtue to achieve. The chapter on the subject focuses on the need to subordinate the other three natural loves – as Lewis puts it, "The natural loves are not self-sufficient" – to the love of God, who is full of charitable love, to prevent what he termed their "demonic" self-aggrandizement.

== See also ==
- Attachment theory – Psychological ethological theory
- Compassionate love – Love for the good of the other
- Colour wheel theory of love – Love typology by J. A. Lee
- Friendship – Mutual affection between people
- Greek words for love – Group of concepts in Ancient Greek philosophy
- Heterosociality – Socializing with the opposite sex
- Homosociality – Socializing with the same sex
- Inklings – Informal literary discussion group associated with the University of Oxford, England
- Romance – Love focused on feelings
- Passionate and companionate love – Two basic love feelings
- Platonic love – Non-sexual love
- Triangular theory of love – Psychological theory by Robert Sternberg
- Unconditional love – Concept of love without conditions
