= Agape =

Ancient Greek word for love

Agape (/ɑːˈɡɑːpeɪ, ˈɑːɡəˌpeɪ, ˈæɡə-/; from Ancient Greek ἀγάπη (agápē)) is "the love of God for [human beings] and of [human beings] for God". This is in contrast to philia, brotherly love, or philautia, self-love, as it embraces a profound sacrificial love that transcends and persists regardless of circumstance.

The verb form goes as far back as Homer, translated literally as affection, as in "greet with affection" and "show affection for the dead". Other ancient authors have used forms of the word to denote love of a spouse or family, or affection for a particular activity, in contrast to eros (an affection of a sexual nature).

In the New Testament, agape refers to the covenant love of God for humans, as well as the human reciprocal love for God; the term necessarily extends to the love of one's fellow human beings. Some contemporary writers have sought to extend the use of agape into non-religious contexts.

The concept of agape has been widely examined within its Christian context. It has also been considered in the contexts of other religions, religious ethics, and science.

== Early uses ==
Liddell–Scott–Jones (LSJ) Lexicon lists many instances of the word agape in polytheistic Greek literature. Three basic descriptions appear: (1) "greet with affection," (2) to be fond of, prize, desire," and (3) "to be well pleased, contented."LSJ Also, Bauer's Lexicon mentions a sepulchral inscription, most likely to honor a polytheistic army officer held in "high esteem" by his country.

== Christianity ==
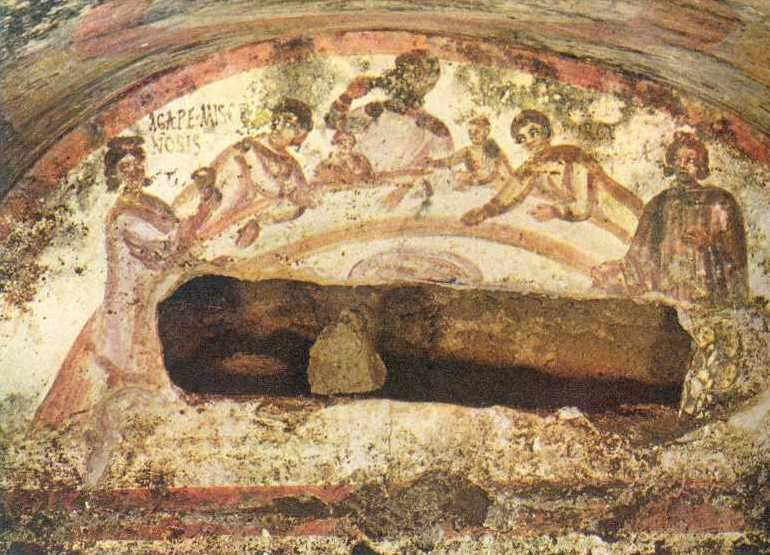
Fresco of a female figure holding a chalice at an early Christian Agape feast. Catacomb of Saints Marcellinus and Peter, Via Labicana, Rome.

The word agape received a broader usage under later Christian writers as the word that specifically denoted Christian love or charity (1 Corinthians 13:1–8), or even God himself. The expression "God is love" (ὁ θεὸς ἀγάπη ἐστίν) occurs twice in the New Testament: 1 John 4:8;16. Agape was also used by the early Christians to refer to the self-sacrificing love of God for humanity, which they were committed to reciprocating and practicing towards God and among one another (see kenosis). This understanding is built upon the foundational Hebrew concept of chesed, or the loving kindness of God, which is taught throughout the Old Testament.

Agape has been expounded by many Christian writers in a specifically Christian context. C. S. Lewis uses agape in The Four Loves to describe what he believes is the highest variety of love known to humanity: a selfless love that is passionately committed to the well-being of others.

The Christian use of the term comes directly from the canonical Gospels' accounts of the teachings of Jesus. When asked what was the great commandment, "Jesus said unto him, Thou shalt love the Lord thy God with all thy heart, and with all thy soul, and with all thy mind. This is the first and great commandment. And the second is like unto it, Thou shalt love thy neighbour as thyself. On these two commandments hang all the law and the prophets." (Matthew 22:37–40) In Judaism, the first "love the LORD thy God" is part of the Shema (Deuteronomy 6:5), while the second "love thy neighbour as thyself" is a commandment from Leviticus 19:18.

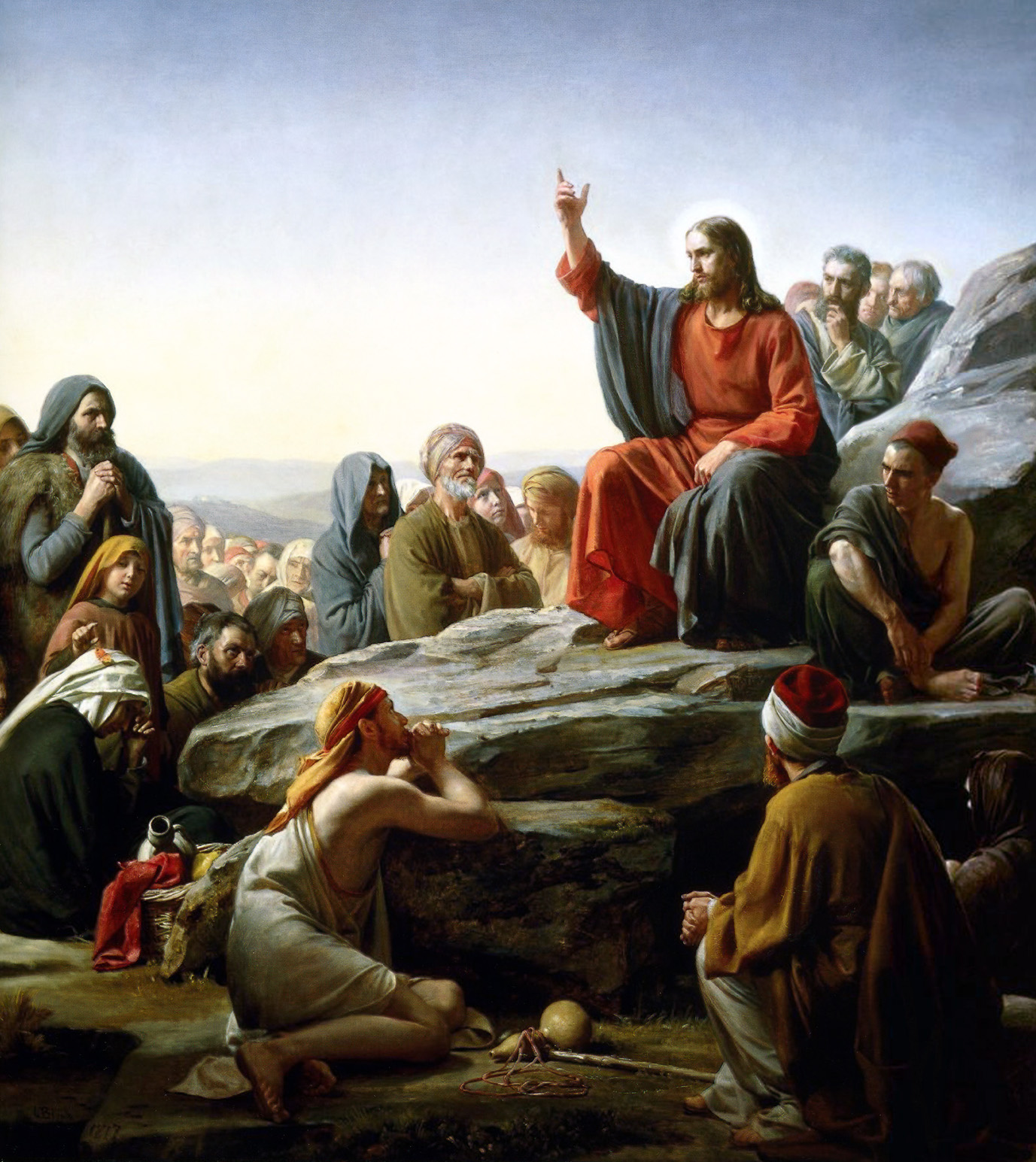
The Sermon on the Mount, Carl Bloch, 1877

In the Sermon on the Mount, Jesus said:

You have heard that it was said, 'You shall love (agapēseis) your neighbor and hate your enemy.' But I say to you, Love (agapāte) your enemies and pray for those who persecute you, so that you may be sons of your Father who is in heaven; for he makes his sun rise on the evil and on the good, and sends rain on the just and on the unjust. For if you love those who love you, what reward have you?

— Matthew 5:43–46, RSV

Tertullian remarks in his 2nd century defense of Christians that Christian love attracted pagan notice: "What marks us in the eyes of our enemies is our loving kindness. 'Only look,' they say, 'look how they love one another'" (Apology 39).

Anglican theologian O. C. Quick writes that agape within human experience is "a very partial and rudimentary realization," and that "in its pure form it is essentially divine."

If we could imagine the love of one who loves men purely for their own sake, and not because of any need or desire of his own, purely desires their good, and yet loves them wholly, not for what at this moment they are, but for what he knows he can make of them because he made them, then we should have in our minds some true image of the love of the Father and Creator of mankind.

In the New Testament, the word agape is often used to describe God's love. However, other forms of the word are used in an accusatory context, such as the various forms of the verb agapaō. Examples include:

- 2 Timothy 4:10— "for Demas hath forsaken me, having loved [agapēsas] this present world...".
- John 12:43— "For they loved [ēgapēsan] the praise of men more than the praise of God."
- John 3:19— "And this is the condemnation, that light is come into the world, and men loved [ēgapēsan] darkness rather than light, because their deeds were evil."

Karl Barth distinguishes agape from eros on the basis of its origin and depth of devotion without want. With agape, humanity does not merely express its nature, but transcends it. Agape identifies with the interests of the neighbor "in utter independence of the question of his attractiveness" and with no expectation of reciprocity.

=== Meal ===
The word agape is used in its plural form (agapai) in the New Testament to describe a meal or feast eaten by early Christians, as in Jude 1:12 and 2nd Peter 2:13. The agape love feast is still observed by many Christian denominations today, especially among Brethren and other Plain, Anabaptist churches. For example, among the Old Order River Brethren and Old Brethren, a weekend is still set aside twice a year for special meetings, self examination and a communal Love Feast as part of their three-part Communion observance.

== Thelema ==
In Thelema, a new religious movement developed by Aleister Crowley in the early 20th century, the term agape holds significant importance. Derived from Greek, agape traditionally denotes a selfless, unconditional love. In Thelemic practice, agape represents the highest form of love and is often associated with True Will and the central tenet of the religion: "Do what thou wilt shall be the whole of the Law. Love is the law, love under will." Within this context, agape is seen as the expression of one's divine will and the harmony of individual purpose with universal love. It encompasses both love for others and the self, transcending personal desires and attachments. In Thelemic rituals, the term is invoked to cultivate a sense of unity, compassion, and spiritual connection among practitioners. From an early age, Crowley rejected the New Testament understanding of agape love as expressed by Jesus Christ in John chapters 13 and 15, along with almost all other Christian tenets.

== See also ==
- Bodhicitta – Concept in Buddhism
- Greek words for love – Group of concepts in Ancient Greek philosophy
- Love styles – Love typology by J. A. Lee
- Dveikut – Jewish concept referring to closeness to God
- Mettā – Buddhist term meaning "loving-kindness"
- Ren – Highest Confucian virtue
- Ubuntu – Southern African philosophy
