= Philia =

Affection; one of the ancient Greek forms of love

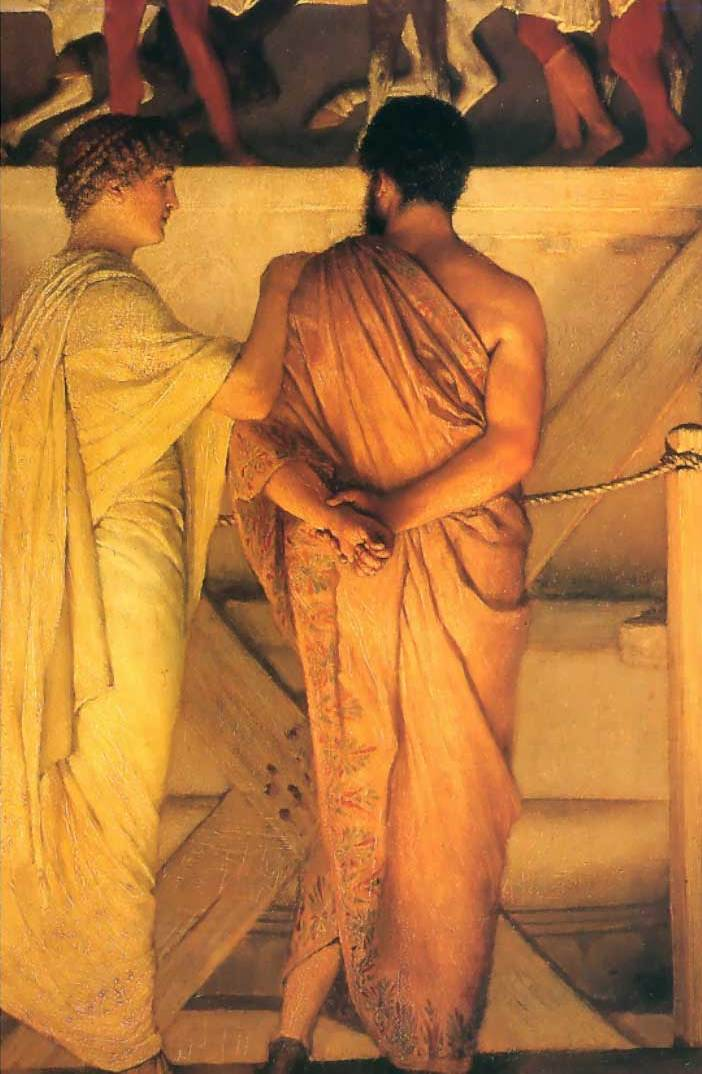
Detail from Phidias Showing the Frieze of the Parthenon to His Friends by Lawrence Alma-Tadema (1868)

Philia (/ˈfɪliə/; from Ancient Greek φιλία (philía)) is one of the several ancient Greek words for love, alongside storge, agape and eros. In Aristotle's Nicomachean Ethics, philia is commonly translated as friendship or affection. Its conceptual opposite is phobia, which denotes fear or aversion.

== Aristotle's view ==
As Gerard Hughes points out, in Books VIII and IX of his Nicomachean Ethics Aristotle gives examples of philia including:

young lovers (1156b2), lifelong friends (1156b12), cities with one another (1157a26), political or business contacts (1158a28), parents and children (1158b20), fellow-voyagers and fellow-soldiers (1159b28), members of the same religious society (1160a19), or of the same tribe (1161b14), a cobbler and the person who buys from him. (1163b35)

All of these different relationships involve getting on well with someone, though Aristotle at times implies that something more like actual liking is required. When he is talking about the character or disposition that falls between obsequiousness or flattery on the one hand and surliness or quarrelsomeness on the other, he says that this state:

has no name, but it would seem to be most like [philia]; for the character of the person in the intermediate state is just what we mean in speaking of a decent friend, except that the friend is also fond of us. (1126b21)

This passage indicates also that, though broad, the notion of philia must be mutual, and thus excludes relationships with inanimate objects, though philia with animals, such as pets, is allowed for (see 1155b27–31) though it considers its existence in the way of inanimate objects could also "inanimately love".

In his Rhetoric, Aristotle defines the activity involved in philia (τὸ φιλεῖν) as:

wanting for someone what one thinks good, for his sake and not for one's own, and being inclined, so far as one can, to do such things for him. (1380b36–1381a2)

John M. Cooper argues that this indicates:

that the central idea of φιλíα is that of doing well by someone for his own sake, out of concern for him (and not, or not merely, out of concern for oneself). [... Thus] the different forms of φιλíα [as listed above] could be viewed just as different contexts and circumstances in which this kind of mutual well-doing can arise.

Aristotle takes philia to be both necessary as a means to happiness ("no one would choose to live without friends even if he had all the other goods" [1155a5–6]) and noble or fine (καλόν) in itself.

== Types ==
Aristotle divides friendships into three types, based on the motive for forming them: friendships of utility, friendships of pleasure and friendships of the good.

Friendships of utility are relationships formed without regard to the other person at all. Buying merchandise, for example, may require meeting another person but usually needs only a very shallow relationship between the buyer and seller. In modern English, people in such a relationship would not even be called friends, but acquaintances (if they even remembered each other afterwards). The only reason these people are communicating is in order to buy or sell things, which is not a bad thing, but as soon as that motivation is gone, so goes the relationship between the two people unless another motivation is found. Complaints and quarrels generally only arise in this type of friendship.

At the next level, friendships of pleasure are based on pure delight in the company of other people. People who drink together or share a hobby may have such friendships. However, these friends may also part—in this case if they no longer enjoy the shared activity, or can no longer participate in it together.

Friendships of the good are ones where both friends enjoy each other's characters. As long as both friends keep similar characters, the relationship will endure since the motive behind it is care for the friend. This is the highest level of philia, and in modern English might be called true friendship.

Now it is possible for bad people as well [as good] to be friends to each other for pleasure or utility, for decent people to be friends to base people, and for someone with neither character to be a friend to someone with any character. Clearly, however, only good people can be friends to each other because of the other person himself; for bad people find no enjoyment in one another if they get no benefit. (1157a18–21)

Not all bonds of philia involves reciprocity Aristotle notes. Some examples of these might include love of father to son, elder to younger or ruler to subject. Generally though, the bonds of philia are reciprocal and even symmetrical.

== Self-sufficiency ==
Aristotle recognizes that there is an apparent conflict between what he says about philia and what he says elsewhere (and what is widely held at the time) about the self-sufficient nature of the fulfilled life:

it is said that the blessedly happy and self-sufficient people have no need of friends. For they already have [all] the goods, and hence, being self-sufficient, need nothing added. (1169b4–6)

He offers various answers. The first is based on the inherent goodness of acting for and being concerned for others ("the excellent person labours for his friends and for his native country, and will die for them if he must" [1169a19–20]); thus, being a wholly virtuous and fulfilled person necessarily involves having others for whom one is concerned—without them, one's life is incomplete:

the solitary person's life is hard, since it is not easy for him to be continuously active all by himself; but in relation to others and in their company it is easier. (1170a6–8)

Aristotle's second answer is: "good people's life together allows the cultivation of virtue" (1170a12). Finally, he argues that one's friend is "another oneself", and so the pleasure that the virtuous person gets from his own life is also found in the life of another virtuous person. "Anyone who is to be happy, then, must have excellent friends" (1170b19).

== Altruism and egoism ==
For Aristotle, in order to feel the highest form of philia for another, one must feel it for oneself; the object of philia is, after all, "another oneself". This alone does not commit Aristotle to egoism, of course. Not only is self-love not incompatible with love of others, but Aristotle is careful to distinguish the sort of self-love that is condemned (ascribed to "those who award the biggest share in money, honours, and bodily pleasures to themselves. For these are the goods desired and eagerly pursued by the many on the assumption that they are best" [1168b17–19]) from that which should be admired (ascribed to one who "is always eager above all to perform just or temperate actions or any other actions in accord with the virtues, and in general always gains for himself what is fine [noble, good]" [1168b25–27]). In fact:

The good person must be a self-lover, since he will both help himself and benefit others by performing fine actions. But the vicious person must not love himself, since he will harm both himself and his neighbours by following his base feelings. (1169a12–15)

Aristotle also holds, though, that, as Hughes puts it: "[t]he only ultimately justifiable reason for doing anything is that acting in that way will contribute to a fulfilled life." Thus acts of philia might seem to be essentially egoistic, performed apparently to help others, but in fact intended to increase the agent's happiness. This, however, confuses the nature of the action with its motivation; the good person doesn't perform an action to help a friend because it will give her fulfillment; she performs it in order to help the friend, and in performing it makes both her friend and herself happy. The action is thus good both in itself and for the effect it has on the agent's happiness.

== See also ==
- Blood brother
- Greek words for love
- Love
- Philotes
- Selfless service
