= Eros (concept) =

Ancient Greek word for being in love

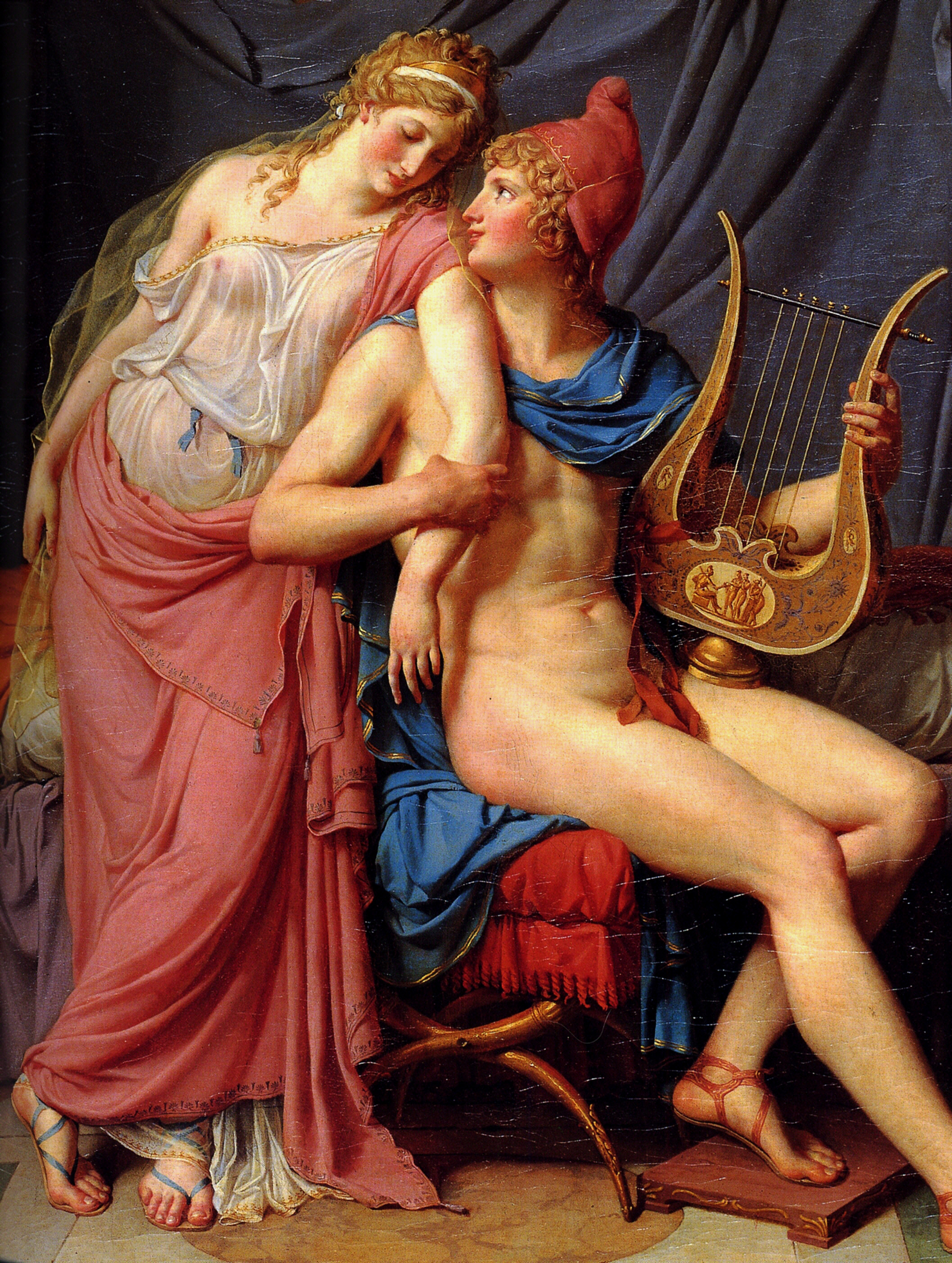
The Love of Helen and Paris by Jacques-Louis David (1788)

Eros (/ˈɪərɒs/, US: /ˈɛrɒs, irɒs, -oʊs/; from Ancient Greek ἔρως (érōs) 'love, desire') is an Ancient Greek word which referred to being in love. The term has been used in the philosophy of love to mean a Western tradition stemming from ancient Greek philosophy and literature, (e.g. ideas found in Plato's Symposium, or the poetry of Sappho), as well as modern psychology, where the term is related to romantic or passionate love. "Eros" is also the name of the Greek god of love, passion, and erotic desire, from which the term erotic is derived.

The British philosopher C. S. Lewis featured eros (to mean "being in love") in his book The Four Loves as a major type of love, alongside affection (storge), friendship (philia), and charity. The term was later borrowed by the Canadian sociologist John Alan Lee for his eros love style (a type of love story).

In psychoanalytic theory, eros is used in a more general way to mean a "life instinct", with evolutionary goals like survival and reproduction; however, in Sigmund Freud's writings, the term is most often used in reference to the sex drive.

== In literature ==
=== Classical Greek tradition ===
In the classical world, erotic love was described through an elaborate metaphoric and mythological schema involving "love's arrows" or "love darts", the source of which was often the personified figure of Eros (or his Latin counterpart, Cupid), or another deity (such as Rumor). At times the source of the arrows was said to be the image of the beautiful love object itself. If these arrows struck the lover's eyes, they would then travel to and 'pierce' or 'wound' their heart and overwhelm them with desire and longing (lovesickness). The image of the "arrow's wound" was sometimes used to create oxymorons and rhetorical antithesis concerning its pleasure and pain.

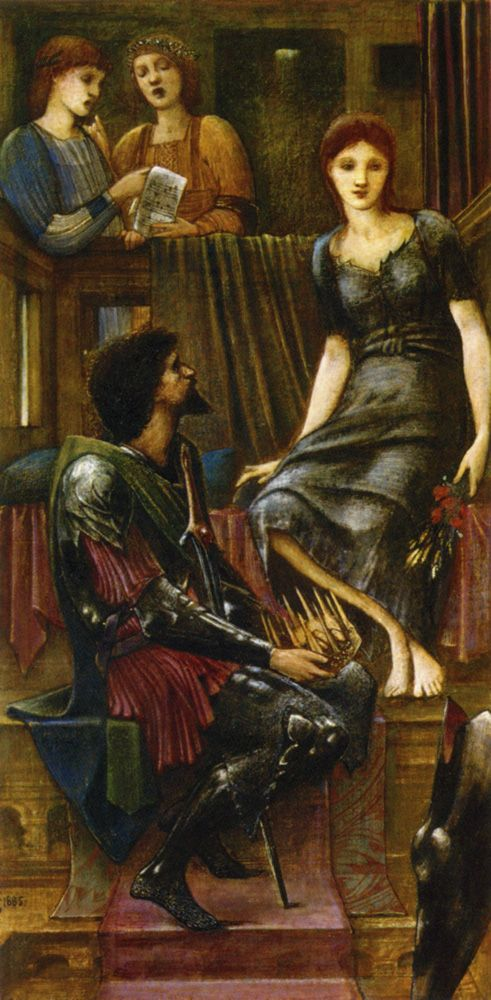
King Cophetua and the Beggar Maid, 1884, by Edward Burne-Jones, depicts an older tale of love at first sight.

"Love at first sight" was explained as a sudden beguiling of the lover through the action of these processes, but this was not the only mode of entering into passionate love in classical texts. At times the passion could occur after the initial meeting; for example, in Phaedra's letter to Hippolytus in Ovid's Heroides: "That time I went to Eleusis... it was then most of all (though you had pleased me before) that piercing love lodged in my deepest bones." At times, the passion could even precede the first glimpse, as in Paris' letter to Helen of Troy in the same work, where Paris says that his love for Helen came upon him before he had set eyes on her: "...you were my heart's desire before you were known to me. I beheld your features with my soul ere I saw them with my eyes; rumour, that told me of you, was the first to deal my wound."

Whether by "first sight" or by other routes, passionate love often had disastrous results according to the classical authors. In the event that the loved one was cruel or uninterested, this desire was shown to drive the lover into a state of depression, causing lamentation and illness. Occasionally, the loved one was depicted as an unwitting ensnarer of the lover, because of her sublime beauty—a "divine curse" which inspires men to kidnap her or try to rape her. Stories in which unwitting men catch sight of the naked body of Artemis the huntress (and sometimes Aphrodite) lead to similar ravages (as in the tale of Actaeon).

There are few written records of women's lives and loves in ancient Greece. Nevertheless, some historians have suggested that women may have been the objects of love more often than was previously believed and that men's love for women may have been an ideal. In ancient Athens the dominance of man in the marital relationship is expressed by figures such as the prominent Greek statesman and general Alcibiades. Another famous relationship between a man and a woman in ancient Athens was the romantic involvement of Aspasia with the statesman Pericles. In Sparta, the social status of women was stronger and the marital rituals were solemnized. There was an elaborate preparation for the first night after the marriage, while the man in a symbolic rite had to abduct his future wife before the official ceremony, while she had her hair cut short and dressed in boy's clothes. The ideal outcome of marital eros in Sparta was the birth of a healthy boy.

In The Symposium by Plato, Aristophanes relays a myth of the origin of both heterosexual and homosexual love. Eros paidikos, or pedagogic pederasty, was apparently known since 200 years before Plato. Originally, according to Aristophanes, each human being had two heads, four arms, and four legs, before Zeus decided to split every person in two. After everyone was split, each half searched for their other half, to make themselves whole again. Some people were originally half-male and half-female, and when Zeus split them they became men and women who sought opposite-sex partners. Some people were originally all-female, and they split into females who sought female partners. Some were all-male, and they split into males who sought other males.

=== Plato ===
The ancient Greek philosopher Plato developed an idealistic concept of eros which would prove to be very influential in modern times. In general, Plato did not consider physical attraction to be a necessary part of eros. According to Plato, eros could be diverted to philosophy (inclusive of mathematical, ethical and ascetical training), rather than dissipated in sexuality, for the purpose of using erotic energy as a vehicle for the transformation of consciousness, and union with the Divine. In Symposium, eros is described as a universal force that moves all things towards peace, perfection and divinity. Eros himself is a "daimon", namely a creature between divinity and mortality.

"Platonic love" in this original sense can be attained by the intellectual purification of eros from carnal into ideal form. Plato argues there that eros is initially felt for a person, but with contemplation it can become an appreciation for the beauty within that person, or even an appreciation for beauty itself in an ideal sense. As Plato expresses it, eros can help the soul to "remember" beauty in its pure form. It follows from this, for Plato, that eros can contribute to an understanding of truth.

Eros, understood in this sense, differed considerably from the common meaning of the word in the Greek language of Plato's time. It also differed from the meaning of the word in contemporary literature and poetry. For Plato, eros is neither purely human nor purely divine: it is something intermediate which he calls a daimon.

Its main characteristic is permanent aspiration and desire. Even when it seems to give, eros continues to be a "desire to possess", but nevertheless it is different from a purely sensual love in being the love that tends towards the sublime. According to Plato, the gods do not love, because they do not experience desires, inasmuch as their desires are all satisfied. They can thus only be an object, not a subject of love (Symposium 200-1). For this reason they do not have a direct relationship with man; it is only the mediation of eros that allows the connecting of a relationship (Symposium 203). Eros is thus the way that leads man to divinity, but not vice versa.

Paradoxically, for Plato, the object of eros does not have to be physically beautiful. This is because the object of eros is beauty, and the greatest beauty is eternal, whereas physical beauty is in no way eternal. However, if the lover achieves possession of the beloved's inner (i.e., ideal) beauty, his need for happiness will be fulfilled, because happiness is the experience of knowing that you are participating in the ideal.

=== European literature ===
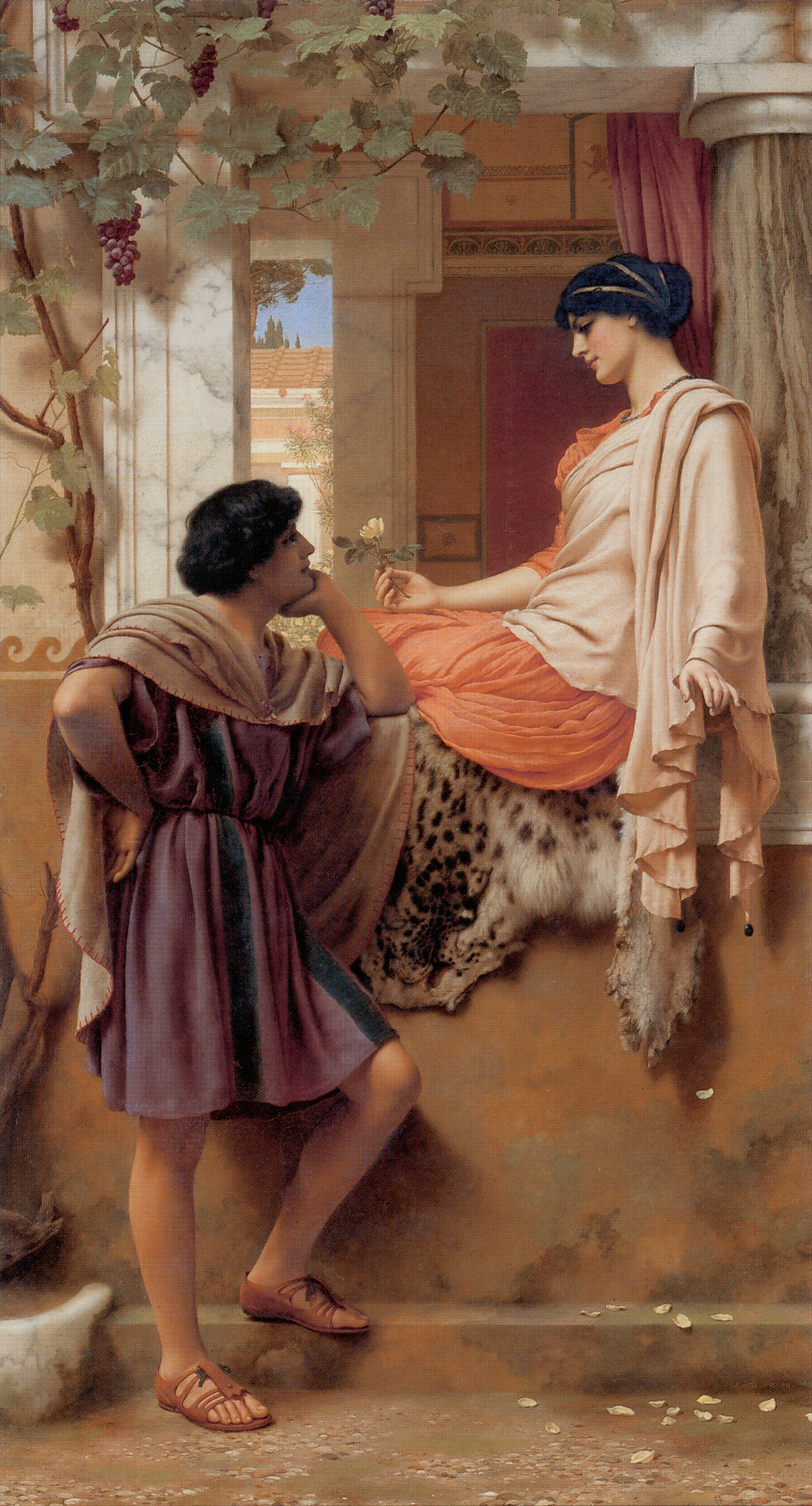
The Old, Old Story, John William Godward, 1903

The classical conception of love's arrows was developed further by the troubadour poets of Provence during the medieval period, and became part of the European courtly love tradition. The role of a woman's eyes in eliciting erotic desire was particularly emphasized by the Provençal poets, as N. E. Griffin states:

According to this description, love originates upon the eyes of the lady when encountered by those of her future lover. The love thus generated is conveyed on bright beams of light from her eyes to his, through which it passes to take up its abode in his heart.

In some medieval texts, the gaze of a beautiful woman is compared to the sight of a basilisk—a legendary reptile said to have the power to cause death with a single glance.

These images continued to be circulated and elaborated upon in the literature and iconography of the Renaissance and Baroque periods. Boccaccio for example, in his Il Filostrato, mixes the tradition of Cupid's arrow with the Provençal emphasis on the eyes as the birthplace of love: "Nor did he (Troilus) who was so wise shortly before... perceive that Love with his darts dwelt within the rays of those lovely eyes... nor notice the arrow that sped to his heart."

The rhetorical antithesis between the pleasure and pain from love's dart continued through the 17th century, as for example, in these classically inspired images from The Fairy-Queen:

If Love's a Sweet Passion, why does it torment?
If a Bitter, oh tell me whence comes my content?
Since I suffer with pleasure, why should I complain,
Or grieve at my Fate, when I know 'tis in vain?
Yet so pleasing the Pain is, so soft is the Dart,
That at once it both wounds me, and Tickles my Heart.

=== Roman Catholic teachings ===
Ancient Jewish tradition, Augustine of Hippo, and Bonaventure all have influence on Roman Catholic marital teachings regarding eros. In his first encyclical, Deus caritas est, Pope Benedict XVI discusses three of the four Greek relationship terms: eros, philia and agape, and contrasts between them. In agape, for Benedict, one gives of oneself to another; in eros, the self seeks to receive from another self; philia is the mutual love between friends. He explains that eros and agape are both inherently good, but that eros risks being downgraded to mere sex if it is not balanced by an element of spiritual Christianity.

== Modern psychologists ==
=== Freud ===
In Freudian psychology, eros, not to be confused with libido, is not exclusively the sex drive, but our life force, the will to live. It is the desire to create life, and favors productivity and construction. In early psychoanalytic writings, instincts from the eros were opposed by forces from the ego. But in later psychoanalytic theory, eros is opposed by the destructive death instinct of Thanatos (death instinct or death drive).

In his 1925 paper "The Resistances to Psycho-Analysis", Freud explains that the psychoanalytic concept of sexual energy is more in line with the Platonic view of eros, as expressed in the Symposium, than with the common use of the word "sex" as related primarily to genital activity. He also mentions the philosopher Schopenhauer as an influence. He then goes on to confront his adversaries for ignoring such great precursors and for tainting his whole theory of eros with a pansexual tendency. He finally writes that his theory naturally explains this collective misunderstanding as a predictable resistance to the acknowledgement of sexual activity in childhood.

However, F. M. Cornford finds the standpoints of Plato and of Sigmund Freud to be "diametrically opposed" with regard to eros. In Plato, eros is a spiritual energy initially, which then "falls" downward; whereas in Freud eros is a physical energy which is "sublimated" upward.

The philosopher and sociologist Herbert Marcuse appropriated the Freudian concept of eros for his highly influential 1955 work Eros and Civilization.

=== Jung ===
In Carl Jung's analytical psychology, the counterpart to eros is logos, a Greek term for the principle of rationality. Jung considers logos to be a masculine principle, while eros is a feminine principle. According to Jung:

Woman's psychology is founded on the principle of Eros, the great binder and loosener, whereas from ancient times the ruling principle ascribed to man is Logos. The concept of Eros could be expressed in modern terms as psychic relatedness, and that of Logos as objective interest.

This gendering of eros and logos is a consequence of Jung's theory of the anima/animus syzygy of the human psyche. Syzygy refers to the split between male and female. According to Jung, this split is recapitulated in the unconscious mind by means of "contrasexual" (opposite-gendered) elements called the anima (in men) and the animus (in women). Thus men have an unconscious feminine principle, the "anima", which is characterized by feminine eros. The work of individuation for men involves becoming conscious of the anima and learning to accept it as one's own, which entails accepting eros. This is necessary in order to see beyond the projections that initially blind the conscious ego. "Taking back the projections" is a major task in the work of individuation, which involves owning and subjectivizing unconscious forces which are initially regarded as alien.

In essence, Jung's concept of eros is not dissimilar to the Platonic one. Eros is ultimately the desire for wholeness, and although it may initially take the form of passionate love, it is more truly a desire for "psychic relatedness", a desire for interconnection and interaction with other sentient beings. However, Jung was inconsistent, and he did sometimes use the word "eros" as a shorthand to designate sexuality.

== See also ==
- Colour wheel theory of love
- The Four Loves
- Greek love
- Sisyphus
