= Affection =

Feeling or type of love

Two children showing affection

Affection or fondness is a "disposition or state of mind or body" commonly linked to a feeling or type of love. It has led to multiple branches in philosophy and psychology that discuss emotion, disease, influence, and state of being. Often, "affection" denotes more than mere goodwill or friendship. Writers on ethics generally use the word to refer to distinct states of feeling, both lasting and temporary. Some contrast it with passion as being free from the distinctively sensual element.

Affection can elicit diverse emotional reactions such as embarrassment, disgust, pleasure, and annoyance. The emotional and physical effect of affection also varies between the giver and the receiver.

== Restricted definition ==
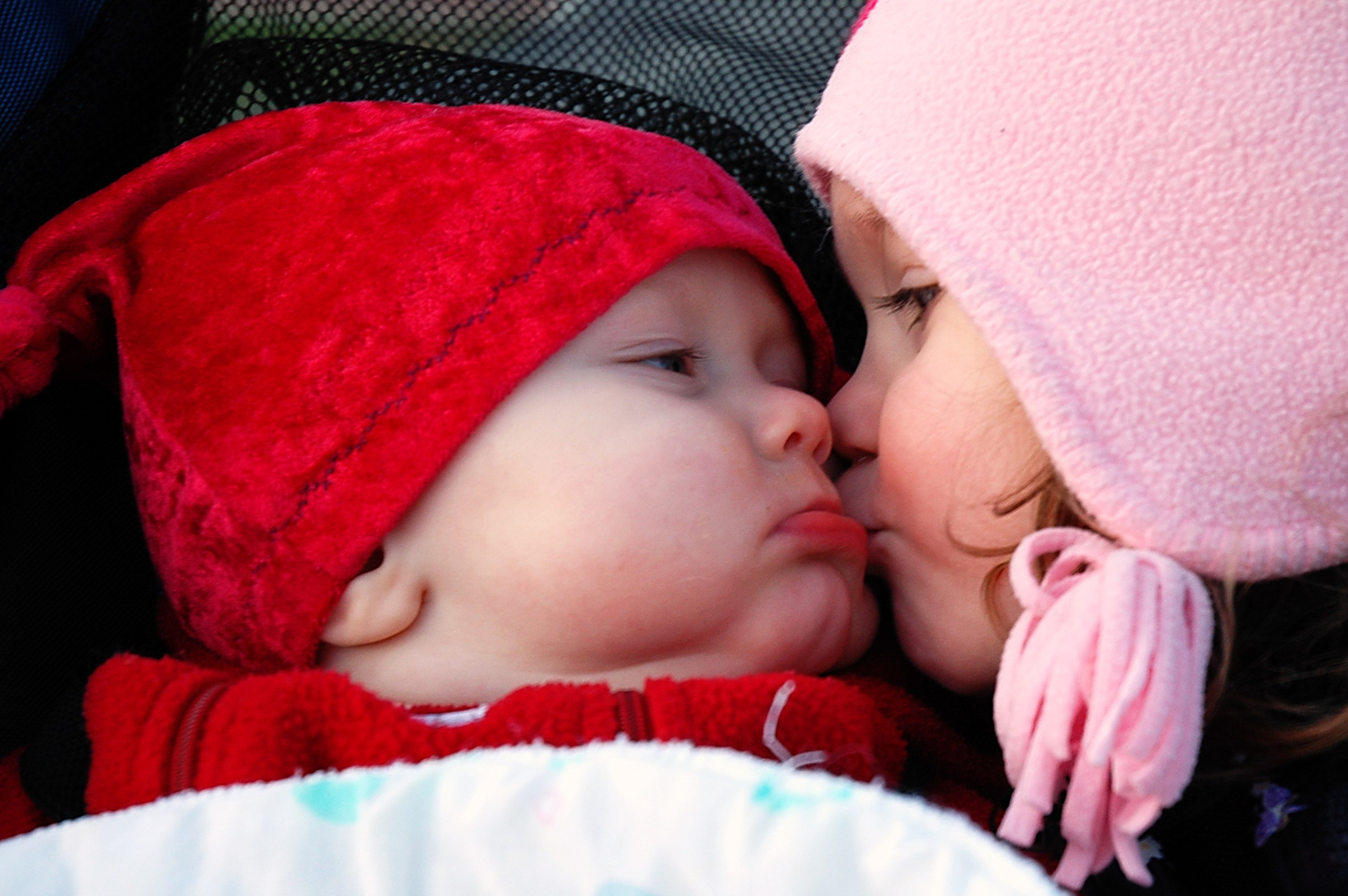
A young girl kisses a baby on the cheek.

Sometimes the term is restricted to emotional states directed towards living entities, including humans and animals. Affection is often compared with passion, stemming from the Greek word pathos. Consequently, references to affection are found in the works of philosophers such as René Descartes, Baruch Spinoza, and early British ethicists. Despite these associations, it is commonly differentiated from passion on various grounds. Some definitions of affection exclude feelings of anxiety or heightened excitement, elements typically linked to passion. In this narrower context, the term holds significance in ethical frameworks, particularly concerning social or parental affections, forming a facet of moral duties and virtue. Ethical perspectives may hinge on whether affection is perceived as voluntary.

== Expression ==
Affection can be communicated by looks, words, gestures, or touches. It conveys love and social connection. The five love languages explain how couples can communicate affections to each other. Affectionate behavior may have evolved from parental nurturing behavior due to its associations with hormonal rewards. Such affection has been shown to influence brain development in infants, especially their biochemical systems and prefrontal development.

Affectionate gestures can become undesirable if they insinuate potential harm to one's welfare. However, when welcomed, such behavior can offer several health benefits. Some theories suggest that positive sentiments enhance individuals' inclination to engage socially, and the sense of closeness fostered by affection contributes to nurturing positive sentiments among them.

=== Benefits of affection ===
Affection exchange is an adaptive human behavior that benefits well-being. Expressing affection brings emotional, physical, and relational gains for people and their close connections. Sharing positive emotions yields health advantages like reduced stress hormones, lower cholesterol, lower blood pressure, and a stronger immune system. Expressing affection, not merely feeling affection, is internally rewarding. Even if not reciprocated, givers still experience its effects.

=== Parental relationships ===
Affectionate behavior is frequently considered an outcome of parental nurturing, tied to hormonal rewards. Both positive and negative parental actions may have connections to health issues in later life. Neglect and abuse result in poorer well-being and mental health, contrasting with affection's positive effects. A 2013 study highlighted the impact of early child abuse and lack of affection on physical health.

== Affectionism ==
Affectionism is a school of thought that considers affections to be of central importance. Although it is not found in mainstream Western philosophy, it does exist in Indian philosophy.

== See also ==
- Affectional bond – Attachment behavior one person has for another
- Affectional orientation – Classification of a person's romantic attraction towards others
- Affective filter – Hypotheses of second-language acquisition
- Affective videogames – Emotion modeling in AI
- Attraction – Study of the attraction between people that leads to friendship or romance
- Crush – Feelings of romantic love felt by young people
- Doctrine of the affections – Theory in the aesthetics of painting, music, and theatre, widely used in the Baroque era
- Emotion – Conscious subjective experience
- The Four Loves – 1960 book by C. S. Lewis
- Hug – Form of endearment
- Infatuation – Intense, irrational attraction
- List of emotions – Contrast of one emotion from another
- Social connection – Term in psychology referring to the experience of feeling close and connected to others
- Terms of endearment – Phrase expressing affection
