= Heroic virtue =

Christian phrase of ethics, used by the Catholic Church

Heroic virtue is the translation of a phrase coined by Augustine of Hippo to describe the virtue of early Christian martyrs. The expression, which was extended to the holiness of the life of any candidate for beatification, is used by the Roman Catholic Church.

The Greek pagan term hero described a person with possibly superhuman abilities and great goodness. "[I]t connotes a degree of bravery, fame, and distinction which places a man high above his fellows". The term was later applied to other highly virtuous people who do extraordinary good works.

== In Catholicism ==
A person's heroic virtue is one of the requirements for their beatification. The view of the Catholic Church was explained in an article by Joseph Wilhelm in the 1910 Catholic Encyclopedia: Wilhelm explains that heroic virtue, as a concept within Christian ethics, is characterized by the embodiment of the cardinal and theological virtues. These virtues encompass faith, hope, and charity, with divine charity being paramount. Pope Benedict XVI explained that it does not mean that a person performs acts of holiness which "normal people do not dare to do", but they have lived a life in which "God's presence is revealed".

Faith, fundamental to the Christian ethos, bridges the connection to the divine. It initiates a supernatural life and is revealed through actions. Good works, including adhering to divine commands, prayer, Church devotion, the fear of God, the abhorrence of sin, penance for sins committed, and patience in adversity, illustrate faith's vitality. Such actions become heroic when sustained unwaveringly over time or in arduous conditions.

Hope, a firm trust in God's benevolence in providing eternal life, attains heroism through unswerving confidence in divine assistance amid life's challenges. Sacrificing worldly gains for heavenly fulfillment underscores the heroic aspect of hope.

Charity, an affectionate love for God, culminates in unity and participation in God's life (beatific vision). This love extends to neighbors, recognizing God's image in them. Serving others becomes akin to serving God. Christ's injunction to love God and neighbor underscores this virtue's significance.

Prudence, the ability to discern proper desires and actions, reaches heroism through divine guidance. Justice, granting each their due, is exemplified by acts like self-sacrifice and obedience. Fortitude, overcoming obstacles in fulfilling duty, achieves heroic heights when surmounting seemingly insurmountable challenges. Temperance, restraint against wrongful passions, encompasses such facets as propriety, modesty, abstinence, chastity, and sobriety.

Notably, every virtuous act reflects elements of all virtues, unified by divine inspiration.

In summary, heroic virtue is marked by the cardinal and theological virtues, encompassing faith's foundational role, hope's resilient trust, and divine charity's boundless love. Prudence, justice, fortitude, and temperance further contribute to the virtuous life. Virtuous acts, inspired by the divine, exhibit unity in their diverse expressions.
