= Hope =

Optimistic state of mind

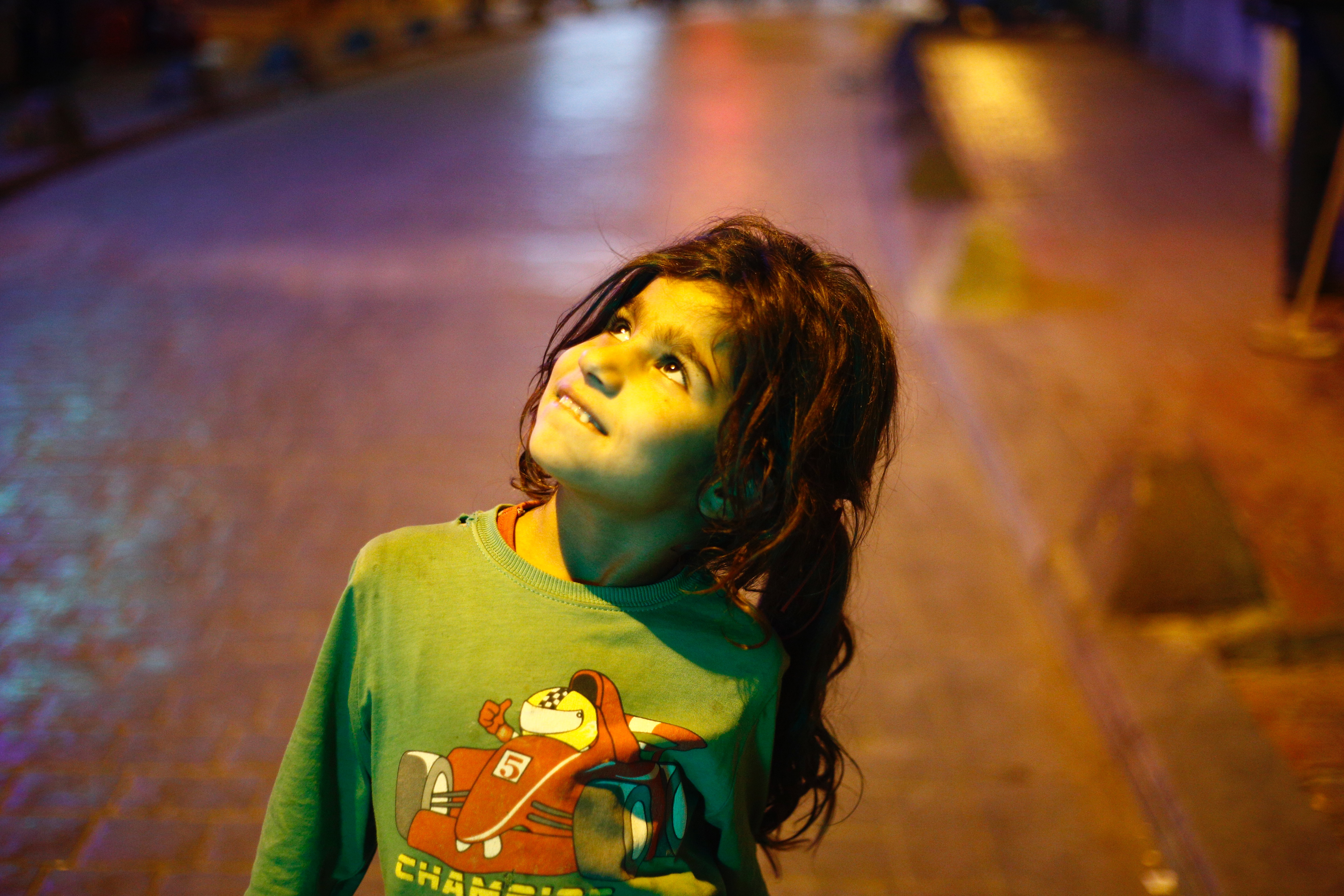
A girl with a hopeful expression

Hope is an optimistic state of mind that is based on an expectation of desirable outcomes with respect to events and circumstances in one's own life, or the world at large. As a verb, Merriam-Webster defines hope as "to expect with confidence" or "to cherish a desire with anticipation".

Among its opposites are dejection, hopelessness, and despair.

Hope finds expression through many dimensions of human life, including practical reasoning, the religious virtue of hope, legal doctrine, and literature, alongside cultural and mythological aspects.

== In psychology ==
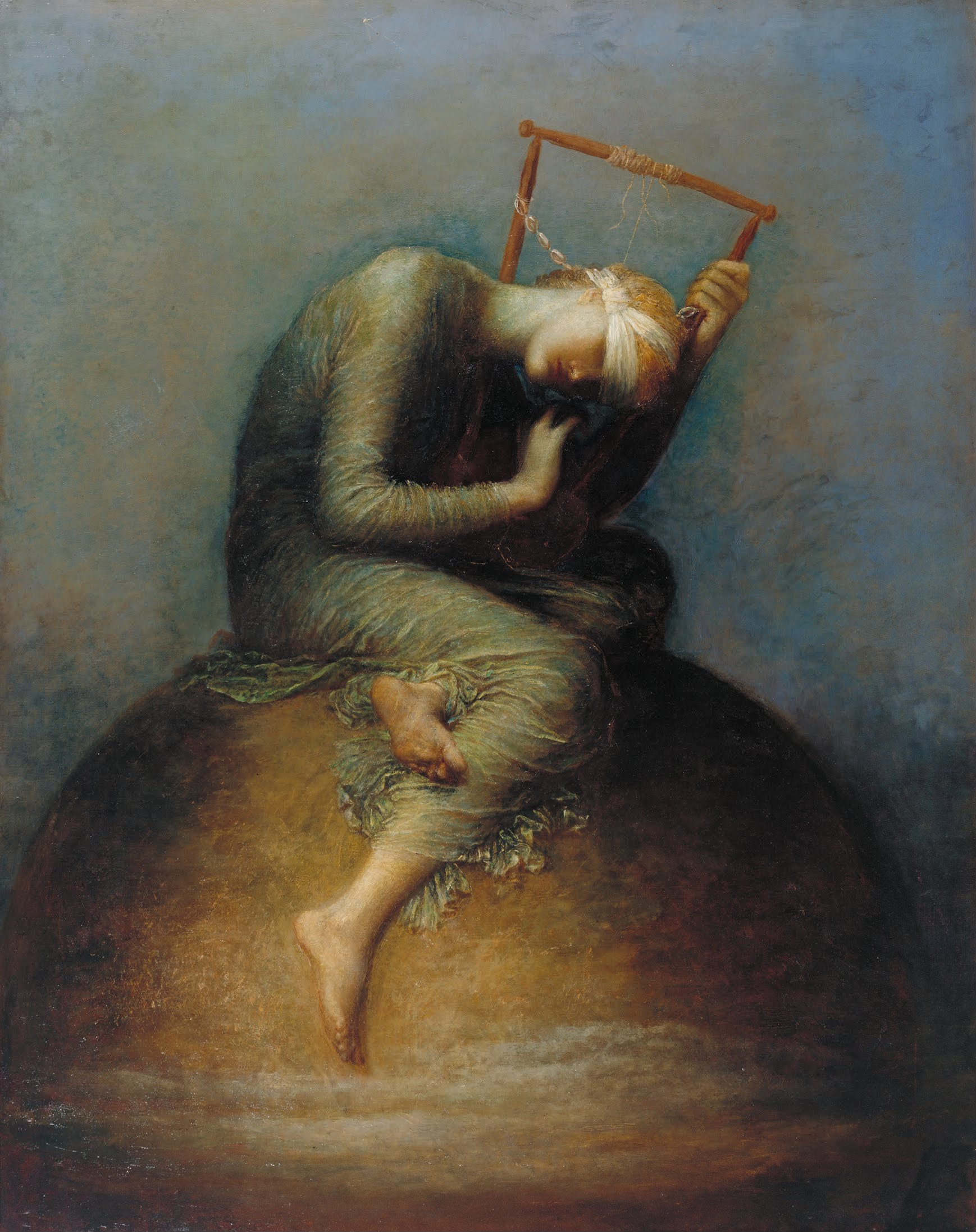
Hope, which lay at the bottom of the box, remained. Allegorical painting by George Frederic Watts, 1886

American professor of psychology Barbara Fredrickson argues that hope comes into its own when crisis looms, opening us to new creative possibilities. Frederickson argues that with great need comes an unusually wide range of ideas, as well as such positive emotions as happiness and joy, courage, and empowerment, drawn from four different areas of one's self: from a cognitive, psychological, social, or physical perspective. Such positive thinking bears fruit when based on a realistic sense of optimism, not on a naive "false hope".

The psychologist Charles R. Snyder linked hope to the existence of a goal, combined with a determined plan for reaching that goal. Alfred Adler had similarly argued for the centrality of goal-seeking in human psychology, as too had philosophical anthropologists like Ernst Bloch. Snyder also stressed the link between hope and mental willpower (hardiness), as well as the need for realistic perception of goals (problem orientation), arguing that the difference between hope and optimism was that the former can look like wishful thinking but the latter provides the energy to find practical pathways for an improved future. D. W. Winnicott saw a child's antisocial behavior as expressing as a cry for help, an unconscious hope, meaning an unspoken desire for a positive outcome for those who are in control in the wider society, when containment within the immediate family had failed. Object relations theory similarly sees the analytic transference as motivated in part by an unconscious hope that past conflicts and traumas can be dealt with anew.

=== Hope Theory ===
As a specialist in positive psychology, Snyder studied how hope and forgiveness can impact several aspects of life such as health, work, education, and personal meaning. He postulated that three main things make up hopeful thinking:

- Goals – Approaching life in a goal-oriented way.
- Pathways – Finding different ways to achieve your goals.
- Agency – Believing that you can instigate change and achieve these goals.

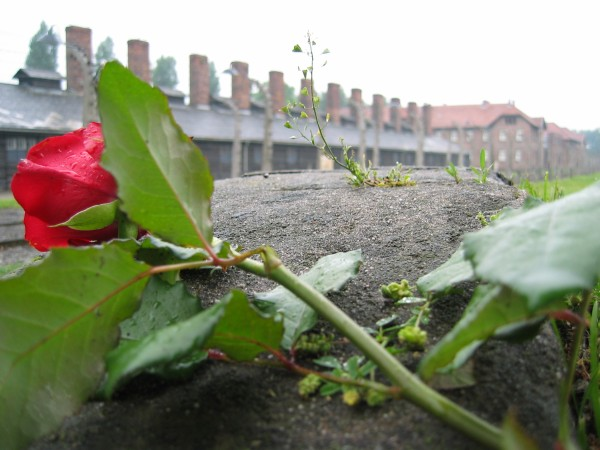
A rose expressing hope, at Auschwitz concentration camp

In other words, hope was defined as the perceived capability to derive pathways to desired goals and motivate oneself via agency thinking to use those pathways.

Snyder argues that individuals who are able to realize these three components and develop a belief in their ability are hopeful people who can establish clear goals, imagine multiple workable pathways toward those goals, and persevere, even when obstacles get in their way.

Snyder proposed a "Hope Scale" which considered that a person's determination to achieve their goal is their measured hope. Snyder differentiates between adult-measured hope and child-measured hope. The Adult Hope Scale by Snyder contains 12 questions: 4 measuring 'pathways thinking', 4 measuring 'agency thinking', and 4 that are simply fillers. Each subject responds to each question using an 8-point scale. Fibel and Hale measure hope by combining Snyder's Hope Scale with their own Generalized Expectancy for Success Scale (GESS) to empirically measure hope. Snyder regarded that psychotherapy can help focus attention on one's goals, drawing on tacit knowledge of how to reach them. Similarly, there is an outlook and a grasp of reality to hope, distinguishing No Hope, Lost Hope, False Hope and Real Hope, which differ in terms of viewpoint and realism.

Hopeful	Outlook	Wishful	Committed
Hopeful	Outlook	Hopeful Outlook; Distorted Reality; False Hope	Hopeful Outlook; Accurate Reality; Real Hope
Skeptical	Outlook	No Hope; Hopeless Outlook; Distorted Reality	Lost Hope; Hopeless Outlook; Accurate Reality
Hopeless	Outlook	Helpless	Surrendered
		Grasp of Reality	
		Uninformed; Distorted; Denied	Informed; Accurate; Assimilated

Contemporary philosopher Richard Rorty understands hope as more than goal setting, rather as a metanarrative, a story that serves as a promise or reason for expecting a better future. Rorty as postmodernist believes past meta-narratives, including the Christian story, utilitarianism, and Marxism have proved false hopes; that theory cannot offer social hope; and that liberal man must learn to live without a consensual theory of social hope. Rorty says a new document of promise is needed for social hope to exist again.

== In healthcare ==
=== Major theories ===
Of the countless models that examine the importance of hope in an individual's life, two major theories have gained a significant amount of recognition in the field of psychology. One of these theories, developed by Charles R. Snyder, argues that hope should be viewed as a cognitive skill that demonstrates an individual's ability to maintain drive in the pursuit of a particular goal. This model reasons that an individual's ability to be hopeful depends on two types of thinking: agency thinking and pathway thinking. Agency thinking refers to an individual's determination to achieve their goals despite possible obstacles, while pathway thinking refers to the ways in which an individual believes they can achieve these personal goals.

Snyder's theory uses hope as a mechanism that is most often seen in psychotherapy. In these instances, the therapist helps their client overcome barriers that have prevented them from achieving goals. The therapist would then help the client set realistic and relevant personal goals (i.e. "I am going to find something I am passionate about and that makes me feel good about myself"), and would help them remain hopeful of their ability to achieve these goals, and suggest the correct pathways to do so.

Whereas Snyder's theory focuses on hope as a mechanism to overcome an individual's lack of motivation to achieve goals, the other major theory developed by Kaye A. Herth deals more specifically with an individual's future goals as they relate to coping with illnesses. Herth views hope as "a motivational and cognitive attribute that is theoretically necessary to initiate and sustain action toward goal attainment". Establishing realistic and attainable goals in this situation is more difficult, as the individual most likely does not have direct control over the future of their health. Instead, Herth suggests that the goals should be concerned with how the individual is going to personally deal with the illness—"Instead of drinking to ease the pain of my illness, I am going to surround myself with friends and family".

While the nature of the goals in Snyder's model differ with those in Herth's model, they both view hope as a way to maintain personal motivation, which ultimately will result in a greater sense of optimism.

=== Major empirical findings ===
Hope, and more specifically, particularized hope, has been shown to be an important part of the recovery process from illness; it has strong psychological benefits for patients, helping them to cope more effectively with their disease. For example, hope motivates people to pursue healthy behaviors for recovery, such as eating fruits and vegetables, quitting smoking, and engaging in regular physical activity. This not only helps to enhance people's recovery from illnesses but also helps prevent illness from developing in the first place. Patients who maintain high levels of hope have an improved prognosis for life-threatening illness and an enhanced quality of life. Belief and expectation, which are key elements of hope, block pain in patients suffering from chronic illness by releasing endorphins and mimicking the effects of morphine. Consequently, through this process, belief and expectation can set off a chain reaction in the body that can make recovery from chronic illness more likely. This chain reaction is especially evident with studies demonstrating the placebo effect, a situation when hope is the only variable aiding in these patients' recovery.

Overall, studies have demonstrated that maintaining a sense of hope during a period of recovery from illness is beneficial. A sense of hopelessness during the recovery period has, in many instances, resulted in adverse health conditions for the patient (i.e. depression and anxiety following the recovery process). Additionally, having a greater amount of hope before and during cognitive therapy has led to decreased PTSD-related depression symptoms in war veterans. Hope has also been found to be associated with more positive perceptions of subjective health. However, reviews of research literature have noted that the connections between hope and symptom severity in other mental health disorders are less clear, such as in cases of individuals with schizophrenia.

Researchers have studied hope as a factor that may help individuals cope with serious and terminal illnesses. Hope theory focuses on goal-directed thinking, which involves setting meaningful goals and identifying ways to achieve them. For individuals with terminal illnesses, this type of thinking may support psychological adjustment and help them cope with difficult circumstances.

Hope is a powerful emotion that drives us to keep working and moving forward. It gives us the power to survive. In a study conducted by Harvard, Curt Richter experimented with 12 wild rats and 12 domesticated rats. The wild rats, known for their great swimming abilities, survived for only about two minutes when placed in a glass container of water with no way of escape. In contrast, the domesticated rats survived for days. Curt attributed this difference to hope. The domesticated rats hoped to be saved from drowning, but the wild rats had no such hope, as they had never experienced rescue.

Curt decided to run another experiment with 12 wild rats. He placed them in water, and when they were about to drown, he took them out and held them briefly, creating an experience of hope. He then returned the rats to the water to observe how long they would tread water. They survived just as long as the domesticated rats—about 60 hours. With hope, the rats went from surviving for 2 minutes to treading water for 60 hours. The rats had hope that a saving hand would come and lift them out of the water, hence the difference in experimental results.

=== Applications ===
The inclusion of hope in treatment programs has potential in both physical and mental health settings. Hope as a mechanism for improved treatment has been studied in the contexts of PTSD, chronic physical illness, and terminal illness, among other disorders and ailments. Within mental health practice, clinicians have suggested using hope interventions as a supplement to more traditional cognitive behavioral therapies. In terms of support for physical illness, research suggests that hope can encourage the release of endorphins and enkephalins, which help to block pain.

=== Impediments ===
There are two main arguments based on judgment against those who are advocates of using hope to help treat severe illnesses. The first of which is that if physicians have too much hope, they may aggressively treat the patient. The physician will hold on to a small shred of hope that the patient may get better. Thus, this causes them to try methods that are costly and may have many side effects. One physician noted that she regretted having hope for her patient; it resulted in her patient suffering through three more years of pain that the patient would not have endured if the physician had realized recovery was unfeasible.

The second argument is the division between hope and wishing. Those that are hopeful are actively trying to investigate the best path of action while taking into consideration the obstacles. Research has shown though that many of those who have "hope" are wishfully thinking and passively going through the motions, as if they are in denial about their actual circumstances. Being in denial and having too much hope may negatively impact both the patient and the physician.

=== Benefits ===
The impact that hope can have on a patient's recovery process is strongly supported through both empirical research and theoretical approaches. However, reviews of literature also maintain that more longitudinal and methodologically sound research is needed to establish which hope interventions are actually the most effective, and in what setting (i.e. chronic illness vs. terminal illness).

== In culture ==
In the matter of globalization, hope is focused on economic and social empowerment.

Focusing on parts of Asia, hope has taken on a secular or materialistic form in relation to the pursuit of economic growth. Primary examples are the rise of the economies of China and India, correlating with the notion of Chindia. A secondary relevant example is the increased use of contemporary architecture in rising economies, such as the building of the Shanghai World Financial Center, Burj Khalifa and Taipei 101, which has given rise to a prevailing hope within the countries of origin. In chaotic environments hope is transcended without cultural boundaries, Syrian refugee children are supported by UNESCO's education project through creative education and psycho-social assistance. Other inter-cultural support for instilling hope involve food culture, disengaging refugees from trauma through immersing them in their rich cultural past.

== In literature ==
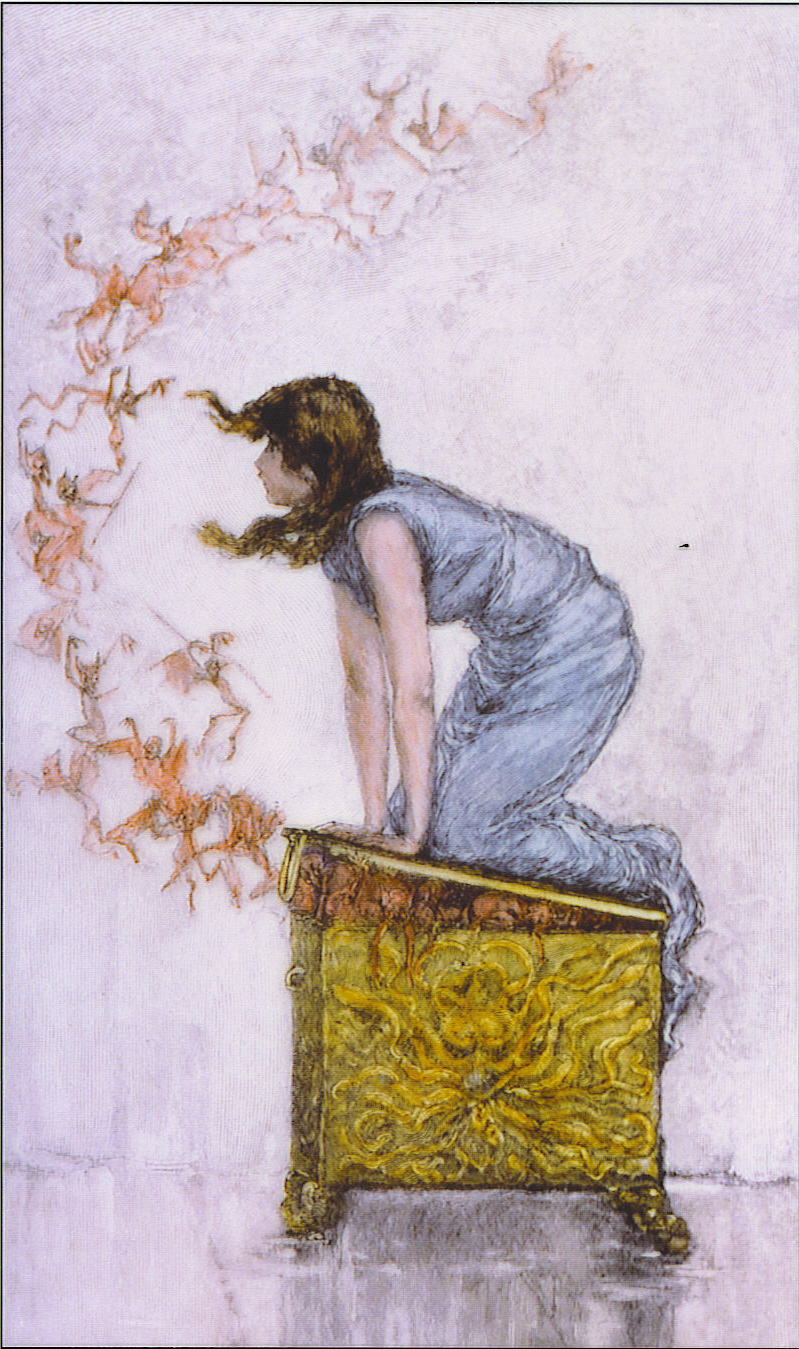
Engraving of Pandora trying to close the box that she had opened out of curiosity. At left, the evils of the world taunt her as they escape. The engraving is based on a painting by F. S. Church.

Hope is the thing with feathers that perches in the soul and sings the tune without the words and never stops at all.

— Emily Dickinson

A classic reference to hope which has entered modern language is the concept that "Hope springs eternal" taken from Alexander Pope's Essay on Man, the phrase reading "Hope springs eternal in the human breast, Man never is, but always to be blest:" Another popular reference, "Hope is the thing with feathers," is from a poem by Emily Dickinson.

Hope can be used as an artistic plot device and is often a motivating force for change in dynamic characters. A commonly understood reference from western popular culture is the subtitle "A New Hope" from the original first installment (now considered Episode IV) in the Star Wars science fiction space opera. The subtitle refers to one of the lead characters, Luke Skywalker, who is expected in the future to allow good to triumph over evil within the plot of the films.

The swallow has been a symbol of hope, in Aesop's fables and numerous other historic literature. It symbolizes hope, in part because it is among the first birds to appear at the end of winter and the start of spring. Other symbols of hope include the anchor and the dove.

Nietzsche took a contrarian but coherent view of hope:-

... Zeus did not wish man, however much he might be tormented by the other evils, to fling away his life, but to go on letting himself be tormented again and again. Therefore he gives Man hope,—in reality it is the worst of all evils, because it prolongs the torments of Man.

— Friedrich Nietzsche

== In mythology ==
Elpis (Hope) appears in ancient Greek mythology with the story of Zeus and Prometheus. Prometheus stole fire from the god Zeus, which infuriated the supreme god. In turn, Zeus created a box that contained all manners of evil, unbeknownst to the receiver of the box. Pandora opened the box after being warned not to, and unleashed a multitude of harmful spirits that inflicted plagues, diseases, and illnesses on mankind. Spirits of greed, envy, hatred, mistrust, sorrow, anger, revenge, lust, and despair scattered far and wide looking for humans to torment. Inside the box, however, there was also an unreleased healing spirit named Hope. From ancient times, people have recognized that a spirit of hope had the power to heal afflictions and helps them bear times of great suffering, illnesses, disasters, loss, and pain caused by the malevolent spirits and events. In Hesiod's Works and Days, the personification of hope is named Elpis.

Norse mythology however considered Hope (Vön) to be the slobber dripping from the mouth of Fenris Wolf: their concept of courage rated most highly a cheerful bravery in the absence of hope.

== In religion ==
Hope is a key concept in most major world religions, often signifying the "hoper" believes an individual or a collective group will reach a concept of heaven. Depending on the religion, hope can be seen as a prerequisite for and/or byproduct of spiritual attainment.

=== Judaism ===
The Jewish Encyclopedia notes "tiḳwah" (תקווה) and "seber" as terms for hope, adding that "miḳweh" and "kislah" denote the related concept of "trust" and that "toḥelet" signifies "expectation".

=== Christianity ===
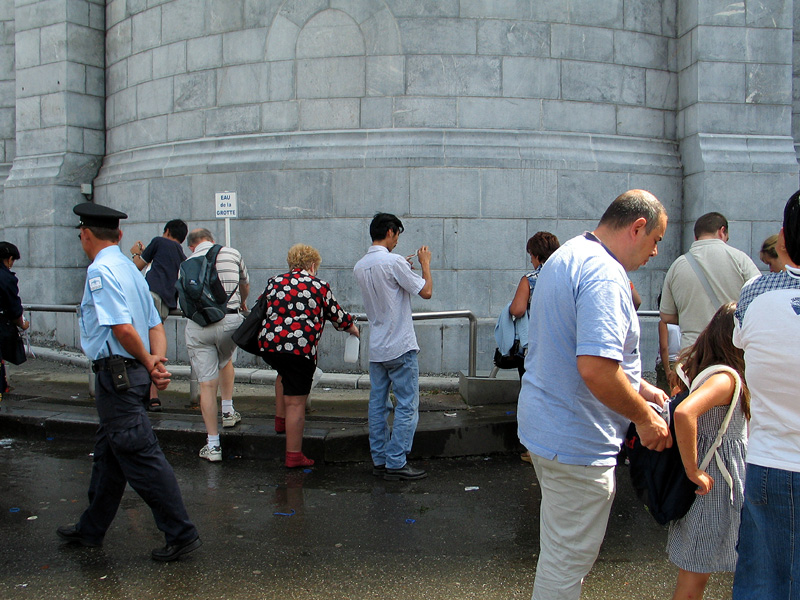
People collecting the miraculous water in Lourdes, France

Hope is one of the three theological virtues of the Christian religion, alongside faith and love. "Hope" in the Holy Bible means "a strong and confident expectation" of future reward (see Titus 1:2). In modern terms, hope is akin to trust and a confident expectation". Paul the Apostle argued that Christ was a source of hope for Christians: "For in this hope we have been saved" (see Romans 8:24). Paul the Apostle talks about the character of hope being "the assurance of things hoped for, the conviction of things not seen." (see Hebrews 11:1).

According to the Holman Bible Dictionary, hope is a "trustful expectation...the anticipation of a favorable outcome under God's guidance." In The Pilgrim's Progress, it is Hopeful who comforts Christian in Doubting Castle; while conversely at the entrance to Dante's Hell were the words, "Lay down all hope, you that go in by me".

=== Hinduism ===
In historic literature of Hinduism, hope is referred to with Pratidhi (Sanskrit: प्रतिधी), or Apêksh (Sanskrit: अपेक्ष). It is discussed with the concepts of desire and wish. In Vedic philosophy, karma was linked to ritual sacrifices (yajna), hope and success linked to correct performance of these rituals. In Vishnu Smriti, the image of hope, morals and work is represented as the virtuous man who rides in a chariot directed by his hopeful mind to his desired wishes, drawn by his five senses, who keeps the chariot on the path of the virtuous, and thus is not distracted by the wrongs such as wrath, greed, and other vices.

In the centuries that followed, the concept of karma changed from sacramental rituals to actual human action that builds and serves society and human existence–a philosophy epitomized in the Bhagavad Gita. Hope, in the structure of beliefs and motivations, is a long-term karmic concept. In Hindu belief, actions have consequences, and while one's effort and work may or may not bear near term fruits, it will serve the good, that the journey of one's diligent efforts (karma) and how one pursues the journey, sooner or later leads to bliss and moksha.

=== Buddhism ===
Buddhism's teachings are centered around the concept of hope. It puts those who are suffering on a path to a more harmonious world and better well-being. Hope acts as a light to those who are lost or suffering. Factors of Saddha (faith), wisdom, and aspiration work together to form practical hope. Practical hope is the foundation of putting those suffering on a path toward inner freedom and holistic well-being. It instills the belief in positive outcomes even in the midst of suffering and adversity.

== See also ==
- Defeatism
- Disappointment
- El Dorado
- Micawberism
- Optimism
- "Self-Reliance"
- The Principle of Hope
- Utopianism
- Spe salvi
