= Culture and positive psychology =

Cultural differences can interact with positive psychology to create great variation, potentially impacting positive psychology interventions. Culture differences have an impact on the interventions of positive psychology. Culture influences how people seek psychological help, their definitions of social structure, and coping strategies. Cross cultural positive psychology is the application of the main themes of positive psychology from cross-cultural or multicultural perspectives.

== Overview ==
Research shows that cultural factors affect notions of perceived happiness. Cultural psychologist Richard Shweder argues that these factors help shape what people deem is good, moral, and virtuous. The current general literature discusses positive psychology in two categories: Western and Eastern. Westerners seek rewards on more of a physical plane, while Easterners seek to transcend the physical plane to a spiritual one. Western literature generally stresses autonomy, individuality, and personal satisfaction, while Eastern work generally focuses on harmony, collective cooperation, and group satisfaction.

Despite cultural differences in many concepts of interest to positive psychology, the overwhelming majority of intervention studies are conducted using samples drawn from Western cultures.

Recent studies show that happiness is a relatively new concept of positive psychology and that the meaning behind positive psychology is more complex than once thought. For the purpose of study, happiness was broken down into two different factors: endogenic and exogenic. Despite the influence of exogenic factors on an individual's happiness, endogenic factors have been proven to form the foundations of happiness. With these new findings, researchers broke down the biological foundations into several categories in order to further understand how endogenic factors play a role in an individual's happiness. The categories researchers selected to examine were genetics, endocrine glands, hormones, physical health, brain and neurotransmitters, typology, and attractiveness. It is also important to note the studies that have been done on twins to help determine what might cause happiness. A study between two twins found that 35–50 percent of happiness can be related to genetic factors. Studying happiness can better help one understand the impact of positive psychology.

== History ==
In the late 1800s and early 1900s, anthropologists and psychologists used race and culture as factors that influence positive, negative behaviors, and attitudes Although it originally included culture, over time there became a perspective that neglected the way that the culture impacts behaviors and attitudes. This was used by some groups to assert dominance over others through eugenics. American psychologists, G. Stanley Hall and Henry H. Goddard, were among some of the notable figures to adopt this view. By the mid 20th century, the dominant view was that culture did not predetermine life outcomes; instead, differences were the consequence of environmental factors. The culturally different perspective holds that unique strengths can be highlighted within every culture.

David Satcher was among the first to emphasize the influences of culture on mental health. Cultural differences occur both between and within nations. Social psychologists have supported the notion that humans are "social animals".

== Major theories ==
Psychologists Charles R. Snyder, Shane J. Lopez, and Jennifer T. Pedrotti identify two major influential western traditions – Athenian and Judeo-Christian – and four major eastern traditions – Confucianism (China), Taoism (China), Buddhism (Japan), and Hinduism (Southeast Asia) – relevant to positive psychology.

=== Western philosophy ===
- The Athenian view (held by Aristotle and Plato) stems from discussion of virtue and human strength. It emphasizes the importance of a political community, or "polis", and states that people with good human virtue arrange themselves into a society and model good behavior.
- The Judeo-Christian approach discusses the importance of the virtues of faith, hope, charity, fortitude, justice, temperance, and wisdom. It states that laws and rituals serve to cultivate strengths within society.

=== Eastern philosophy ===
- Confucianism stresses that leadership and education are central to morality. Emphasis is placed on taking care of others within the group. Virtues are used to achieve enlightenment, or the good life.
- Taoism portrays the concept of "The Way," referring simultaneously to direction, movement, method, and thought. Tao is the energy surrounding and flowing through everyone, and The Way must be achieved through experience, rather than teaching alone.
- Buddhism refers to the teachings of the "Enlightened One," which state that life is full of suffering brought on by human desire and attachment. There is, however, a possible end to the suffering through transcendence and ultimate understanding. Virtues are of utmost importance, and include love, joy, compassion, and composure.
- Hinduism emphasizes the interconnectedness of all things. It advocates for the harmonious union among all individuals, who should strive for ultimate self-improvement and also encouraged to be good to others. Good deeds are motivated by the process of karma.

=== Cultural differences in the concept of well-being ===
Joshanloo (2014) identifies and discusses six broad differences between Western and non-Western conceptions of well-being. His analysis is based on his survey of the accounts of happiness and optimal functioning provided in Western as well as non-Western traditions, including Hinduism, Buddhism, Taoism, Confucianism, and Sufism. These six major domains of difference are as follows:

- Self-Transcendence versus self-enhancement. The way cultures define the self is essential in conceptualizing happiness. Whereas the Western concept of the self is primarily based on the ideals of individualism, eastern traditions tend to regard the self as a small part of the collective and the cosmos. Consistent with the Western understanding of the self, enhancing autonomy, independence, self-esteem, and a strong ego is considered to be a vital ingredient of a good life in these cultures. In contrast, in Asian traditions, the individual self is de-emphasized in one way or another. For example, in Buddhism, the existence of an individual self is considered an illusion.
- Eudaimonism versus hedonism. In contemporary Western psychology, scientific analysis of individuals' mental well-being and quality of life is mainly undertaken in the field of subjective well-being, which has been formulated based on a hedonic understanding of well-being. A hedonistic conceptualization of happiness is in accord with the core values and ethos of modern Western culture, namely liberal modernity, hedonism, and romantic individualism. However, hedonism as a way of pursuing happiness is not equally favored in eastern traditions. In these traditions, positive emotions and pleasures are considered too temporary and marginal to be the criterion against which happiness is measured. Non-Western conceptualizations of happiness are thus more consistent with eudaimonism, which emphasizes virtues in defining happiness.
- Harmony versus mastery. Consistent with the Western dominant way of thinking about humankind and its relationship with the environment, qualities such as environmental mastery and control are highly valued in Western cultures. In contrast, in eastern cultures where interpersonal harmony and adjustment are emphasized, people reach a sense of well-being through promoting mutual sympathy and harmony with others and the whole cosmos. These perspectives value self-transcendence, interdependence, softness, flexibility, and adjustment to the environment rather than autonomy and independence.
- Contentment versus satisfaction. Life satisfaction has been stressed over the past four decades in Western psychological literature on mental health. Life satisfaction is believed in the Western thought to result from need or desire satisfaction. However, contentment, in non-Western cultures, involves satisfaction as well as many other qualities and experiences. It is understood as a delicate balance between joy and sorrow that should be preserved in both happy and sad times. It involves accepting any failure or misery one faces with composure, dignity, and gracefulness. This sense of contentment is believed to result from the realization of the transcendent self. Whereas the contentment is spiritually loaded, life satisfaction is not associated with morality and spirituality.
- Valuing versus avoiding suffering. A potential consequence of a hedonistic conceptualization of happiness that stresses the maximization of subjective well-being (consisting in part of the absence of negative emotions) is that such a conceptualization, which seems to be dominant in the West, makes it difficult to accept hardship, negative affect, and unhappiness as possible integral parts of a good life. Having this in mind, eastern eudaemonistic theories of well-being accept the existence of negative feelings and anhedonia in a truly happy life. From an eastern point of view, one should be able to embrace both positive and negative sides of life.
- Relevance versus relative irrelevance of spirituality and religion. In dominant Western lines of research where materialistic values and moral pluralism are valued, religion and spirituality are studied mainly as predictors of mental well-being, and they are not involved in formulating it. In contrast, in non-Western cultures, spirituality and religion are interwoven in individuals' understanding and experiencing of life in general and happiness in particular. Happiness for many non-Westerners is formulated based on religious and metaphysical worldviews. Transcendence, spirituality, mystical experience, following religious duties, and practicing religious rituals are essential for these people's sense of happiness.

=== Viewpoints within positive psychology ===
There are different approaches within the field of positive psychology. With the support of numerous sources, Bacon presents the idea that there are two "cultures" in positive psychology, or two different ways to view the positive psychology construct of personal strengths: focus culture and balance culture. In focus culture, individuals are focused on developing and expressing their personal strengths. Balance culture is instead oriented towards balancing and bringing harmony within oneself and among others. Bacon argues that individuals ascribing to the focus culture will differ in their life experience and life path than those who believe in the balance culture. Bacon believes that the strengths can be categorized into these two cultures and goes into depth, explaining why creativity is the prototypical strength in the focus culture and why wisdom represents an ideal strength in the balance culture. Rather than tying culture to a certain ethnic or cultural group, Bacon and others argue that there are two different cultures, or schools of thought, within positive psychology. These two cultures reflect a new way to categorize strengths (Bacon, 2005).

== Approaches ==
There are two main approaches to cross-cultural positive psychology. One perspective, termed 'culturally-free' believes that there are numerous human strengths that are valued universally, and that the pursuit of happiness is common across cultures. This approach posits that the science of positive psychology is similar to the science of biology or chemistry in that it is not associated with any one culture or school of thought, but can be applied anywhere at anytime. Proponents of this side view their approach as descriptive, and objective, claiming its results "transcend particular cultures and politics and approach universality". The other approach, dubbed cultural determinism or cultural relativism, views values as culturally embedded, meaning that cultural values of the researchers influence their work. The Diagnostic and Statistical Manual 5 (DSM-V) takes this view and includes information throughout the manual to increase cultural sensitivity and further the awareness of a multicultural perspective in clinical practice. Some of the additional information includes insight into cultural differences in key symptoms of disorders as well as suggestions on how to take cultural context into account during treatment.

Also, Western traditions fostered more individualistic societies while eastern traditions fostered more collectivistic societies. Individualistic cultures value the self above the group. Collectivistic cultures value the group above the individual.

Key western values (Individualism)

- Autonomy/personal freedom
- Competition
- Personal achievement
- Self-oriented
- Future-oriented
- Hope
- Uniqueness (seen through commodities, names, attitudes, performances, attributes, etc.)

Key eastern values (Collectivism and individualism)

- Seeks to cultivate interdependence
- Sharing/cooperation
- Conformity/desire to fit in (fosters duty to group and dependence)
- Promote harmony/avoiding conflict
- Going with the flow
- Loyalty to family and friends
- Past-oriented
- Group-oriented
- Compassion

The different thought processes between Western and Eastern cultures impacts the positive psychology that they seek in their own lives. For example, in seeking happiness, Westerners give priority to "life, liberty, and the pursuit of happiness" as well as goal-directed thinking. Easterners, on the other hand, may be more accepting in their situation, and put more weight on inner life balance. The virtue of harmony appears to be a pillar of Eastern culture.

Edward C. Chang did a series of quantitative studies in order to showcase the importance of understanding the equivalence of traits and constructs across cultural groups. For example, Asian Americans were more pessimistic than Caucasians, but the two groups were not all that different on their levels of optimism.

Joseph G. Ponterotto et al. have suggested that the ability to navigate and adapt to the increasingly diverse context of the world, is an important strength. People high on this are said to have "multicultural personalities". It adjusts for differences between cultures. Kristoffer G. van der Zee and Jan P. van Oudenhoven created the Multicultural Personality Questionnaire (MPQ), and identified five factors that describe personality style: cultural empathy, open-mindedness, emotional stability, initiative, and flexibility. This may correlate with enhanced well-being.

Psychology researcher Daphna Oyserman and her colleagues advocate for a less static view of separate cultures (East vs. West), and suggest exploring more dynamic ways explaining the ways in which these cultures operate. Different cultures can operate together, rather than being seen as conflicting (it is not "me vs. we").

An article tracing the genealogy of modern concepts of well-being reveals that contemporary Western models are predominantly based on authentic self-fulfillment—an integrative paradigm that encompasses self-determination, self-creation, and self-expression. In contrast, many indigenous, collectivist, and traditional perspectives prioritize orderly social dynamics and cosmic balance. In most traditional perspectives, the pursuit of personal happiness and self-expression is often secondary to the fulfillment of social and cultural responsibilities, as the well-being of the individual is inextricably linked to the well-being of the community as a whole.

== Major empirical findings ==
There has been a recent effort by researchers to explore how concepts of Positive Psychology differ between cultures, as well as how culture influences how individuals view the good life.

For example, Snyder's chapter (2009) explores the way in which culture affects positive psychology. More specifically, Snyder acknowledges the fact that culture impacts an individual's understanding of strengths and weaknesses. Snyder claims that it is important to understand the cross-section of positive psychology and culture because it allows one to not only understand people within a culture, but it also enables one to appreciate people from different cultures. Snyder outlines two schools of thought in the positive psychology field that pertain to how we should view strengths within a cultural context: culture-free and culturally embedded perspective. Those ascribing to the culture-free perspective believe that strengths are not affected by culture and that there are universal strengths. The culturally embedded perspective argues that one must take into account culture when one is considering strengths because they believe strengths manifest themselves differently in different cultures (Snyder, 2009).

Dahlsgaard, Peterson, and Seligman's (2005) meta-analysis present historical and psychological evidence supporting the contention that there are universal virtues that exist across cultures. They are courage, justice, humanity, temperance, wisdom, and transcendence. These authors note that these virtues have been represented in ancient texts within Confucianism, Taoism, Buddhism, Hinduism, Christianity, Islam, Judaism, and from Athenian scholars. Each of these core virtues was represented in these schools of thought and became entrenched in the societies and cultures that ascribe to these religions and belief systems. Thus, these core virtues of courage, justice, humanity, temperance, wisdom, and transcendence are valued equally across these different cultures (Dahlsgaard et al., 2005).

Another virtue put forth by Seligman in attaining the good life is forgiveness. Previous researchers have not looked extensively at how forgiveness occurs in non-Western cultures, yet virtue is a very culturally embedded value. The research that has explored the virtue of forgiveness in non-Western cultures has found that there are no significant differences in overall levels of forgiveness, yet the reasons behind forgiving and the meaning of forgiveness varies between collectivist and individualistic cultures. For example, forgiveness in individualistic cultures is focused on a particular individual, while Eastern cultures see forgiveness in a broader, community context. Since forgiveness is a key virtue in positive psychology and a relevant topic in counseling, it is important to research forgiveness more thoroughly in a variety of cultures in order to better understand how different cultures view forgiveness.

In studies that highlight differences between Western and Eastern cultures, discrepancies in values and emotions have been found when comparing the United States and China. Some might conclude that people in Eastern cultures are less happy than those in Western cultures, but research indicates that there is more value placed on suffering and transcendence in Eastern cultures than in the United States. It is also commonly believed that there is less happiness experienced by people in Eastern cultures because there is less individuality, but Eastern cultures are socialized in a much more collectivist mindset and develop into adults that are more concerned with finding a place in one's community rather than standing out, as Americans are. These differences in particular indicate that there should be further research into cultural differences to avoid mistakes in classifying behavior and psychological functioning.

Kubokawa and Ottaway's literature review examines how emotions vary across cultures, suggesting that applications of positive psychology need to adapt to different cultural contexts. The authors use self-criticism as an example: self-criticism is considered detrimental to one's well-being in Western cultures, whereas collectivistic cultures value self-criticism as an important tool for personal growth and consider it useful in aligning with societal norms (Heine et al., 2001). The authors also discuss a study conducted in Asian Americans and Caucasians that examined optimism and pessimism. The study found that while Asian Americans rated higher in pessimism than Caucasians, they did not differ in levels of depressive symptoms, indicating that the association between pessimism and depression might not apply in Asian cultures the way it does in Western cultures. In general, many negative emotions in Western cultures do not hold the same connotations in East Asian cultures, leading the authors to suggest that classification of certain emotions as positive and negative is not universal, and that research in positive psychology should cater to these cultural aspects.

Kubokawa and Ottaway also present research that discredits the cultural relevance of the Values in Action Classification of Strengths (VIA) created by Peterson and Seligman. Peterson and Seligman (2004) identified six universal characters strengths and virtues that are valued by all cultures: courage, justice, humanity, temperance, wisdom, and transcendence. These virtues in turn led them to create a subset of 24 strengths common to all cultures. However, Christopher and Hickinbottom (2008) argue that the VIA Classification of Strengths is an oversimplification of cultures. While the values might be similar across cultures, the meaning that Peterson and Seligman ascribed to them are Western-orientated and might not translate well into more collectivist cultures.

=== Cultural differences and the good life ===
Previous research has demonstrated that the good life, as defined by subjective well-being, is rooted in predominantly Western ways of thinking. But, throughout history, subjective well-being has often become less vital in comparison to the needs to the larger community. This change results in individuals feeling subjective well-being in response to the success of their community rather than from their individual experiences. For example, the people of Bali see life as having two realms, everyday life and the spiritual world. Due to this dichotomy, it is difficult to examine subjective well-being without considering both realms, which occurs when positive psychology uses Western ways of thinking about the world.

Another cultural difference in how one conceptualizes the good life can be seen in the beliefs of the Apsáalooke tribe, a Native American tribe in the US. Research has shown that for members of the Apsáalooke tribe, life satisfaction is deeply rooted in the belief that one's life is intertwined with others in their tribe. Due to this feeling of collectivity, satisfaction is taken from helping others. This example is just one of many in which other cultures differ in the concept of satisfaction from the concept of satisfaction in an individualistic culture.

In addition, a difference between collectivist and individualist cultures is the conceptualization of positive and negative emotions, including happiness. For example, research indicates that individualism moderates the relationship between hedonism and happiness, such that hedonism is more strongly related to happiness in more individualistic (vs collectivistic) cultures. In individualist cultures, individuals attempt to avoid negative emotions, but in Eastern communities, some negative emotions are viewed as a virtue. One example of this is that collectivist cultures value shame because they view it as an opportunity to better themselves. So, when Western conceptualizations are applied to Eastern cultures, researchers run the risk of psychological imperialism.

How does the culture of consumerism relate to positive psychology? Past research has shown that consumer culture and the pursuit of extrinsic goals lead to diminished well-being, in comparison to pursuing intrinsic goals that lead to an increase in well-being. These findings not only occur in America, but the same results occurred in samples across a variety of countries, including Romania, Germany, Russia, Singapore, and South Korea. These countries represent both individualistic and collectivist cultures, which demonstrates that one possible universal in positive psychology across cultures is the importance of the pursuit of intrinsic goals.

=== Cultural differences in well-being, meaning, and hope ===
Maygar-Moe, Owens, and Conoley identified specific cultural considerations that affect how practitioners should engage with concepts and theories in positive psychology within counseling settings. The literature review specifically addresses well-being, meaning, and hope.

Well-being

Wealthy, individualistic cultures experience higher levels of social well-being than underprivileged, collectivistic cultures (Diener, Diener, & Diener, 1995). Self-esteem was also more predictive of life satisfaction in individualistic cultures than in collectivistic cultures (Suh, Diner, Oishi, & Triadis, 1998).

==== Meaning ====
Research suggest that searching for meaning is viewed more positively in interdependent culture: Steger, Kawabata, Shimai, and Otake (2008) found that when comparing Japan (example of interdependent culture) and the U.S. (example of independent culture), the Japanese sample was high in searching for meaning while the U.S. sample was higher in experiencing meaning. Additionally, the search for meaning in the Japanese sample was positively related to presence of meaning, unlike in the U.S. sample. Research also indicates that national levels of globalization can moderate the relationship between "thinking about the meaning of life" and life satisfaction. That is, in more globalized cultures, this relationship is negative, whereas in less globalized cultures, this correlation is positive.

==== Hope ====
Maygar-Moe, Owens, and Conoley argue that while previous research supports the idea that is hope is universally a positive expectancy variably, the cultivation of hope varies based on cultural makeup.

European Americans – life satisfaction serves as a source of agentic hope and positive affect was found to be predictive of pathways of hope. Therefore, European Americans would benefit most from interventions that improve life satisfaction and positive affect (Chang & Banks, 2007).

African Americans – lack of negative problem orientation was the strongest predictor for agentic, and positive problem orientation was the best predictor of pathways thinking. Therefore, African Americans would benefit best from interventions that simultaneously reduce a negative problem orientation and increase a positive problem orientation (Chang & Banks, 2007).

Latinos – life satisfaction was the only predictor of pathways thinking, and rational problem solving was the best predictor of agentic thinking, therefore, Latinos would benefit most from interventions aiming to increasing rational problem solving and that would lead to higher life satisfaction (Chang & Banks, 2007).

Asian Americans – positive problem orientation was the strongest predictor of pathways thinking, while positive affect was the strongest predictor of agentic thinking. Therefore, Asian Americans would benefit best from interventions that promote positive affect and a positive problem orientation (Chang & Banks, 2007).

== Applications ==
Culturally appropriate psychoeducational and counseling interventions would benefit from more empirical research on culturally embedded positive psychology. Cross-cultural studies would help with the application of psychological treatment and recovery, along with improving the general understanding of the psyche of diverse populations of people. This is not only important for the differences between Western and Eastern civilizations, but has implications for the various cultural and ethnic groups within the United States of America, a society that has been considered a "melting pot" and has grappled with these issues throughout history. One important aspect of American culture that should be addressed is that of consumerism. Since the negative effects of the culture of consumption transcends specific cultures, it can become a common theme across counseling practices of positive psychology to encourage pursuing intrinsic values and the good life, and avoid pursuing extrinsic goals and the "goods" life.

In addition, a culturally embedded approach would allow professionals outside the mental health field to utilize methodology and concepts from psychology to motivate and help people. Specifically, employers in any field of business would be able to find techniques that are culturally appropriate for encouraging employees to be better engaged in their careers and to find meaning in their work. This can effectively be applied to the cultural network groups that many companies organize for employees, such as women's and African-Americans' networks, that allow for employees and employers to increase the understanding of perspectives and cultural sensitivity in the workplace.

Furthermore, teachers and administrators would be better equipped to address issues in educational achievement and behavioral development amongst diverse groups of students. Since there is currently strong criticism of the public education system for the achievement gap amongst students based on race and socioeconomic status, it would be especially helpful for educational authorities to understand the disparities that students may face due to aspects of their background. Teachers would benefit from knowing how to better foster a love of learning, creativity, optimism, resilience, leadership, and teamwork in diverse groups of students in order to prepare students for achievement in the future. The concept of achievement is tied to the aforementioned topics for many children. When achievement seems possible for all students, regardless of their cultural backgrounds, they may be more likely to persistently pursue attaining it.

=== Applications of strengths theory across cultures ===
Virtues and strengths are valued differently across cultures, which in turn means that attempts to build strengths using positive psychology within counseling settings can only be successful if they include important cultural considerations. For example, Chang (1996) found that Asian Americans reported higher levels of pessimism than Caucasians, however within that population pessimism was not found to contribute to depression and was associated with positive problem-solving strategies. This suggests that while pessimism is considered a weakness in some cultures, it might actually serve as a strength in others: defensive pessimism, for example, leads people to set lower expectations for themselves. This supports the idea that applications of positive psychology to cultivate strengths need to be altered to fit the clients' cultural backgrounds.

== Controversies ==
=== Overstatement of sample and cohort differences: within ideological context ===
Individual differences in the way people experience positive and negative emotions affect study results in a way that makes sample and cohort differences less important than the studies stress. More specifically, the conception of the self is key in positive psychology, and cross cultural differences in the conception of the self-make it difficult to generalize results. What must be made clear in any given research is the necessity to define the camp of ideology from which the research is founded: a culture-free perspective, where the investigators assume that there are principles of positive psychology that transcend cultures and politics and reach universality and focus on the reports of those principles in all cultural studies; or a culturally-embedded perspective, where investigators acknowledge positive psychological principles that are made special due to the cultural context.

=== Non-standardized measurement of emotion ===
The first two problems converge for an even larger issue: the measurement of emotion is far from accurate. However, many studies and researchers use "oversimple checklists and questionnaires without follow-up or exploration of their adequacy." Without in-depth explorations, the possibilities of finding observations about the flow of events in an emotional encounter is minimal. Thus, with very subjective results and the inadequacy to rule out other causal connections, the measurement of positive emotion itself is flawed.

With the cultural aspect of positive psychology, the problems largely consist of the definition of positive emotions and notions of a positive life. Many of the ideals that are associated with a positive psychology are notions that are deeply ingrained within Western cultures and do not necessarily apply to all groups of people. In relation to the previous point about measuring positive emotion, many of the social conditions in emotion measurement are ignored.

"Positive psychology is doomed to being narrow and ethnocentric as long as its researchers remain unaware of the cultural assumptions underlying their work." A large part of the literature debates whether positive psychology is innately culture-free or culture-embedded. Those who advocate culture-free positive psychology state that happiness is a universal trait, whereas advocates of culture-embedded positive psychology believe that people reach happiness differently, depending on their culture.

Non-standardized measurements of emotion are also due to the fact that pleasant hedonic experiences are expressed in very different ways across cultural groups, hindering researchers' ability to choose universal terms that will accurately describe these experiences without completely disregarding their cultural context. For example, Mesquita and Frijda (1992) argue that the word for "happiness" not only changes across languages, but it also describes a different emotional experience. In English, happiness refers to a "high arousal, exuberant experience," while its equivalent in Hindi, sukhi, refers to a low-arousal experience of peace and happiness, and in Kenya, for the Kipsigis, "happiness" is a lack of negative experiences, indicating a quiet and calm state. This makes it challenging for researchers to study positive psychology across cultures, as different interpretations of these terms could lead to invalid assumptions about specific emotions.

== See also ==
- Cross-cultural psychology
- Positive psychology
