= Lumen fidei =

2013 encyclical of Pope Francis

Lumen fidei Latin for 'The Light of Faith' Encyclical of Pope Francis
- Signature date: 29 June 2013
- Subject: On faith
- Pages: 88
- Number: 1 of 4 of the pontificate
- Text: In Latin; In English

Lumen fidei (The Light of Faith) is the first encyclical of Pope Francis, issued on 29 June 2013, the Solemnity of Saints Peter and Paul, and published on 5 July 2013, less than four months after his election to the papacy. It was issued in conjunction with the Year of Faith proclaimed by his predecessor Pope Benedict XVI to be observed from October 2012 to November 2013. It is the first encyclical in the history of the Catholic Church written by two popes, being begun by Pope Benedict XVI and finished by Pope Francis.

== Subject ==
According to Francis X. Rocca, the encyclical is a celebration of Christian faith as the guiding light of a 'successful and fruitful life', inspiring social action as well as devotion to God, and illuminating 'every aspect of human existence', including philosophy and the natural sciences."

The encyclical focuses on faith and completes what his predecessor Pope Benedict XVI had previously written about charity and hope, the other two theological virtues, in his encyclicals Deus caritas est and Spe Salvi. Francis worked from a first draft completed by Benedict before his resignation and makes the authorship clear: "These considerations on faith – in continuity with all that the Church's magisterium has pronounced on this theological virtue – are meant to supplement what Benedict XVI had written in his encyclical letters on charity and hope. He himself had almost completed a first draft of an encyclical on faith. For this I am deeply grateful to him, and as his brother in Christ I have taken up his fine work and added a few contributions of my own."

It is divided into four chapters, with an introduction and a conclusion. The encyclical traces the history of the faith of the Church (from the call of God to Abraham and the people of Israel, to the resurrection of Jesus), discusses the relationship between reason and faith, the Church's role in the transmission of the faith, and the role faith plays in the building of societies in search of the common good. The text concludes with a prayer to the Virgin Mary, who is presented as a model of faith.

== Content ==
The metaphor of life as a journey has been used by Pope Francis before, notably in his address to the bishops of Brazil in July 2013. In Lumen fidei, he observes that faith was formerly viewed as a light that dispels the darkness and illuminates the way, but later came to be "understood either as a leap in the dark, to be taken in the absence of light, driven by blind emotion, or as a subjective light, capable perhaps of warming the heart and bringing personal consolation, but not something which could be proposed to others as an objective and shared light which points the way." Part of the purpose of the encyclical is to restore the light of faith to an understanding of its place in the common journey of mankind.
