= IBM (disambiguation) =

IBM, or International Business Machines, is an American multinational technology and consulting corporation headquartered in Armonk, New York.

IBM may also refer to:

- IBM (atoms), a demonstration of the creation of the initials "IBM" using individual atoms in 1990
- Identity based motivation, a social psychological theory of human motivation and goal pursuit
- Inclusion body myositis, an inflammatory muscle disease
- Injection blow molding, blow molding manufacturing process
- Interacting boson model, in nuclear physics
- International Brotherhood of Magicians
- itty bitty machine company, or "ibm", a small computer retail store in Evanston, Illinois, United States
- Izu–Bonin–Mariana Arc system, a plate tectonic convergent boundary in the Pacific Ocean
- Invisible Black Matter, a fictional substance in Ajin: Demi-Human

== See also ==
- IBM railway station, near Greenock, Scotland, United Kingdom
- Interactive Broadcast Media (IBMI), a Philippine radio network
- Intercontinental ballistic missile (ICBM)
