= Deus caritas est =

2005 papal encyclical by Pope Benedict XVI

Deus caritas est Latin for 'God is Love' Encyclical of Pope Benedict XVI
- Signature date: 25 December 2005
- Subject: Christian love
- Pages: 95
- Number: 1 of 3 of the pontificate
- Text: In Latin; In English

Deus caritas est (English: "God is Love"), subtitled De Christiano Amore (Of Christian Love), is a 2005 encyclical, the first written by Pope Benedict XVI, in large part derived from writings by his late predecessor, Pope John Paul II. Its subject is love, as seen from a Christian perspective, and God's place within all love. Charity is one of the three theological virtues; and the other two (hope and faith) were treated in two successive encyclicals, one signed by Benedict (Spe Salvi) and one written substantially by him but signed by his successor Pope Francis (Lumen fidei). This text begins with a reflection on the forms of love known in Greek philosophy—eros (possessive, often sexual, love), agape (unconditional, self-sacrificing love), philia (friendship)—and their relationship with the teachings of Jesus.

The encyclical contains almost 16,000 words in 42 paragraphs. The first half is said to have been written by Benedict in German, his mother tongue, in the summer of 2005; the second half is derived from uncompleted writings left by John Paul II. The document was signed by Pope Benedict on Christmas Day, 25 December 2005. Some reports attribute the delay to problems in translating the original German text into Latin, others to disputes within the Vatican over the precise wording of the document.

The encyclical was promulgated on 25 January 2006, in Latin and officially translated into seven other languages (English, French, German, Italian, Polish, Portuguese, and Spanish). It is the first encyclical to be published since the Vatican decided to assert copyright in the official writings of the Pope.

== Title ==
The Latin title of an encyclical is taken from its first few words. This encyclical begins with a quotation from the Vulgate, First Epistle of John, chapter 4, verse 16 translated from the original Greek, Ὁ Θεὸς ἀγάπη ἐστίν (Ho Theos agape estin). The Douai Bible translates this into English as "God is charity", while in most contemporary English translations it reads "God is love" (even if "charity" is the most accurate translation of "caritas"). The Latin version of the First Epistle of John uses the same formulation, Deus caritas est, at the end of chapter 4, verse 8 translating the same phrase in Greek. This second biblical reference is not mentioned in the encyclical.

== Summary ==
In this encyclical, Benedict reflects on the concepts of eros, agape, and philia, and their relationship with the teachings of Jesus. Eros and agape are two of the various Greek words for love, each of which has a slightly different shade of meaning: agape is descending, oblative love in which one gives of oneself to another; eros is ascending, possessive love which seeks to receive from another; philia is the mutual love between friends.

The first half of the encyclical is more philosophical, tracing the meaning of the Greek words for "love". In considering eros, Benedict refers to a line from Virgil's Eclogues, Book X, line 69, "Omnia vincit amor, et nos cedamus amori" ("Love conquers all, let us also yield to love"), and the opinion of Friedrich Nietzsche that Christianity has poisoned eros, turning it into a vice. He refers to the conjugal love exhibited in the Song of Songs, and analyzes passages from the First Letter of St. John which inspired the title. The encyclical argues that eros and agape are not distinct kinds of love, but are separate halves of complete love, unified as both a giving and receiving.

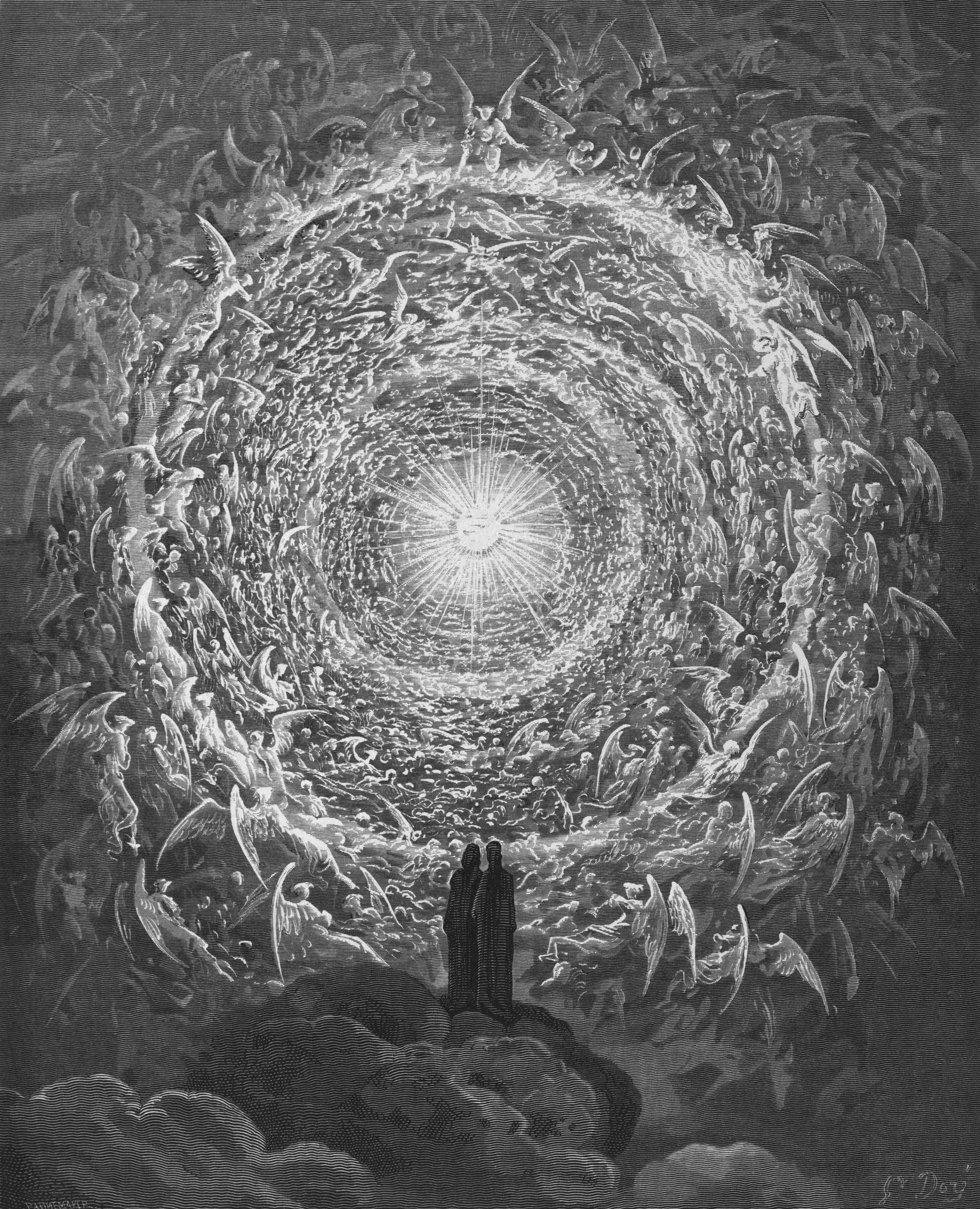
Dante and Beatrice gaze upon the highest Heaven; from Gustave Doré's illustrations to the Divine Comedy, Paradiso, Canto XXXI.

The second half, based on a report prepared by the Pontifical Council Cor Unum, is less abstract, considering the charitable activities of the Church as an expression of love which draws its power from contemplative union with God. The second half also refers to the Church's threefold responsibility: proclaiming the word of God (kerygma-martyria), celebrating the sacraments (leitourgia), and exercising the ministry of charity (diakonia).

The encyclical says that social justice is the primary responsibility of politics and the laity; the church itself should inform the debate on social justice with reason guided by faith, but its main social activity should be directed towards charity. Charity workers should have a deep prayer life, and be uninfluenced by party and ideology. Benedict rejects both "particular insistence by Marxism" that "the poor... do not need charity but justice", and the merger of church and state functions (theocracy); rather, he encourages cooperation between the church, the state, and other Christian charitable organizations.

Paragraph 39 appears to be inspired by Dante Alighieri's Divine Comedy, reflecting in particular the last canto of "Paradise", which ends before "the everlasting Light that is God himself, before that Light which at the same time is the love which moves the sun and the other stars". The three concluding paragraphs consider the example of the saints, ending with a prayer to the Virgin Mary. The text mentions the name of Mother Teresa four times, the last as a "saint" (despite the fact that she was not yet canonised) in such company as Francis of Assisi, Ignatius of Loyola, John of God, Camillus of Lellis, Vincent de Paul, Louise de Marillac, Giuseppe B. Cottolengo, John Bosco, and Luigi Orione.

Deus caritas est, like the encyclicals of many previous popes, including Pope John Paul II, uses the Royal we in the official Latin text ("cupimus loqui de amore"). This is the text that appears promulgated in the Vatican's official gazette of record, "Acta Apostolicae Sedis". However, in accordance with a practice initiated in the pontificate of John Paul II, the unofficial versions prepared by the Vatican in 7 other languages use the singular ("I wish to speak of love").

== Analysis ==
Writers in The Oxford Handbook of Catholic Theology state that for Benedict, agape purifies eros. Cathleen Falsani, writing for the Chicago Sun-Times, states that the document explains that eros and agape are both inherently good, but that eros risks being downgraded to mere sex if it is not balanced by an element of spiritual Christianity. Falsani states that the opinion that eros is inherently good follows a school of thought in the Catholic Church known as the "Caritas tradition", and contrasts with the view expressed, for example, by Anders Nygren, a Lutheran bishop, in his mid-20th century book Eros and Agape, that agape is the only truly Christian kind of love, and that eros is an expression of the individual's desires and turns us away from God. These two positions have been an ongoing cause for debate in both Catholic and Protestant theology. The continuity of these two forms of love follows the traditional Catholic understanding, which is influenced by the philosophy of Plato, Augustine, Bonaventure and ancient Jewish tradition. The Nygren position was favoured by the Reformed theologian Karl Barth while the Caritas position was supported by the liberal Protestant theologian Paul Tillich.

== Other events ==
On 25 December 2005, on the occasion of the first Christmas Urbi et Orbi Message of his Pontificate and of the encyclical's signature, Pope Benedict XIV talked about the New World Order, pandemy, and green conversion.

At an audience on 18 January 2006, Pope Benedict said that Deus caritas est would discuss the concept of love "in its various dimensions, from the love between man and woman to the love that the Catholic Church has for others in its expression of charity". The Vatican, through the Pontifical Council Cor Unum, sponsored a conference in Rome to discuss the themes of the encyclical on 23 January and 24 January 2006.

The encyclical was published on the feast of the Conversion of Saint Paul and on the last day of the Week of Prayer for Christian Unity. Pope Benedict led an ecumenical prayer service at the Basilica of Saint Paul Outside the Walls, a traditional site for such celebrations, on the evening after the encyclical was published. Presiding at vespers, he said in his homily: "God is love. On this solid rock the entire faith of the church is based."

== See also ==
- Caritas Internationalis
- Trinity § Love
