= Shane J. Lopez =

American psychologist

Shane J. Lopez (4 April 1970 – 23 July 2016) was an American psychologist who worked as a senior scientist for Gallup and as research director of The Don Clifton Strengths Institute. He was also a fellow of the American Psychological Association.

His research focused on hope which aims to show that investing in one's future reaps immediate rewards. Lopez was also a vocal advocate for a psychological reform of America's education system with the goal of aiding schools to operate in a manner that encourages dynamic development and enables students to achieve meaningful futures that they desire. His research studies the relationship between hope, strengths development, academic success and general well-being. A great deal of his research specializes in hope and strengths enhancement for students from preschool through college graduation.

== Research ==
Lopez's research suggests that hopeful students see the future as better than the present and believe they have the power to create an improved future. Lopez defines hope as the ideas and energy one has for the future; one of the most important predictors of success for youth.

Lopez's survey of research on hope has indicated that hope is not significantly related to native intelligence nor income. However it is consistently linked to school attendance, credits earned, and academic achievement. Hopeful students are more successful because they are able to develop the strategies to reach goals and have the energy to plan alternate means in the event of possible deterrents. These obstacles are viewed as challenges to be overcome and can be bypassed with alternative pathways. Hopeful students expect good outcomes and focus on success and therefore experience greater positive affect and less distress. Additionally people who have more hope tend to experience less anxiety and less stress, specifically in test-taking situations.

Conversely, students who lack sufficient hope, are stuck, or discouraged, may lack the energy to get things accomplished. These students are more likely to give up when encountering obstacles to goals because they are unable to think of alternative pathways or unable to get the support they need. This is likely to result in frustration as well as reduced confidence and self-esteem. Hence these students experience high anxiety, especially in test-taking situations. Additionally, less hopeful students don't use feedback from failures to make changes in the future.
