= Spe salvi =

2007 Papal encyclical by Pope Benedict XVI

Spe salvi Latin for 'Saved in Hope' Encyclical of Pope Benedict XVI
- Signature date: 30 November 2007
- Subject: Hope and Salvation
- Pages: 77
- Number: 2 of 3 of the pontificate
- Text: In Latin; In English
- AAS: 99 (12): 985-1027

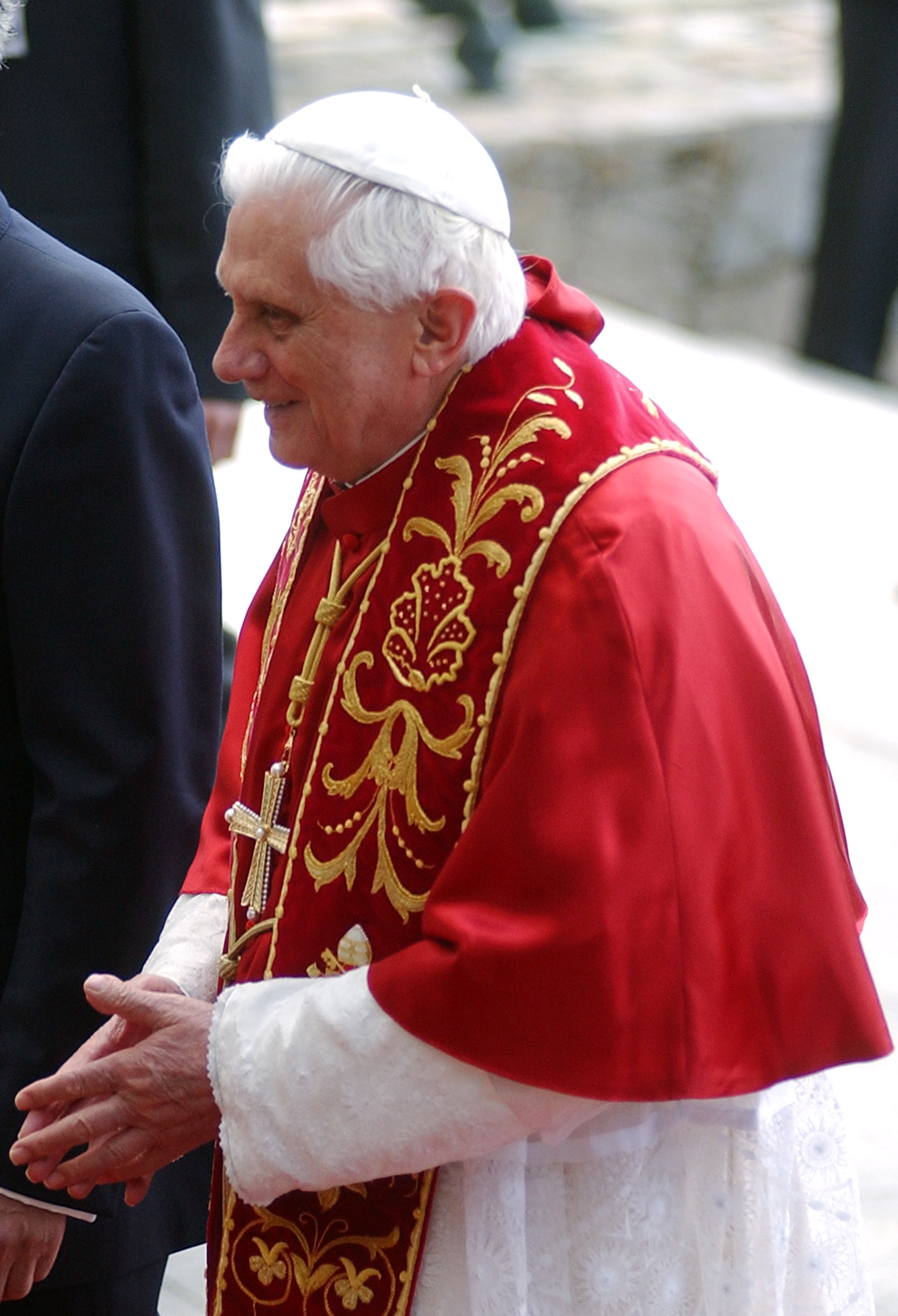
Benedict XVI: "The one who has hope lives differently; the one who hopes has been granted the gift of a new life."

Spe salvi (English: "Saved in Hope"), referencing the Latin phrase from Romans 8:24, Spe salvi facti sumus ("in hope we were saved"), is the second encyclical letter by Pope Benedict XVI promulgated on November 30, 2007, and is about the theological virtue of hope. Benedict has systematically touched upon the three theological virtues: love in 2005 Deus caritas est ("God is Love"), hope in this encyclical, and faith in 2013 Lumen fidei ("The Light of Faith"), written with Pope Francis. In this letter, he sees as "a distinguishing mark of Christians the fact that they have a future: it is not that they know the details of what awaits them, but they know in general terms that their life will not end in emptiness".

== Title ==
As is customary for papal encyclicals, the Latin title of Spe salvi comes from its incipit, which quotes St. Paul's Epistle to the Romans: "For we are saved by hope. But hope that is seen is not hope. For what a man seeth, why doth he hope for?" In his introduction to the encyclical, Benedict sets the tone of his text by asking about the relationship between hope and redemption.

== Contents ==
The encyclical contains over 18,900 words, divided into fifty paragraphs, and organized into an introduction and eight chapters.

According to Richard Neuhaus, Benedict argues that "...hope is faith disposed toward the future, and making all the difference in the present".

Benedict traces the relationship between the Christian concept of hope and redemption. The first six chapters are theological in nature, but often use historical examples to highlight applications to daily life. Benedict starts by quoting St. Paul's reminder to the early Church community that before converting to Christianity, they were "without hope and without God in the world" (Epistle to the Ephesians 2:12). Benedict relates the story of Josephine Bakhita as an example of the contrast between a prior, pagan way of life and the new "hopeful" Christian life. Josephine, an African saint who lived her early life as a slave, converted to Catholicism after finding "the great hope" which had "redeemed" her. She spent the rest of her life as a nun, preaching throughout Italy and was canonized in 2000.

Paragraphs four, five, and six describe a series of contrasts that serve to clearly define Christ's role as revolutionary in the Roman empire and its implications for Christians. Benedict draws clear distinction between the failed socio-political revolutions or liberations of Spartacus, Barabbas, and Bar-Kochba with "the new (non-political) hope" of Jesus. He concludes that Jesus brought "an encounter with the Lord of all lords, an encounter with the living God and thus an encounter with a hope stronger than the sufferings of slavery, a hope which transformed life and the world from within", something that these revolutionaries could not. These paragraphs recall Benedict's persistent rejection of Marxism and Liberation Theology throughout his teachings and specifically in Deus caritas est.

Benedict then draws on early Christian sarcophagi representations of Jesus as philosopher and shepherd to illustrate that Christian hope extends beyond this life on earth. The Good Shepherd, who has himself passed through death, guides his followers beyond it, so that death itself is not something to be feared.

In paragraph seven, he proceeds to link hope and redemption to the theological virtue of faith by analyzing the Greek and Latin translation of: Est autem fides sperandarum substantia rerum, argumentum non apparentium. ("[F]aith is the “substance” of things hoped for; the proof of things not seen.")

=== "Eternal life – what is it?" ===
Benedict deals with the topic of eternal life, explaining that it is not a mere prolongation of existence but the blissful completion of life. He points out that in the baptismal rite the parents presenting the child ask for faith because faith brings eternal life.

Perhaps many people reject the faith today simply because they do not find the prospect of eternal life attractive. What they desire is not eternal life at all, but this present life, for which faith in eternal life seems something of an impediment. To continue living for ever —endlessly—appears more like a curse than a gift. Death, admittedly, one would wish to postpone for as long as possible. But to live always, without end—this, all things considered, can only be monotonous and ultimately unbearable.

He then references St. Ambrose's funeral oration for his brother Satyrus: “Death was not part of nature; it became part of nature. God did not decree death from the beginning; he prescribed it as a remedy. Human life, because of sin ... began to experience the burden of wretchedness in unremitting labour and unbearable sorrow. There had to be a limit to its evils; ...Without the assistance of grace, immortality is more of a burden than a blessing”.

=== Final chapters ===
In the next chapter, "Is Christian hope individualistic?", he mentions theologians like Henri de Lubac and such mystics as Augustine of Hippo, Bernard of Clairvaux, and Benedict of Nursia. Then, in the chapter "The transformation of Christian faith-hope in the modern age", Francis Bacon, Immanuel Kant, Friedrich Engels and Karl Marx appear with respect to the relationship between faith and reason.

In the chapter "The true shape of Christian hope" Benedict cites Vladimir Lenin, Karl Marx and Theodor W. Adorno, while in "Settings for learning and practising hope" he mentions with reference to, among others, Cardinal Nguyen Van Thuan, the philosopher Max Horkheimer, Fyodor Dostoyevsky and Plato. The encyclical closes with a chapter concerned with "Mary, Star of Hope".
