= Daphna Oyserman =

American psychologist

- Born: United States
- Education: University of Michigan
- Known for: Culture, Identity and Mindsets, Identity Based Motivation
- Awards: Fellow of W. T. Grant Faculty Scholar Award, Humboldt Scientific Contribution Prize of the German Alexander von Humboldt Foundation, Fellow of the American Psychological Association, Association for Psychological Science, Society for Personality and Social Psychology, Society for Experimental Social Psychology
- Scientific career
- Fields: Psychology, Culture, Education
- Workplaces: University of Southern California

Daphna Oyserman is a Dean's Professor in the Department of Psychology and of Education and Communication at the University of Southern California. She is also a co-director of the USC Dornsife Mind and Society Center. Oyserman received a PhD in psychology and social work from the University of Michigan (1987). She was on the faculty of The Hebrew University, Jerusalem before joining the University of Michigan, where she last held appointments as the Edwin J. Thomas Collegiate Professor of Social Work, Professor of Psychology, and research professor in the Institute for Social Research. She has been recognized by several international organizations for her contributions to psychology—she is a Fellow of the Association for Psychological Science, the American Psychological Association, the Society for Experimental Social Psychology, and the Society for Personality and Social Psychology.

Oyserman is interested in cultural differences in affect, behavior, and cognition – how people feel, act, and think about themselves and the world around them. She also examines racial, ethnic and social class gaps in educational achievement and health (also see work relating to gender and self-concept).

Across these domains of research and in different contexts, Oyserman investigates how changes in mindset can shape the perceived meaning of behaviors and situations and how these shifts can have significant effects on health and academic performance. Throughout her work, she examines how apparently “fixed” differences between groups may in fact mask highly malleable situated processes that can be profoundly influenced through small interventions that shift mindset.

Oyserman's research has direct implications for the classroom and goal attainment in other domains. Her work has received significant media attention for its novel theoretical and applied value.

== Culture and mindset ==
In 2002, Oyserman and colleagues conducted a comprehensive meta-analysis to examine cross-country/region differences in cognitive processes. She found that differences in cognition mapped onto regional differences in collectivism and individualism. That paper alone has been cited over 3000 times in just over 10 years. In fact this paper is honored on the ISI Web of Science ("Hot Topic in Psychology/Psychiatric" in July 2002 as the fastest increasing citation impact of that year, and in 2004 "Top 3 Hot Papers Published in the Last Three Years for Psychology/Psychiatry"). A few years later, Oyserman observed that each culture benefits from independence and interdependence and that most people likely have access to both of these—essential—cognitive processes. Indeed, Oyserman found that people did not have to come from a particular culture in order to draw on an individualist or collectivist mindset. Rather, simply priming people to think from an individualist or collectivist perspective can produce effects that look just like cultural differences. For instance, getting people to circle “I” or “Mine” can make “individualist” Americans look just like “collectivist” Chinese or Koreans and vice versa.

Neither mindset is superior—the extent to which they enhance (or impair) performance depends on the task at hand. Once primed, people will draw on a mindset regardless of whether it helps or hurts them to complete an ongoing task. In the context of the SAT, a shift in mindset can alter performance from 10 to 15%.

== Health and achievement ==
Mindsets exist beyond cultural contexts too. Oyserman has investigated how another set of mindsets influence persistent engagement in goals such as health or academic achievement. She started with the observation that there is often a mismatch between children's aspirations and their actual attainment. For instance, children generally have high aspirations for their education, but in reality, their attainment lags behind. Some groups are affected more by this mismatch in aspirations and actual attainment—boys, low income children, African American and Latino children, whose aspirations are similar to those of girls, high income children and children from other racial-ethnic backgrounds but whose attainments are more likely to lag behind. Oyserman found that to take the steps to reach an end goal depend in part of how we overcome challenges.

Relatively rigid societal structures contribute to this mismatch. And although interventions to address these structural issues are intensive (large‐scale, long term and financially demanding) there is growing evidence that they might change children's opportunity structures. One reason they do this is because they influence children's perceptions of what is possible for them, and people like them, in the future. Accordingly, interventions that focus on this macro‐micro interface can help children overcome the constraints imposed by social structural variables.

== Identity-based motivation ==
A core way to intervene with aspiration-achievement gaps in academics is to make school success part of a child's perceived identity. Oyserman's theory of identity‐based motivation (IBM, Oyserman, 2007, 2009) has been used as a foundation for school interventions (and tests of those interventions) in public schools in Detroit, Chicago, and other locations in the U.S. as well as internationally in Singapore and England.

The IBM model assumes that identity is multifaceted and dynamically constructed in context. People interpret situations in ways that are congruent with their currently active identity and prefer identity‐congruent actions over identity‐incongruent ones. One way this plays out is that students are more likely to act on steps toward a future self goal (e.g. college) when their perceived future self feels congruent with their current self-identity. This feeling of congruence can set students on a path towards their future selves, and it can shape how they interpret experienced difficulty along the way. Two interpretations of experienced difficulty are highlighted. The first way to interpret experienced difficulty is that it reflects the importance of a task or of attaining a goal. Experienced difficulty in this case reflects that this is the path—as in the saying “no pain, no gain.” The second way to interpret experienced difficulty is that it reflects the possibility of succeeding in a task or of attaining a goal. Experienced difficulty in this case reflects that this not likely or even impossible. The same experience of difficulty can be interpreted either way depending on the momentary cues and what activated identities seem to mean for engagement.

The elements of IBM were translated into activities for school-based intervention. This identity-goal approach has real world consequences: randomized trials show significant improvement in academic outcomes. The intervention is available for use, and the active ingredients can be used in other platforms (e.g., edugames) or as part of regular instruction techniques for teachers.
