= Identity based motivation =

Social psychological theory of human motivation

Identity-based motivation theory (IBM) is a social psychological theory of human motivation and goal pursuit, which explains when and in which situations people’s identities or self-concepts will motivate and to take action towards their goals.

IBM predicts that the motivational power of our identities depends on which identities come to mind and what they are taken to mean in a given moment (termed “dynamic construction”), whether or not those identities feel like they fit with the current situation (termed “action-readiness”), and how experienced difficulties are interpreted (termed “interpretation of difficulty”).

People interpret situations and experienced difficulties in ways that are consistent with whichever identities are currently on their minds, and prefer to act in ways that are identity-consistent rather than identity-inconsistent. When actions feel identity-consistent, difficulties that come up tend to be interpreted as important, suggesting actions are meaningful. On the other hand, when actions feel identity-inconsistent, the same difficulties suggest the behavior is pointless and “not for people like me.”

The IBM model was developed by University of Southern California Professor Daphna Oyserman, and has been used as a foundation for a variety of aspiration-achievement gap interventions in schools, health, planning, and savings. Identity-based motivation theory is also used in understanding motivations behind giving both gifts and charity, consumer behavior, and the interface between culture and identity.

== Early inspiration for IBM – Devil's Night in Detroit ==
Devil's Night in Detroit, the eve before Halloween when youths traditionally tear up the town, got Oyserman, thinking about the role of identities in how we make decisions.

Oyserman had just arrived in nearby Ann Arbor for her doctoral studies at the University of Michigan. In quainter times, Devil’s Night tricks involved egging windows and toilet-papering trees. But by then – 1983 – pranks had escalated to fire-setting in parts of the city.

“I wondered what the youths who were setting fires were imagining about their futures,” Oyserman wrote in the author’s note of her book Pathways to Success Through Identity-Based Motivation. “Surely they were not thinking something along the lines of ‘I will set a fire and this may ruin my life if I get caught in a felony and am jailed’ or ‘I will set a fire and someone might die in this fire; it will be on my conscience and forever change the person I become.’”

On the other hand, she wondered about the ones who did not partake. “Perhaps they had a particular way of imagining possibilities for their future selves that highlighted the risks of participating in Devil’s Night.”

This experience led Oyserman to pursue decades of research that manifested into the current theory of identity-based motivation.

== Original studies ==
In a first test of the IBM process model, low-income racial-ethnic minority middle school students were randomly assigned to either attend school as usual or to an identity-based motivation intervention in an in-school randomized trial. Intervention students participated in small group activities in which they were asked to think about the type of student they would like to be (“academic possible identities”), think about how who they were was connected to who they wanted to be the next year and when they were adults, and were guided to interpret experienced difficulties in school as signs that school is important. Students in the control group went to school as usual and experienced the usual difficulties with schoolwork without a structured interpretation.

Prior to the intervention, there were no differences between the two groups of students in terms of school grades, attendance, amount of time spent on homework, in-class behavior, or aspirations students had. The intervention involved 12 bi-weekly in-class sessions completed before the end of the first marking period of 8th grade.

Compared to students in the control group, students in the intervention group had improved grades, spent more time on their homework, and had better attendance and standardized test scores.

== Further empirical studies ==
Follow up experiments demonstrated that results generalized to the broader population. Results have been replicated and extended with students ranging from elementary school to universities.

In addition to results in the education domain, IBM has also been shown to improve motivation and goal pursuit outcomes in health – nudging people to engage in healthier behaviors, planning – reducing people’s tendency to procrastinate, and savings – increasing the amount people plan to save for long term goals such as their child’s college education or their retirement

== IBM interventions ==
Identity-based motivation has been used as a foundation for school interventions (and tests of those interventions) in public schools in Detroit, Chicago, and other locations in the U.S. as well as internationally in Singapore and England.

== Mechanisms ==
The IBM model assumes that identity is multifaceted, and which identities come to mind and what they are taken to mean depends on the situation in which one finds themselves (see Figure below from Oyserman, Lewis, Yan, Fisher, O'Donnell, & Horowitz, 2017). People interpret situations in ways that are consistent with whichever identity is currently on their mind, and prefer to act in ways that are identity-consistent .

One way this manifests in the education domain, for example, is that students are more likely to take steps toward a future self goal (e.g. college) when this identity comes to mind and feels connected with their current self. This feeling of connectedness can set students on a path toward their future goals and can shape how they interpret difficulty along the way.

Two interpretations of difficulty are possible. The first way to interpret experienced difficulty is that it reflects the importance of a task or of attaining a goal. Experienced difficulty in this case, suggests that although the path may be difficult, it is worth it, as articulated in the saying “no pain, no gain.” The second way to interpret experienced difficulty is that it reflects the possibility of failing in a task or of attaining a goal. Experienced difficulty in this case, reflects that the goal is unlikely or even impossible. The same objective experience of difficulty can be interpreted either way depending on which cues are available in the particular moment and what the identities currently on one’s mind seem to mean for action.

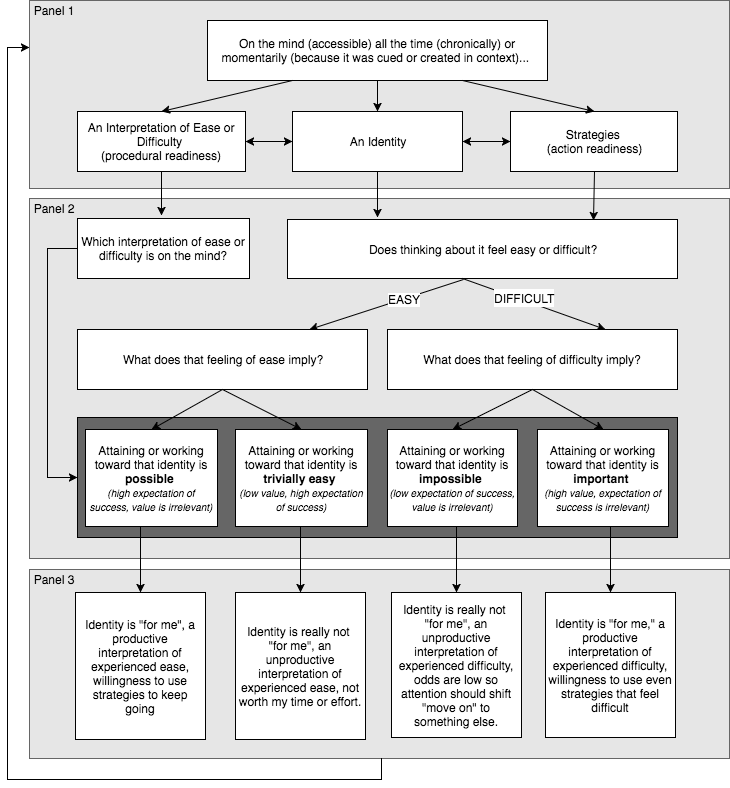
