= Theological virtues =

Christian ethics

Theological virtues are virtues associated in Christian theology and philosophy with salvation resulting from the grace of God. Virtues are traits or qualities which dispose one to conduct oneself in a morally good manner. Traditionally the theological virtues have been named faith, hope, and charity (love). They are coupled with the four natural or cardinal virtues, and opposed to the seven deadly sins.

The medieval Catholic philosopher Thomas Aquinas explained that these virtues are called theological virtues "first, because their object is God, inasmuch as they direct us aright to God: secondly, because they are infused in us by God alone: thirdly, because these virtues are not made known to us, save by Divine revelation, contained in Holy Writ".

== Background ==
=== 1 Corinthians 13 ===
The first mention in Christian literature of the three theological virtues is in St. Paul's first letter to the Thessalonians 1:3, "...calling to mind your work of faith and labor of love and endurance in hope..." In 1 Thessalonians 5:8, he refers to this triad of virtues again, "But since we are of the day, let us be sober, putting on the breastplate of faith and love and the helmet that is hope for salvation."

In 1 Corinthians 13, Paul places the greater emphasis on Charity (Love). "So faith, hope, love remain, these three; but the greatest of these is love." First, because it informs the other two: "It bears all things, believes all things, hopes all things, endures all things." According to Augustine of Hippo, from a temporal perspective, love lasts, while "Hope isn't hope if its object is seen," and faith gives way to possession. This view is shared by Gregory of Nyssa.

=== Aquinas ===
Aquinas found an interconnection of practical wisdom (prudentia) and moral virtue (e.g. courage without prudence risks becoming mere foolhardiness). This is frequently termed "the Unity of the Virtues."

Aquinas stated that theological virtues are so called "because they have God for their object, both in so far as by them we are properly directed to Him, and because they are infused into our souls by God alone, as also, finally, because we come to know of them only by Divine revelation in the Sacred Scriptures".

In his treatment of the virtues, Aquinas viewed the theological virtues as being the product of habitual grace. According to Aquinas, this grace, through the theological virtues, allows humanity to become agents in meritorious action that is beyond their own natural ability. In this way it is supernatural.

Aquinas says "Faith has the character of a virtue, not because of the things it believes, for faith is of things that appear not, but because it adheres to the testimony of one in whom truth is infallibly found".

Aquinas further connected the theological virtues with the cardinal virtues. He views the supernatural inclinations of the theological virtues, caused by habitual grace, to find their fulfillment in being acted upon in the cardinal virtues.

== Teaching by denomination ==
=== Catholic Church ===
The Catechism of the Catholic Church teaches that faith, hope, and love (charity) "dispose Christians to live in a relationship with the Holy Trinity. They have God for their origin, their motive, and their object – God known by faith, hoped in, and loved for His own sake."

=== Moravian Church ===
Among essential beliefs, the Moravian Church teaches that "God creates; God redeems; God blesses. And we respond in faith, in love, and in hope." As such, Moravian Christians teach to judge themselves "by how deep our faith is, how expansive our love is, and how life affirming our hope is."

=== Anglican Communion ===
Churches of the Anglican Communion also follow Augustine and Aquinas. "Faith is a matter of knowledge of God which perfects the intellect... Hope is a matter of the perfection of the will... Love is a matter of perfection itself as love is the perfection of all powers." Richard Hooker said regarding faith, that its "principal object is that eternal verity which hath discovered the treasures of hidden wisdom in Christ"; of hope that its "highest object is that everlasting goodness which in Christ doth quicken the dead"; of charity, that its "final object is that incomprehensible beauty which shineth in the countenance of Christ the Son of the Living God".

== Moral theology ==
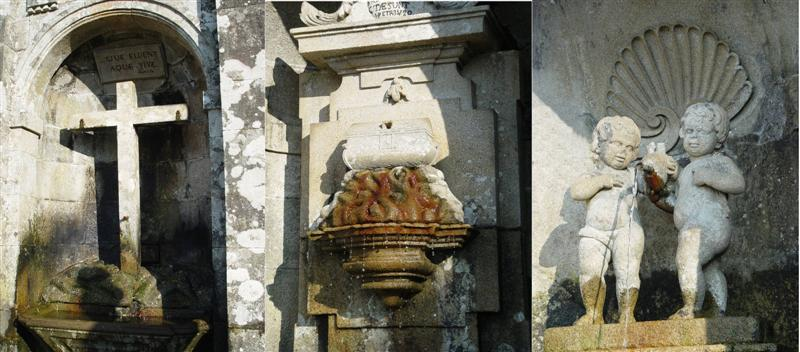
The three Virtues in Bom Jesus, Braga

A person receives the theological virtues by their being "infused"—through Divine grace—into the person. The theological virtues are so named because their object is the divine being (theos).

- Faith is the infused virtue, by which the intellect, by a movement of the will, assents to the supernatural truths of Revelation, not on the motive of intrinsic evidence, but on the sole ground of the infallible authority of God revealing. According to Hugh Pope "[W]hat God says is supremely credible, though not necessarily supremely intelligible for us." The First Vatican Council (III, iii;) stated that "faith is a supernatural virtue by which we with the inspiration and assistance of God's grace, believe those things to be true which He has revealed... although the assent of faith is in no sense blind, yet no one can assent to the Gospel teaching in the way necessary for salvation without the illumination of the Holy Spirit..." It is a gratuitous gift of God.
- Hope is defined as a Divinely infused virtue, which acts upon the will, by which one trusts, with confidence grounded on the Divine assistance, to attain life everlasting. Its opposite is the sin of despair.
- Charity is a Divinely infused virtue, inclining the human will to cherish God for his own sake above all things, and man for the sake of God. To love God is to wish Him all honour and glory and every good, and to endeavour, as far as one can, to obtain it for Him. John 14:23 notes a unique feature of reciprocity that makes charity a veritable friendship of man with God. "Whoever loves me will keep my word, and my Father will love him, and we will come to him and make our dwelling with him." Lack of love may give place to hatred, wrath, or indifference.

== Comparison of cardinal and theological virtues ==
The moral virtues are acquired by practice and habit. Catholic moral theology holds that the theological virtues differ from the cardinal virtues in that they cannot be obtained by human effort, but are infused by God into a person. The Episcopal Church shares this view. "As distinct from the cardinal virtues which we can develop, the theological virtues are the perfection of human powers given by the grace of God." Like the cardinal virtues, an individual who exercises these virtues strengthens and increases them, i.e., they are more disposed to practice them.

Following Augustine, Aquinas also recognized a separate but related type of moral virtue which is also infused by God. The distinction lies both in their source and end. The moral virtue of temperance recognizes food as a good that sustains life, but guards against the sin of gluttony. The infused virtue of temperance disposes the individual to practice fasting and abstinence. The infused moral virtues are connected to the theological virtue of Charity.

Pope Benedict XVI wrote three encyclicals about the theological virtues: Deus caritas est (about love), Spe salvi (about hope), and Lumen fidei (about faith: this encyclical was written both by Pope Benedict XVI and by Pope Francis).

== See also ==
- Christian ethics – Branch of theology that defines virtuous and sinful behavior from a Christian perspective
- Seven deadly sins – Set of vices in Christian theology
- Seven virtues – Seven virtues in Christian tradition
