= Hope (virtue) =

Theological virtue in Christian tradition

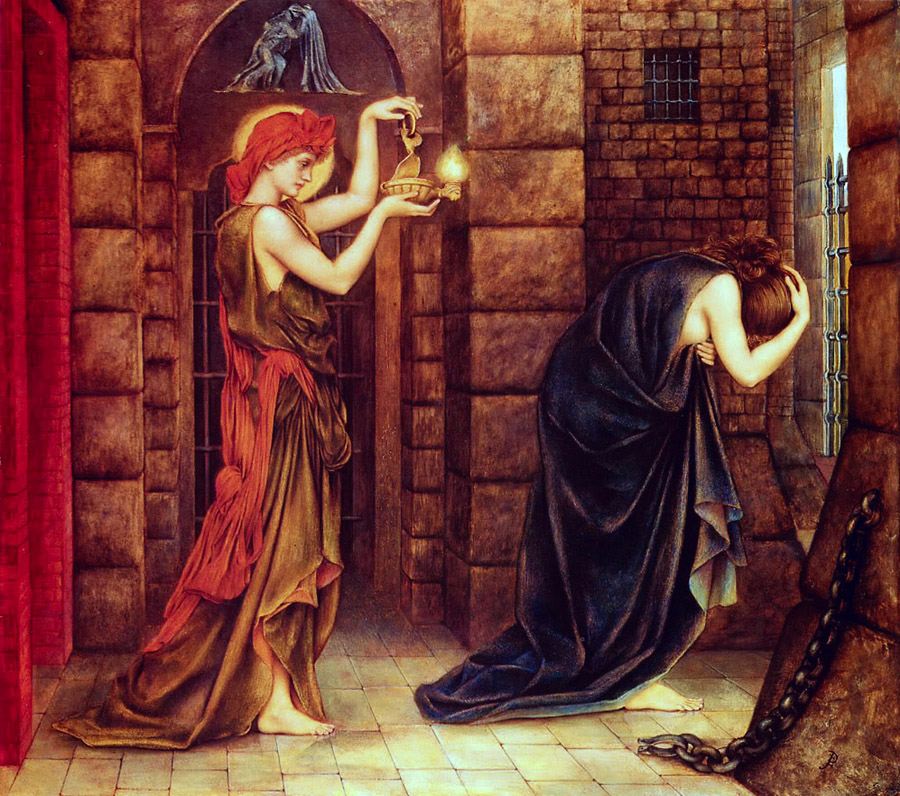
Allegorical personification of Hope: Hope in a Prison of Despair, 1887, by Evelyn De Morgan

Hope (Latin: spes) is one of the three theological virtues in the Christian tradition. Hope is a combination of the desire for something and expectation of receiving it. The Christian virtue is hoping specifically for Divine union and so eternal happiness. While faith is a function of the intellect, hope is an act of the will.

== Overview ==
Thomas Aquinas defined hope as "...a future good, difficult but possible to attain... by means of the Divine Assistance... on Whose help it leans". Hope is always concerned with something in the future. Like the theological virtues of faith and charity, hope finds its "origin, motive, and object" in God. In Hebrews 10:23, Paul the Apostle says, "Let us hold unwaveringly to our confession that gives us hope, for he who made the promise is trustworthy."

The Catholic Encyclopedia defines hope as "the desire of something together with the expectation of obtaining it." Specifically, in the Christian context, this is the hope that God will extend His help to you to "elevate and strengthen [your] will[]" as you strive to "reach eternal felicity." Like the other theological virtues, hope is an infused virtue (defined as one that is implanted in you by God, as opposed to one that you develop yourself through habit). It is not, like good habits in general, the outcome of repeated acts or the product of our own industry. Hope is bestowed by God at baptism.

In the Christian tradition, hope in Christ and faith in Christ are closely linked, with hope having a connotation that means the one with hope has a firm assurance, through the witness of the Holy Spirit, that Christ has promised a better world to those who are His. The Christian sees death not just as the end of a passing life, but as the gateway to a future life without limitation and in all fullness. Pope Benedict XVI states: "Whoever believes in Christ has a future. For God has no desire for what is withered, dead, artificial, and finally discarded: he wants what is fruitful and alive, he wants life in its fullness and he gives us life in its fullness"

Hope can thus sustain one through trials of faith, human tragedies, or difficulties that may otherwise seem overwhelming. Hope is "an anchor of the soul" as referenced in the Epistle to the Hebrews of the New Testament. Hebrews 7:19 also describes the "better hope" of the New Covenant in Christ rather than the Old Covenant of the Jewish law.

Hope is opposed to the sins of despair and presumption; refraining from them is adhering to the negative precept of hope. The positive precept is required when exercising some duties, as in prayer or penance.

Some forms of Quietism denied that a human being should desire anything whatsoever, to such an extent that they denied that hope was a virtue. Quietism was condemned as heresy by Pope Innocent XI in 1687 in the papal bull Coelestis Pastor.

== Quotes ==
- "For in hope we were saved. Now hope that sees for itself is not hope. For who hopes for what one sees?" (Romans 8:24)
- “Trust perfectly in the grace which is offered you in the revelation of Jesus Christ.” (1 Peter 1:13)
- “I know well the plans I have in mind for you says the Lord, plans for your welfare and not for woe so as to give you a future of hope” (Jeremiah 29:11)
- "The Christian who hopes seeks God for himself or herself. In technical language, the formal object of theological hope is God-as-possessed."
- “Nobody can live without hope, even if it were only for the smallest things which give some satisfaction even under the words of conditions, even in poverty, sickness and social failure.”
- "Now faith is the assurance of things hoped for, the conviction of things not seen."

== Act of Hope ==
The Act of Hope is a Catholic prayer:

O my God, relying on Your almighty power and infinite mercy and promises, I hope to obtain pardon of my sins, the help of Your grace, and life everlasting through the merits of Jesus Christ, my Lord and Redeemer. Amen.

Positive psychology has studied some positive psychological attributes for a healthy mental life, such as happiness, encouragement, love, forgiveness, and hope. One of the most prominent authors developing the role of hope in psychology is Charles R. Snyder, who even has created several measures of private and social hope.

According to Snyder, psychological hope consists of three fundamental components: goals, pathways, and agency. This implies that hope necessitates, firstly, an individual having a goal that is deemed desirable, feasible, yet not currently fulfilled (belief); secondly, envisioning a pathway to attain that goal; and thirdly, possessing the capability to act on that pathway toward the defined goal. A lack of agency results in mere "wishful hope," whereas elevated levels of conviction or commitment lead to an "aspirational hope."

== See also ==
- abandon hope all ye who enter here
- Optimism – Positive mental attitude
- Spe Salvi – 2007 Papal encyclical by Pope Benedict XVI
