= Charles R. Snyder =

American psychologist (1944–2006)

Charles Richard "Rick" Snyder (1944–2006) was an American psychologist who specialized in positive psychology. He was a Wright Distinguished Professor of Clinical Psychology at the University of Kansas and editor of the Journal of Social and Clinical Psychology.

Snyder was internationally known for his work at the interface of clinical, social, personality and health psychology. His theories pertained to how people react to personal feedback, the human need for uniqueness, the ubiquitous drive to excuse transgressions and, most recently, the hope motive.

== Education ==
Snyder obtained his PhD from Southern Methodist University, then had doctoral training in clinical psychology at Vanderbilt University, and then postdoctoral training at the Langley Porter Institute.

== Career ==
His entire professional career was at the University of Kansas. He was a pioneer in the field of positive psychology, and wrote the first textbook in that field, Positive Psychology.

He was best known for his work on hope and forgiveness, and also developed theories explaining how people react to personal feedback, to the human need for uniqueness, and to the drive to excuse and forgive transgressions. His theory of hope emphasizes goal-directed thinking, where a person uses both pathways thinking (the perceived capacity to find routes to their desired goals) and agency thinking (the necessary motivation to use those routes). His analysis of the motivational forces – excuse-making and forgiveness – allowed individuals to disconnect themselves from past negative experiences and connect themselves to hope, the possibilities of the future. In 2000, he demonstrated his hope theory on Good Morning America by conducting a live experiment with the show's correspondents.

== Publications ==
=== Books ===
- Uniqueness: The Human Pursuit of Difference 1980, C.R. Snyder and Howard L. Fromkin
- Excuses: Masquerades in Search of Grace 1983, C.R. Snyder, Raymond L. Higgins and Rita J. Stuckey
- Coping with Negative Life Events 1987, Edited by C.R. Snyder and Carol E. Ford
- Self-Handicapping: The Paradox That Isn't 1990, Raymond L. Higgins, C.R. Snyder and Steve Berglas
- The Psychology of Hope: You Can Get There From Here 1994, C.R. Snyder
- Social Cognitive Psychology, History and Current Domains 1997, David F. Barone, James E. Maddux, and C.R. Snyder
- Making Hope Happen: A Workbook for Turning Possibilities Into Reality 1999, Diane McDermott and C.R. Snyder
- Coping, The Psychology of What Works 1999, Edited by C.R. Snyder
- Handbook of Hope: Theory, Measures and Applications 2000, Edited by C.R. Snyder
- Handbook of Psychological Change: Psychotherapy Processes and Practices for the 21st Century 2000, Edited by C.R. Snyder and Rick E. Ingram
- The Great Big Book of Hope: Help Your Children Achieve Their Dreams 2000, Diane McDermott and C.R. Snyder
- Coping with Stress 2001, Edited by C.R. Snyder
- Positive Psychological Assessment: A Handbook of Models and Measures 2003 Edited by C.R. Snyder and Shane J. Lopez
- Positive Psychology: The Scientific and Practical Explorations of Human Strength 2008, C.R. Snyder, Shane J. Lopez and Jennifer T. Pedrotti
- Oxford Handbook of Positive Psychology 2009, 2011 Edited by C.R. Snyder and Shane J. Lopez

== Honors ==
Snyder received 27 teaching awards at the university, state, and national level, and 31 research awards, including the 2002 Balfour Jeffrey Award for Research Achievement in Humanities and Social Science and the 2001 Guilford Press Award for Pioneering Scholarly Contributions in Clinical/Social/Personality Psychology.

Snyder was two times awarded KU's Outstanding Progressive Educator award (known as the HOPE award) by the undergraduate seniors. He became a fellow of the American Psychological Association's Division of Teaching in 1995. Snyder served on the PhD dissertation committees for 41 students, and received APA's Raymond Fowler Outstanding Graduate Mentor Award in 2000. In 2005, he received an honorary doctorate from Indiana Wesleyan University. His research on uniqueness was the subject of a Sunday Doonesbury cartoon sequence.
