= Charity (Christian virtue) =

One of the seven theological virtues

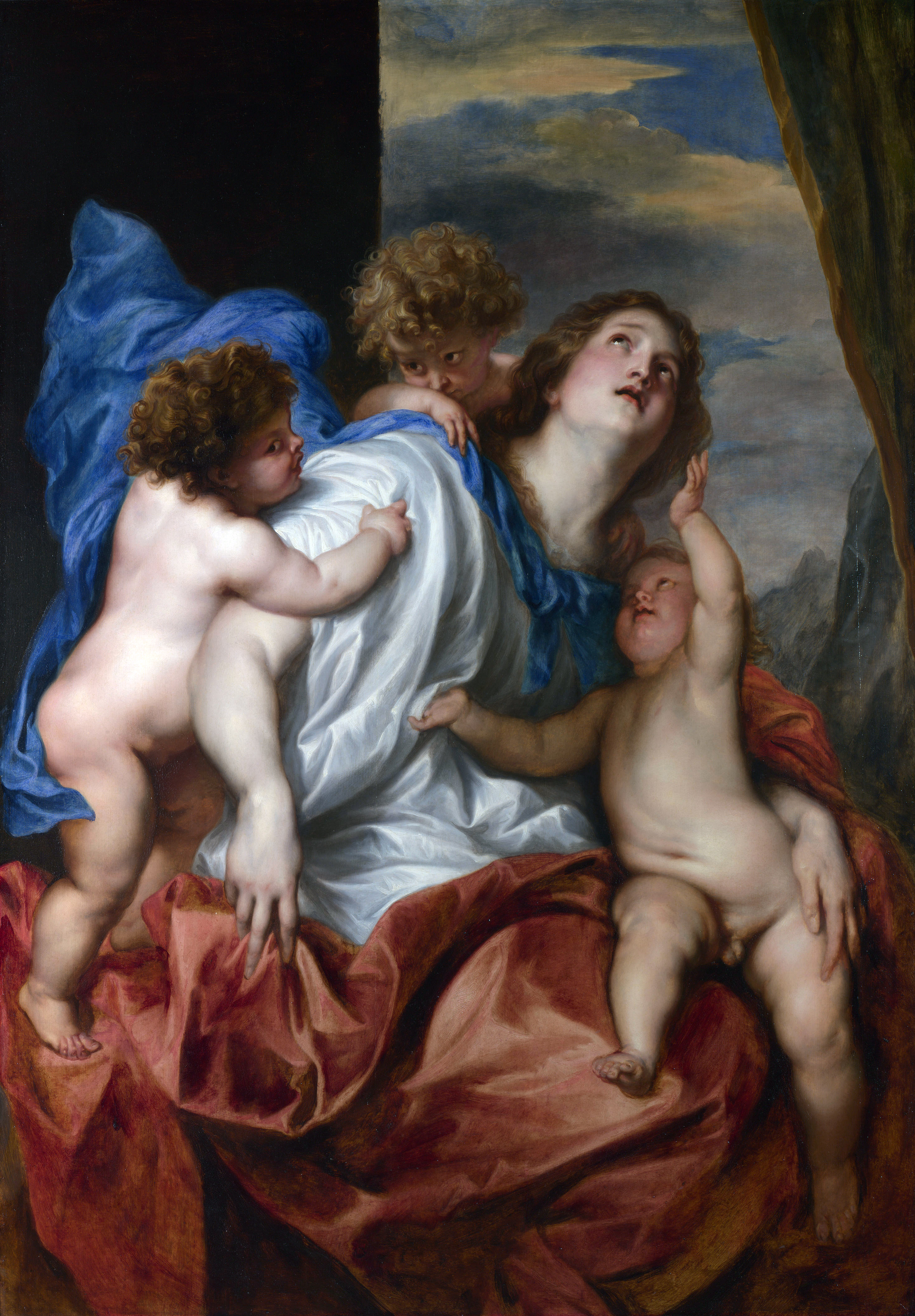
Allegorical personification of Charity as a mother with three infants by Anthony van Dyck, (ca. 1627–1628)

In Christian theology, charity (Latin: caritas) is considered one of the seven virtues and was understood by Thomas Aquinas as "the friendship of man for God", which "unites us to God". He holds it as "the most excellent of the virtues". Aquinas further holds that "the habit of charity extends not only to the love of God, but also to the love of our neighbor".

The Catechism of the Catholic Church defines "charity" as "the theological virtue by which we love God above all things for His own sake, and our neighbor as ourselves for the love of God".

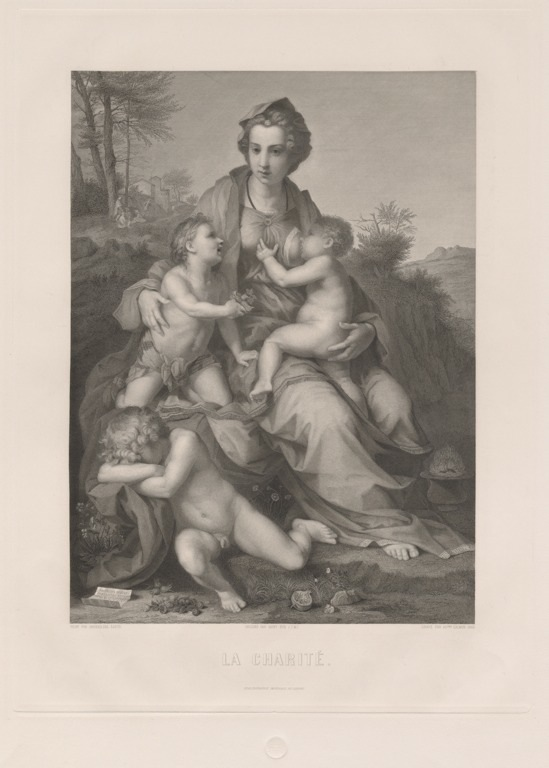
Louis Adolphe Salmon after Andrea del Sarto, Charity, 1863, etching and engraving

== As an altruistic love ==
The phrase Deus caritas est from 1 John 4:8 (1 John 4:8)—or Θεὸς ἀγάπη ἐστίν (Theos agapē estin) in the original Greek is translated in the King James Version as: "God is love", and in the Douay-Rheims bible as: "God is charity" (1 John 4:8). Thomas Aquinas does not simply equate charity with "love", which he holds to be a passion, not a virtue. The King James Version uses both the words charity and love to translate the idea of caritas/ἀγάπη (agapē): sometimes it uses one, then sometimes the other, for the same concept. Most other English translations, both before and since, do not; instead, throughout they use the same more direct English word love. Love can have other meanings in English, but as used in the New Testament it almost always refers to the virtue of caritas.

Many times when charity is mentioned in English-language bibles, it refers to "love of God", which is a spiritual love that is extended from God to man and then reflected by man, who is made in the image of God, back to God. God gives man the power to act as God acts (God is love), man then reflects God's power in his own human actions towards others. One example of this movement is "charity shall cover the multitude of sins" (1 Peter 4:8, 1 Peter 4:8). "The practice of charity brings us to act toward ourselves and others out of love alone, precisely because each person has the dignity of a beloved child of God."

== As a theological virtue ==
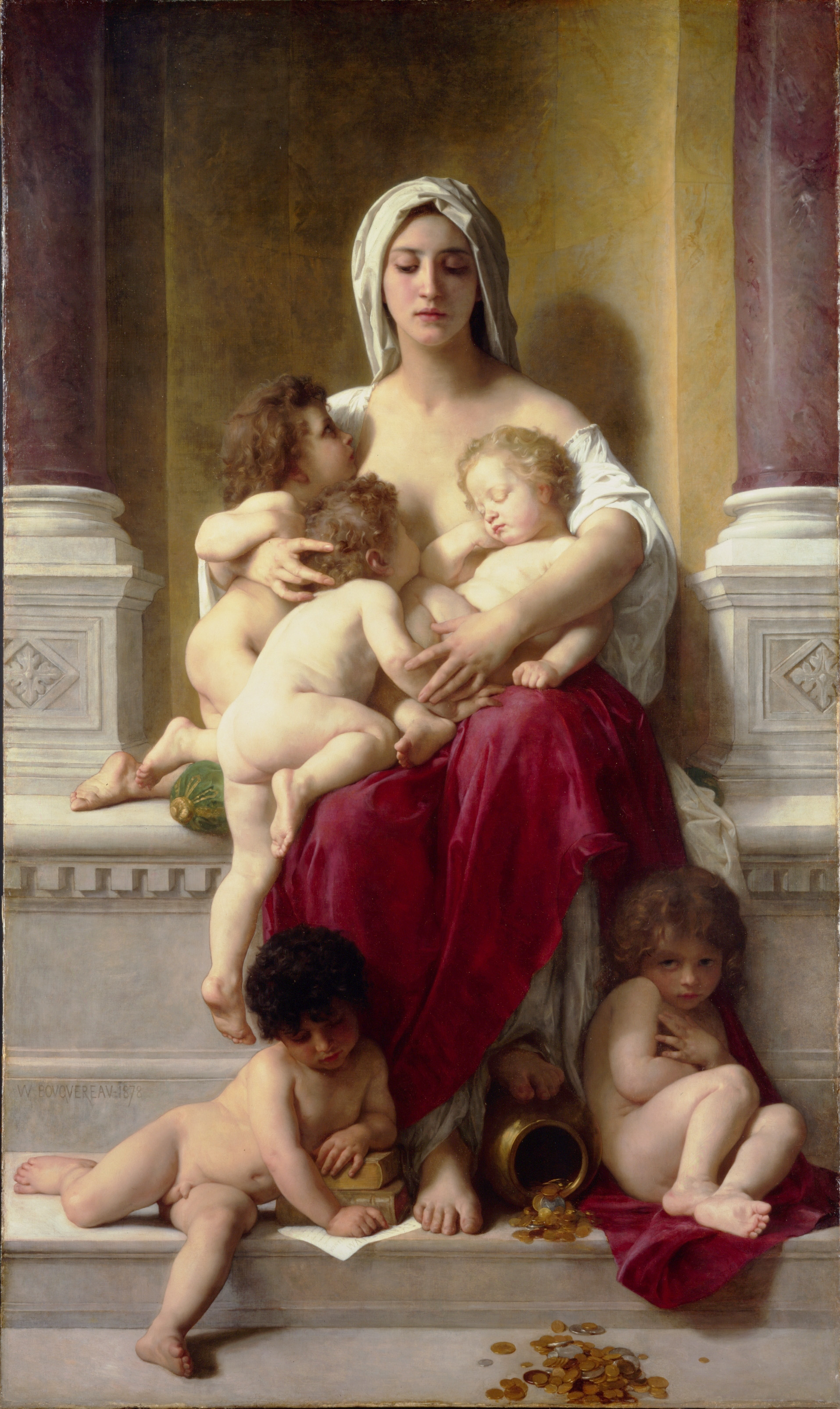
Charity by William-Adolphe Bouguereau

Charity is held to be the ultimate perfection of the human spirit because it both glorifies and reflects the nature of God. Confusion can arise from the multiple meanings of the English word "love". As with other theological virtues, charity is divinely infused into the soul; it resides in the will. According to Aquinas, charity is an absolute requirement for happiness, which he holds as man's last goal.

Charity has two parts: love of God and love of man, which includes both love of one's neighbor and one's self.

In 1 Corinthians 13, Paul places the greatest emphasis on charity (love). "So faith, hope, love remain, these three; but the greatest of these is love." He describes it this way:

Though I speak with the tongues of men and of angels, and have not charity, I am become as sounding brass, or a tinkling cymbal. And though I have the gift of prophecy, and understand all mysteries, and all knowledge; and though I have all faith, so that I could remove mountains, and have not charity, I am nothing. And though I bestow all my goods to feed the poor, and though I give my body to be burned, and have not charity, it profiteth me nothing. Charity never faileth: but whether there be prophecies, they shall fail; whether there be tongues, they shall cease; whether there be knowledge, it shall vanish away. For we know in part, and we prophesy in part. But when that which is perfect is come, then that which is in part shall be done away.... And now abideth faith, hope, charity, these three; but the greatest of these is charity.

The fruits of charity are joy, peace, and mercy.

In December 2005, Pope Benedict XVI issued the encyclical Deus caritas est, in which he discussed "... the love which God lavishes upon us and which we in turn must share with others."

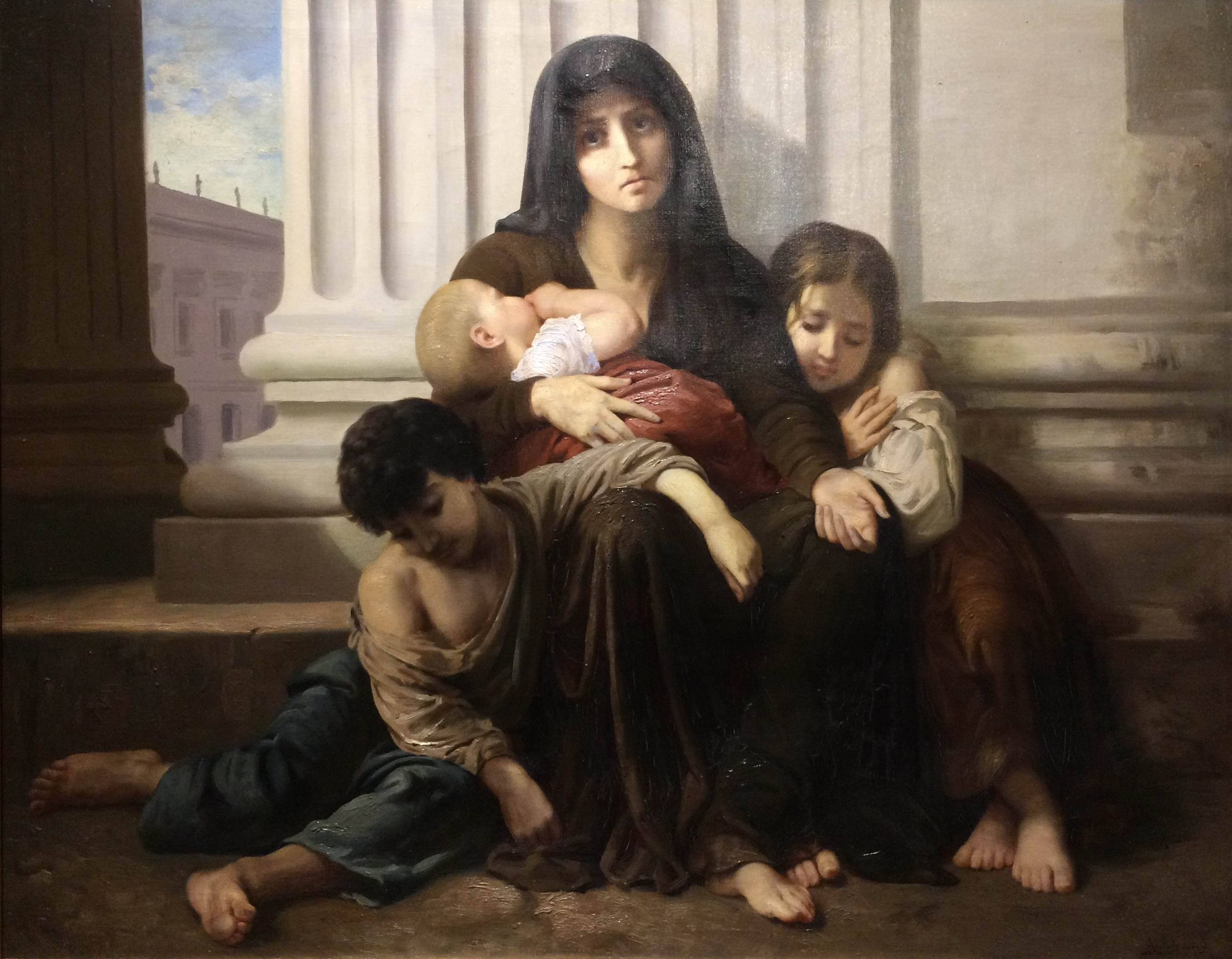
Charity (c. 1920), oil painting by Antonio Salguero Salas

Based on the Matthew 25's Parable of The Sheep and the Goats, the early Church saw the love of the poor (periptochias) as the crown jewel of the virtues. Cappadocian father St. Gregory of Nazianzus wrote that

It is not at all an easy task to discover the one virtue that surpasses all others and to give it the scepter and palm, just as it is not easy in a meadow fragrant with many blossoms to find the most fragrant and beautiful.

After considering many of the Christian virtues, he concludes that

following Paul and Christ himself, we must regard charity as the first and greatest of the commandments since it is the very sum of the Law and the Prophets, [and] its most vital part I find is the love of the poor...

== See also ==
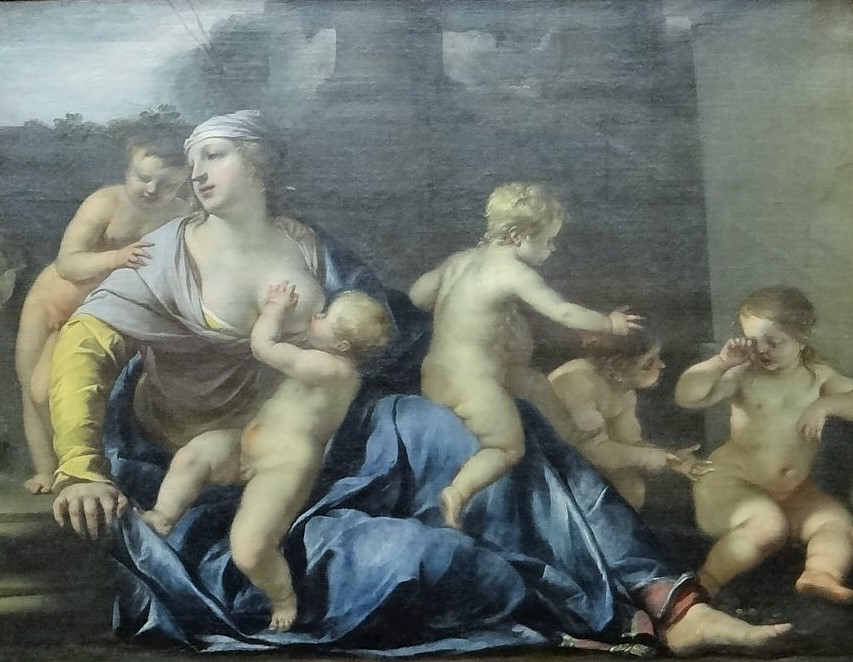
Charity by Jacques Blanchard, 1633

- Altruism – Concern for the well-being of others
- Charity (practice) – Voluntary giving of help to those in need
- The other Capital Virtues – Seven virtues in Christian tradition
  - Chastity – Ethic concept of temperance related to sexuality
  - Diligence – Carefulness and persistent effort or work
  - Humility – Quality of being humble
  - Kindness – Type of behaviour
  - Patience – Ability to endure difficult circumstances
  - Temperance – Cardinal virtue of control over excess
- Dāna – Concept of charity in Indian religions
- Great Commandment – First of two commandments cited by Jesus
- Love for enemies
- Loving-kindness and similar or related concepts:
  - Agape – Greek word for love
  - Chesed – Hebrew word referring to love or kindness
  - Mettā – Buddhist term meaning "loving-kindness"
- Ren (Confucianism) – Highest Confucian virtue
- Seven Deadly Sins – Set of vices in Christian theology
- Virtue – Positive trait or quality deemed to be morally good
- Zidqa – Alms in Mandaeism

== Sources ==
- Aquinas, Thomas (1917) [1485]. "Second Part of the Second Part" . Summa Theologiae. See Questions 23-46
- Bossy, John (1985). Christianity in the West 1400–1700. Oxford. p. 168.
- Deharbe, Joseph (1912). "The Commandments in General and the Chief Commandment of Charity." . A Complete Catechism of the Catholic Religion. Translated by Rev. John Fander. Schwartz, Kirwin & Fauss.
- Slater S.J., Thomas (1925). "Book V: Part III: On Charity" . A manual of moral theology for English-speaking countries. Burns Oates & Washbourne Ltd.
- Sollier, Joseph Francis (1910). "Love (Theological Virtue)" . In Herbermann, Charles (ed.). Catholic Encyclopedia. Vol. 9. New York: Robert Appleton Company.
