= Apologue =

Brief fable or allegorical story

An apologue or apolog (from the Greek ἀπόλογος, a "statement" or "account") is a brief fable or allegorical story with pointed or exaggerated details, meant to serve as a pleasant vehicle for a moral doctrine or to convey a useful lesson without stating it explicitly. Unlike a fable, the moral is more important than the narrative details. As with the parable, the apologue is a tool of rhetorical argument used to convince or persuade.

== Overview ==
Among the best known ancient and classical examples are that of Jotham in the Book of Judges (9:7-15); "The Belly and its Members," by the patrician Agrippa Menenius Lanatus in the second book of Livy; and perhaps most famous of all, those of Aesop. Well-known modern examples of this literary form include George Orwell's Animal Farm and the Br'er Rabbit stories derived from African and Cherokee cultures and recorded and synthesized by Joel Chandler Harris. The term is applied more particularly to a story in which the actors or speakers are either various kinds of animals or are inanimate objects.

An apologue is distinguished from a fable in that there is always some moral sense present in the former, which there need not be in the latter. An apologue is generally dramatic, and has been defined as "a satire in action."

== Apologue vs parable ==
An apologue differs from a parable in several respects. A parable is equally an ingenious tale intended to correct manners, but it can be true in the sense that "when this kind of actual event happens among men, this is what it means and this is how we should think about it", while an apologue, with its introduction of animals and plants, to which it lends ideas, language and emotions, contains only metaphoric truth: "when this kind of situation exists anywhere in the world, here is an interesting truth about it." The parable reaches heights to which the apologue cannot aspire, for the points in which animals and nature present analogies to man are principally those of his lower nature (hunger, desire, pain, fear, etc.), and the lessons taught by the apologue seldom therefore reach beyond prudential morality (keep yourself safe, find ease where you can, plan for the future, don't misbehave or you'll eventually be caught and punished), whereas the parable aims at representing the relations between man and existence or higher powers (know your role in the universe, behave well towards all you encounter, kindness and respect are of higher value than cruelty and slander). It finds its framework in the world of nature as it actually is, and not in any parody of it, and it exhibits real and not fanciful analogies.

The apologue seizes on that which humans have in common with other creatures, and the parable on that which we have in common with a greater existence. Still, in spite of the difference of moral level, Martin Luther thought so highly of apologues as counselors of virtue that he edited and revised Aesop and wrote a characteristic preface to the volume. The parable is always blunt and devoid of subtlety, and requires no interpretation; the apologue by nature necessitates at least some degree of reflection and thought to achieve understanding, and in this sense it demands more of the listener than the parable does.

Some commentators have attempted to relegate the apologue in literary and artistic importance. As René Wellek observes, Hegel in his Aesthetics (mediated to at least some extent by Hotho's account) consigns the apologue, parable, and proverb, along with the fable, the epigram, the riddle, and all didactic and descriptive poetry as "minor forms" of literature that do not qualify as art at all.

== Origins ==
The origin of the apologue is extremely ancient and comes from the Middle East and its surrounding area (Persia, Asia Minor, Egypt, etc.), which is the Classical fatherland of everything connected with allegory, metaphor and imagination. Veiled truth was often necessary in the Middle East, particularly among the slaves, who dared not reveal their minds too openly. The two fathers of apologue in the West were slaves, namely Aesop and Phaedrus. Leading later writers of apologues were Giambattista Basile in Italy; La Fontaine in France; John Gay and Robert Dodsley in England; Christian Fürchtegott Gellert, Gotthold Ephraim Lessing and Friedrich von Hagedorn in Germany; Tomas de Iriarte in Spain; Ivan Krylov in Russia and Leonid Hlibov in Ukraine.

== Structure ==
Length is not an essential matter in the definition of an apologue. Those of La Fontaine are often very short, as, for example, "Le Coq et la Perle" ("The Cock and the Pearl").

"A cock was once strutting up and down the farmyard among the hens when suddenly he espied something shining amid the straw. “Ho! ho!” quoth he, “that’s for me,” and soon rooted it out from beneath the straw. What did it turn out to be but a Pearl that by some chance had been lost in the yard? “You may be a treasure,” quoth Master Cock, “to men that prize you, but for me I would rather have a single barley-corn than a peck of pearls.”

On the other hand, in the romances of Reynard the Fox we have medieval apologues arranged in cycles, and attaining epical dimensions. An Italian fabulist, Corti, is said to have developed an apologue of "The Talking Animals" reaching twenty-six cantos.

== In literature ==
La Motte, writing at a time when this species of literature was universally admired, attributes its popularity to the fact that it manages and flatters amour-propre by inculcating virtue in an amusing manner without seeming to dictate or insist. This was the ordinary 18th-century view of the matter, but Rousseau contested the educational value of instruction given in this indirect form.

A work by P. Soullé, La Fontaine et ses devanciers (1866), is a history of the apologue from the earliest times until its final triumph in France.

Montesquieu wrote a propos his Persian Letters "There are certain truths of which it is not enough to persuade, but which must be made to be felt. Such are the moral verities. Perhaps a bit of history will be more touching than subtle philosophy."

André Alexis' Fifteen Dogs: an Apologue, an extended prosimetric example of apologue, was published in 2015, notably winning that year's Giller Prize and subsequently earning Alexis the Windham-Campbell Literature Prize.

== See also ==
- Traditional story
- Epilogue, a piece of writing at the end of a work of literature, usually used to bring closure to the work.
