= Corte (surname) =

Corte is an Italian surname. Notable people with the surname include:

- Cesare Corte (1554–1613), Italian painter of the Renaissance period
- Enrico Corte (born 1963), Italian contemporary artist
- Frank Corte Jr., U.S. businessman and politician
- Valerio Corte (1530 –1580), Italian painter and alchemist of the Renaissance

== See also ==
- Corte (disambiguation)
- Cortes (surname)
- Corti
