= Corte =

Corte may refer to:

- Corte, a commune in Corsica, France
  - Arrondissement of Corte, a district in Corsica, France
- USC Corte, a French football team
- Corte (surname)

== See also ==
- Corte Brugnatella, a commune in the province of Piacenza, Italy
- Corte de' Cortesi con Cignone, a commune in the province of Cremona, Italy
- Corte de' Frati, a town and commune in the province of Cremona, Italy
- Corte Franca, a town and commune in the province of Brescia, Italy
- Corte Palasio, a town and commune in the province of Lodi, Italy
- Corte Madera, California, a town in the United States
- Corto (disambiguation)
- Corte-Real (disambiguation)
- Cortes (disambiguation)
- Cortez (disambiguation)
