= Angelina Cabras =

Italian mathematician and physicist

- Born: 23 December 1898; Oristano, Italy
- Died: 19 June 1993 (aged 94); Cagliari, Italy
- Education: University of Turin; University of Cagliari
- Occupations: mathematician, physicist

Angelina Cabras (23 December 1898 – 19 June 1993) was an Italian mathematician and physicist. She earned degrees in mathematics from the University of Turin in 1924 and in physics from the University of Cagliari in 1927. She obtained a position in mathematical physics at Cagliari, later moving to the institute of theoretical mechanics there. Her research concerned higher dimensional rigid body dynamics, the theory of relativity, and inductance.

She was an invited speaker at the International Congress of Mathematicians in 1928.

She died in Cagliari in 1993.
