= Traditional story =

Story about traditions

Traditional stories, or stories about traditions, differ from both fiction and nonfiction in that the importance of transmitting the story's worldview is generally understood to transcend an immediate need to establish its categorization as imaginary or factual. In the academic circles of literature, religion, history, and anthropology, categories of traditional story are important terminology to identify and interpret stories more precisely. Some stories belong in multiple categories and some stories do not fit into any category.

== Anecdote ==
An anecdote is a short and amusing or interesting story about a biographical incident. It may be as brief as the setting and provocation of a bon mot. An anecdote is always presented as based on a real incident involving actual persons, whether famous or not, usually in an identifiable place; whether authentic or not, it has verisimilitude or truthiness. Over time, modification in reuse may convert a particular anecdote to a fictional piece, one that is retold but is "too good to be true". Sometimes humorous, anecdotes are not jokes, because their primary purpose is not simply to evoke laughter, but to reveal a truth more general than the brief tale itself, or to delineate an institutional or character trait in such a light that it strikes in a flash of insight to the very essence. Novalis observed, "An anecdote is a historical element — a historical molecule or epigram." A brief monologue beginning "A man pops in a bar ..." will be a joke. A brief monologue beginning "Once J. Edgar Hoover popped in a bar ..." will be an anecdote. An anecdote thus is closer to the tradition of the parable than the patently invented fable with its animal characters and generic human figures — but it is distinct from the parable in the historical specificity which it claims.

Anecdotes are often of satirical nature. Under the totalitarian regime in the Soviet Union numerous political anecdotes circulating in society were the only way to reveal and denounce vices of the political system and its leaders. They made fun of such personalities as Lenin, Khrushchev, Brezhnev, and other Soviet leaders. In contemporary Russia there are many anecdotes about Vladimir Putin.

The word 'anecdote' (in Greek: "unpublished", literally "not given out") comes from Procopius of Caesarea, the biographer of Justinian I, who produced a work entitled Ἀνέκδοτα (Anekdota, variously translated as Unpublished Memoirs or Secret History), which is primarily a collection of short incidents from the private life of the Byzantine court. Gradually, the term anecdote came to be applied (Note: Its first appearance in English is of 1676 (OED).) to any short tale utilized to emphasize or illustrate whatever point the author wished to make. (Note: Note that in the context of Estonian, Lithuanian, Bulgarian and Russian humor anecdote refers to any short humorous story without the need of factual or biographical origins.)

== Apologue ==
An apologue or apolog (from the Greek ἀπόλογος, a "statement" or "account") is a brief fable or allegorical story with pointed or exaggerated details, meant to serve as a pleasant vehicle for a moral doctrine or to convey a useful lesson without stating it explicitly. It is like a parable, except that it contains supernatural elements like a fable, often the personification of animals or plants. Unlike a fable, the moral is more important than the narrative details. As with the parable, the apologue is a tool of rhetorical argument used to convince or persuade.

Among the best known ancient and classical examples are that of Jotham in the Book of Judges (9:7-15); "The Belly and its Members", by the patrician Agrippa Menenius Lanatus in the second book of Livy; and perhaps most famous of all, those of Aesop. Well-known modern examples of this literary form include George Orwell's Animal Farm and the Br'er Rabbit stories derived from African and Cherokee cultures and recorded and synthesized by Joel Chandler Harris. The term is applied more particularly to a story in which the actors or speakers are either various kinds of animals or are inanimate objects. An apologue is distinguished from a fable in that there is always some moral sense present in the former, which there need not be in the latter. An apologue is generally dramatic, and has been defined as "a satire in action."

An apologue differs from a parable in several respects. A parable is equally an ingenious tale intended to correct manners, but it can be true in the sense that "when this kind of actual event happens among men, this is what it means and this is how we should think about it", while an apologue, with its introduction of animals and plants, to which it lends ideas, language and emotions, contains only metaphoric truth: "when this kind of situation exists anywhere in the world, here is an interesting truth about it." The parable reaches heights to which the apologue cannot aspire, for the points in which animals and nature present analogies to man are principally those of his lower nature (hunger, desire, pain, fear, etc.), and the lessons taught by the apologue seldom therefore reach beyond prudential morality (keep yourself safe, find ease where you can, plan for the future, do not misbehave or you'll eventually be caught and punished), whereas the parable aims at representing the relations between man and existence or higher powers (know your role in the universe, behave well towards all you encounter, kindness and respect are of higher value than cruelty and slander). It finds its framework in the world of nature as it actually is, and not in any parody of it, and it exhibits real and not fanciful analogies. The apologue seizes on that which humans have in common with other creatures, and the parable on that which we have in common with a greater existence. Still, in spite of the difference of moral level, Martin Luther thought so highly of apologues as counselors of virtue that he edited and revised Aesop and wrote a characteristic preface to the volume. The parable is always blunt and devoid of subtlety, and requires no interpretation; the apologue by nature necessitates at least some degree of reflection and thought to achieve understanding, and in this sense it demands more of the listener than the parable does.

The origin of the apologue is extremely ancient and comes from the Middle East and its surrounding area (Persia, Asia Minor, Egypt, etc.), which is the Classical fatherland of everything connected with allegory, metaphor and imagination. Veiled truth was often necessary in the Middle East, particularly among the slaves, who dared not reveal their minds too openly. It is noteworthy that the two fathers of apologue in the West were slaves, namely Aesop and Phaedrus. La Fontaine in France; Gay and Dodsley in England; Gellert, Lessing and Hagedorn in Germany; Tomas de Iriarte in Spain, and Krylov in Russia, are leading modern writers of apologues.

Length is not an essential matter in the definition of an apologue. Those of La Fontaine are often very short, as, for example, "Le Coq et la Perle" ("The Cock and the Pearl"). On the other hand, in the romances of Reynard the Fox we have medieval apologues arranged in cycles, and attaining epical dimensions. An Italian fabulist, Corti, is said to have developed an apologue of "The Talking Animals" reaching twenty-six cantos.

La Motte, writing at a time when this species of literature was universally admired, attributes its popularity to the fact that it manages and flatters amour-propre by inculcating virtue in an amusing manner without seeming to dictate or insist. This was the ordinary 18th-century view of the matter, but Rousseau contested the educational value of instruction given in this indirect form.

A work by P. Soullé, La Fontaine et ses devanciers (1866), is a history of the apologue from the earliest times until its final triumph in France.

Montesquieu wrote a propos his Persian Letters "There are certain truths of which it is not enough to persuade, but which must be made to be felt. Such are the moral verities. Perhaps a bit of history will be more touching than subtle philosophy."

== Chivalric romance ==
As a literary genre of high culture, romance or chivalric romance is a style of heroic prose and verse narrative that was popular in the aristocratic circles of High Medieval and Early Modern Europe. They were fantastic stories about marvel-filled adventures, often of a knight errant portrayed as having heroic qualities, who goes on a quest. Popular literature also drew on themes of romance, but with ironic, satiric or burlesque intent. Romances reworked legends, fairy tales, and history to suit the readers' and hearers' tastes, but by c.1600 they were out of fashion, and Miguel de Cervantes famously satirised them in his novel Don Quixote. Still, the modern image of "medieval" is more influenced by the romance than by any other medieval genre, and the word medieval invokes knights, distressed damsels, dragons, and other romantic tropes.

Originally, romance literature was written in Old French, Anglo-Norman and Occitan, later, in English and German. During the early 13th century romances were increasingly written as prose. In later romances, particularly those of French origin, there is a marked tendency to emphasize themes of courtly love, such as faithfulness in adversity.

During the Gothic Revival, from ca. 1800 the connotations of "romance" moved from the magical and fantastic to somewhat eerie "Gothic" adventure narratives.

== Creation myth ==
A creation myth is a symbolic narrative of how the world began and how people first came to inhabit it. They develop in oral traditions and therefore typically have multiple versions; and they are the most common form of myth, found throughout human culture. In the society in which it is told, a creation myth is usually regarded as conveying profound truths, metaphorically, symbolically and sometimes even in a historical or literal sense. They are commonly, although not always, considered cosmogonical myths—that is they describe the ordering of the cosmos from a state of chaos or amorphousness.

Creation myths often share a number of features. They often are considered sacred accounts and can be found in nearly all known religious traditions. They are all stories with a plot and characters who are either deities, human-like figures, or animals, who often speak and transform easily. They are often set in a dim and nonspecific past, what historian of religion Mircea Eliade termed in illo tempore ("at that time"). Also, all creation myths speak to deeply meaningful questions held by the society that shares them, revealing of their central worldview and the framework for the self-identity of the culture and individual in a universal context.

== Etiological myth ==
An etiological myth, or origin myth, is a myth intended to explain the origins of cult practices, natural phenomena, proper names and the like, or create a mythic history for a place or family. For example, the name Delphi and its associated deity, Apollon Delphinios, are explained in the Homeric Hymn which tells of how Apollo carried Cretans over the sea in the shape of a dolphin (delphis) to make them his priests. While Delphi is actually related to the word delphus ("womb"), many etiological myths are similarly based on folk etymology (the term "Amazon", for example). In the Aeneid (published circa 17 BC), Vergil claims the descent of Augustus Caesar's Julian clan from the hero Aeneas through his son Ascanius, also called Iulus. The story of Prometheus' sacrifice-trick in Hesiod's Theogony relates how Prometheus tricked Zeus into choosing the bones and fat of the first sacrificial animal rather than the meat to justify why, after a sacrifice, the Greeks offered the bones wrapped in fat to the gods while keeping the meat for themselves.

One type of origin myth is the creation myth (or cosmogonic myth), which describes the creation of the world. However, many cultures have stories set after the cosmogonic myth, which describe the origin of natural phenomena and human institutions within a preexisting universe.

In Western classical scholarship, the word aition (from the Ancient Greek αἴτιον, "cause") is sometimes used for a myth that explains an origin, particularly how an object or custom came into existence.

== Fable ==
A fable, as a literary genre, is a succinct fictional story, in prose or verse, that features animals, legendary creatures, plants, inanimate objects, or forces of nature that are anthropomorphised, and that illustrates a moral lesson (a "moral"), which may at the end be expressed explicitly in a pithy maxim.

A fable differs from a parable in that the latter excludes animals, plants, inanimate objects, and forces of nature as actors that assume speech and other powers of humankind.

Usage has not always been so clearly distinguished. In the King James Version of the New Testament, "μύθος" ("mythos") was rendered by the translators as "fable" in First and Second Timothy, in Titus and in First Peter.

== Factoid ==
A factoid is a questionable or spurious (unverified, false, or fabricated) statement presented as a fact, but with no veracity. The word can also be used to describe a particularly insignificant or novel fact, in the absence of much relevant context. The word is defined by the Compact Oxford English Dictionary as "an item of unreliable information that is repeated so often that it becomes accepted as fact".

Factoid was coined by Norman Mailer in his 1973 biography of Marilyn Monroe. Mailer described a factoid as "facts which have no existence before appearing in a magazine or newspaper", and created the word by combining the word fact and the ending -oid to mean "similar but not the same". The Washington Times described Mailer's new word as referring to "something that looks like a fact, could be a fact, but in fact is not a fact".

Factoids may give rise to, or arise from, common misconceptions and urban legends.

== Fairy tale ==
A fairy tale (pronounced /ˈfeəriˌteɪl/) is a type of short story that typically features folkloric fantasy characters, such as fairies, goblins, elves, trolls, dwarves, giants, merfolk or gnomes, and usually magic or enchantments. However, only a small number of the stories refer to fairies. The stories may nonetheless be distinguished from other folk narratives such as legends (which generally involve belief in the veracity of the events described) and explicitly moral tales, including beast fables.

In less technical contexts, the term is also used to describe something blessed with unusual happiness, as in "fairy tale ending" (a happy ending) or "fairy tale romance" (though not all fairy tales end happily). Colloquially, a "fairy tale" or "fairy story" can also mean any far-fetched story or tall tale.

In cultures where demons and witches are perceived as real, fairy tales may merge into legends, where the narrative is perceived both by teller and hearers as being grounded in historical truth. However, unlike legends and epics, they usually do not contain more than superficial references to religion and actual places, people, and events; they take place once upon a time rather than in actual times.

Fairy tales are found in oral and in literary form. The history of the fairy tale is particularly difficult to trace because only the literary forms can survive. Still, the evidence of literary works at least indicates that fairy tales have existed for thousands of years, although not perhaps recognized as a genre; the name "fairy tale" was first ascribed to them by Madame d'Aulnoy in the late 17th century. Many of today's fairy tales have evolved from centuries-old stories that have appeared, with variations, in multiple cultures around the world. Fairy tales, and works derived from fairy tales, are still written today.

The older fairy tales were intended for an audience of adults, as well as children, but they were associated with children as early as the writings of the précieuses; the Brothers Grimm titled their collection Children's and Household Tales, and the link with children has only grown stronger with time.

Folklorists have classified fairy tales in various ways. The Aarne-Thompson classification system and the morphological analysis of Vladimir Propp are among the most notable. Other folklorists have interpreted the tales' significance, but no school has been definitively established for the meaning of the tales.

A fairy tale with a tragic rather a happy ending is called anti-fairy tale.

== Folklore ==
Folklore (or lore) consists of legends, music, oral history, proverbs, jokes, popular beliefs, fairy tales, stories, tall tales, and customs that are the traditions of a culture, subculture, or group. It is also the set of practices through which those expressive genres are shared. The study of folklore is sometimes called folkloristics. The word 'folklore' was first used by the English antiquarian William Thoms in a letter published in the London journal The Athenaeum in 1846. In usage, there is a continuum between folklore and mythology. Stith Thompson made a major attempt to index the motifs of both folklore and mythology, providing an outline into which new motifs can be placed, and scholars can keep track of all older motifs.

Folklore can be divided into four areas of study: artifact (such as voodoo dolls), describable and transmissible entity (oral tradition), culture, and behavior (rituals). These areas do not stand alone, however, as often a particular item or element may fit into more than one of these areas.

== Folkloristics ==
Folkloristics is the term preferred by academic folklorists for the formal, academic discipline devoted to the study of folklore. The term itself derives from the nineteenth-century German designation folkloristik (i.e., folklore). Ultimately, the term folkloristics is used to distinguish between the materials studied, folklore, and the study of folklore, folkloristics. In scholarly usage, folkloristics represents an emphasis on the contemporary, social aspects of expressive culture, in contrast to the more literary or historical study of cultural texts.

== Ghost story ==
A ghost story may be any piece of fiction, or drama, or an account of an experience, that includes a ghost, or simply takes as a premise the possibility of ghosts or characters' belief in them. Colloquially, the term can refer to any kind of scary story. In a narrower sense, the ghost story has been developed as a short story format, within genre fiction. It is a form of supernatural fiction and specifically of weird fiction, and is often a horror story. While ghost stories are often explicitly meant to be scary, they have been written to serve all sorts of purposes, from comedy to morality tales. Ghosts often appear in the narrative as sentinels or prophets of things to come. Whatever their uses, the ghost story is in some format present in all cultures around the world, and may be passed down orally or in written form.

== Joke ==
A joke is something spoken, written, or done with humorous intention. Jokes may have many different forms, e.g., a single word or a gesture (considered in a particular context), a question-answer, or a whole short story. The word "joke" has a number of synonyms.

To achieve their end, jokes may employ irony, sarcasm, word play and other devices. Jokes may have a punch line, i.e. an ending to make it humorous.

A practical joke or prank differs from a spoken one in that the major component of the humour is physical rather than verbal (for example placing salt in the sugar bowl).

== Legend ==
A legend (Latin, legenda, "things to be read") is a narrative of human actions that are perceived both by teller and listeners to take place within human history and to possess certain qualities that give the tale verisimilitude. Legend, for its active and passive participants includes no happenings that are outside the realm of "possibility", defined by a highly flexible set of parameters, which may include miracles that are perceived as actually having happened, within the specific tradition of indoctrination where the legend arises, and within which it may be transformed over time, in order to keep it fresh and vital, and realistic.

The Brothers Grimm defined legend as folktale historically grounded. A modern folklorist's professional definition of legend was proposed by Timothy R. Tangherlini in 1990:

Legend, typically, is a short (mono-) episodic, traditional, highly ecotypified (Note: That is to say, specifically located in place and time.) historicized narrative performed in a conversational mode, reflecting on a psychological level a symbolic representation of folk belief and collective experiences and serving as a reaffirmation of commonly held values of the group to whose tradition it belongs."

== Mythology ==
The term mythology can refer either to the study of myths, or to a body or collection of myths. As examples, comparative mythology is the study of connections between myths from different cultures, whereas Greek mythology is the body of myths from ancient Greece. In the field of folkloristics, a myth is defined as a sacred narrative explaining how the world and humankind came to be in their present form and how customs, institutions and taboos were established. Many scholars in other fields use the term "myth" in somewhat different ways. In a very broad sense, the word can refer to any story originating within traditions.

== Oral tradition ==
Oral tradition and oral lore is cultural material and tradition transmitted orally from one generation to another. The messages or testimony are verbally transmitted in speech or song and may take the form, for example, of folktales, sayings, ballads, songs, or chants. In this way, it is possible for a society to transmit oral history, oral literature, oral law and other traditional knowledge across generations without a writing system.

A narrower definition of oral tradition is sometimes appropriate. Sociologists might also emphasize a requirement that the material is held in common by a group of people, over several generations, and might distinguish oral tradition from testimony or oral history. In a general sense, "oral tradition" refers to the transmission of cultural material through vocal utterance, and was long held to be a key descriptor of folklore (a criterion no longer rigidly held by all folklorists). As an academic discipline, it refers both to a set of objects of study and a method by which they are studied—the method may be called variously "oral traditional theory", "the theory of Oral-Formulaic Composition" and the "Parry-Lord theory" (after two of its founders; see below) The study of oral tradition is distinct from the academic discipline of oral history, which is the recording of personal memories and histories of those who experienced historical eras or events. It is also distinct from the study of orality, which can be defined as thought and its verbal expression in societies where the technologies of literacy (especially writing and print) are unfamiliar to most of the population.

== Parable ==
A parable is a succinct story, in prose or verse, that illustrates one or more moral, religious, instructive, or normative principles or lessons. It differs from a fable in that fables use animals, plants, inanimate objects, and forces of nature as actors that assume speech and other powers of humankind, while parables generally feature human characters. It is a type of analogy.

Some scholars of the Canonical gospels and the New Testament apply the term "parable" only to the parables of Jesus, though that is not a common restriction of the term. Parables such as "The Prodigal Son" are central to Jesus' teaching method in both the canonical narratives and the apocrypha.

== Political myth ==
A political myth is an ideological explanation for a political phenomenon that is believed by a social group.

In 1975, Henry Tudor defined it in Political Myth published by Macmillan. He said

A myth is an interpretation of what the myth-maker (rightly or wrongly) takes to be hard fact. It is a device men adopt in order to come to grips with reality; and we can tell that a given account is a myth, not by the amount of truth it contains, but by the fact that it is believed to be true, and above all, by the dramatic form into which it is cast ... What marks a myth as being political is its subject matter ... [P]olitical myths deal with politics ... A political myth is always the myth of a particular group. It has a hero or protagonist, not an individual, but a tribe, a nation, a race, a class ... [and] it is always the group which acts as the protagonist in a political myth.

In 2001, Christopher G. Flood described a working definition of a political myth as

an ideologically marked narrative which purports to give a true account of a set of past, present, or predicted political events and which is accepted as valid in its essentials by a social group.

== Tall tale ==
A tall tale is a story with unbelievable elements, related as if it were true and factual. Some such stories are exaggerations of actual events, for example fish stories such as, "That fish was so big, why, I tell ya, it nearly sank the boat when I pulled it in!" Other tall tales are completely fictional tales set in a familiar setting, such as the European countryside, the American Old West, the Canadian Northwest, or the beginning of the Industrial Revolution.

Tall tales are often told so as to make the narrator seem to have been a part of the story. They are usually humorous or good-natured. The line between myth and tall tale is distinguished primarily by age; many myths exaggerate the exploits of their heroes, but in tall tales the exaggeration looms large, to the extent of becoming the whole of the story.

== Urban legend ==
An urban legend, urban myth, urban tale, or contemporary legend, is a form of modern folklore consisting of stories that may or may not have been believed by their tellers to be true. As with all folklore and mythology, the designation suggests nothing about the story's veracity, but merely that it is in circulation, exhibits variation over time, and carries some significance that motivates the community in preserving and propagating it.

Despite its name, an urban legend does not necessarily originate in an urban area. Rather, the term is used to differentiate modern legend from traditional folklore in pre-industrial times. For this reason, sociologists and folklorists prefer the term contemporary legend.

Urban legends are sometimes repeated in news stories and, in recent years, distributed by e-mail. People frequently allege that such tales happened to a "friend of a friend"; so often, in fact, that "friend of a friend" ("FOAF") has become a commonly used term when recounting this type of story.

Some urban legends have passed through the years with only minor changes to suit regional variations. One example is the story of a woman killed by spiders nesting in her elaborate hairdo. More recent legends tend to reflect modern circumstances, like the story of people ambushed, anesthetized, and waking up minus one kidney, which was surgically removed for transplantation (a story which folklorists refer to as "The Kidney Heist").
