= Enrico Corte =

Italian contemporary artist

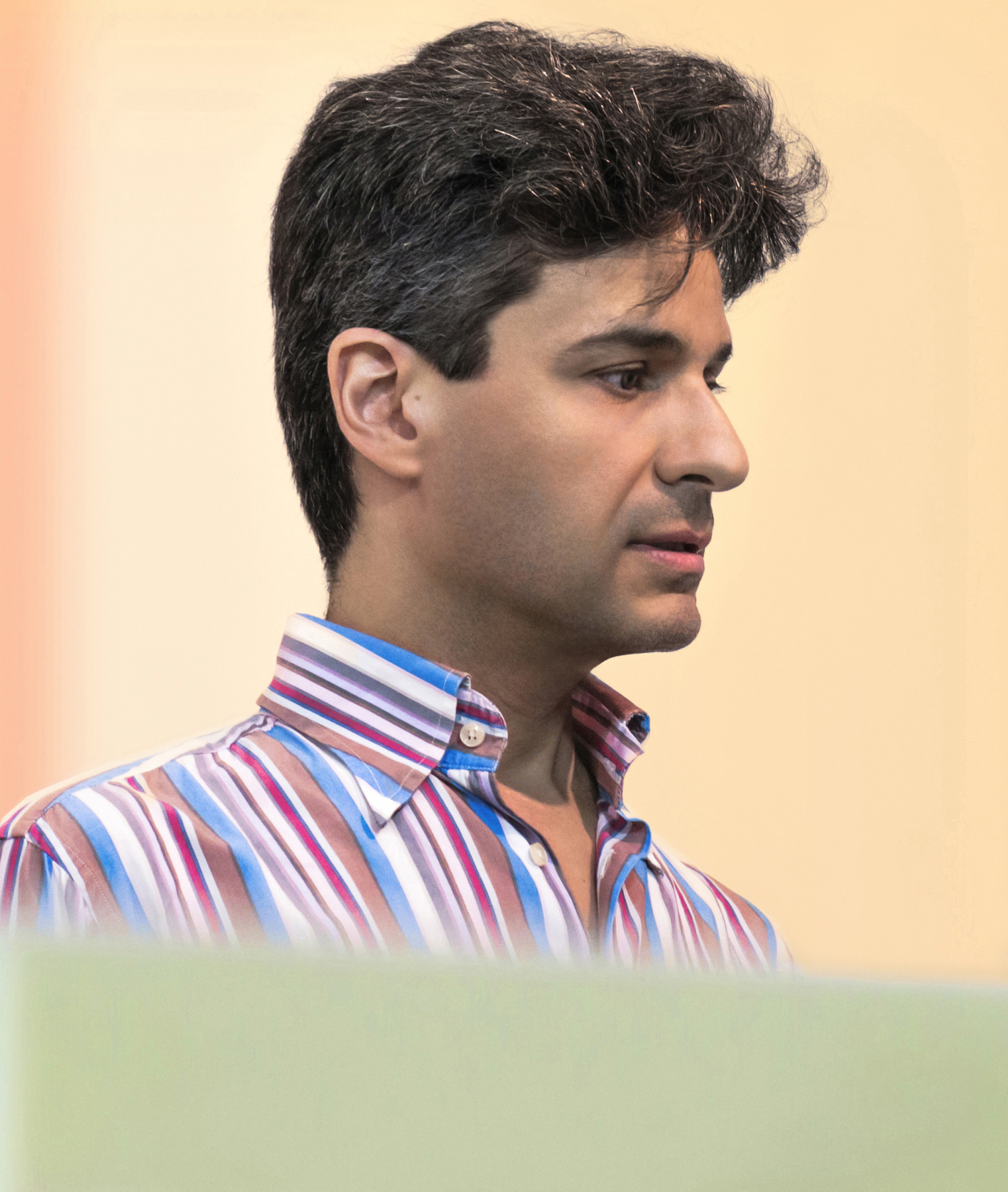
- Enrico Corte in 2015. Photo by Francesca Manca di Villahermosa.
- Born: 21 June 1963 (age 63); Cagliari, Italy
- Education: University of Cagliari, Master's degree in History of Contemporary Art
- Known for: Painting, sculpture, photography, drawing, video art, music composition
- Website: enricocorte.net

Enrico Corte (Italian: [enˈriːko ˈkorte]; born 21 June 1963) is an Italian contemporary artist. He works in the fields of painting, sculpture, drawing, video art and photography. His exhibitions often include multimedia installations that mix diverse genres and form relationships both with the surrounding area and the viewing public by means of ever-changing combinations. He has lived for extended periods of time in Rome, London, Berlin, Paris and New York, always immersing himself in the contemporary culture and assimilating the tensions of the metropolitan counter-cultures. His works can be found in both private and public collections in Europe and the USA.

Some recurring themes constitute the artist’s poetic core. One element is the so-called "impossibility of the Tragic" within the system of contemporary art. Another theme is the co-existence of creation and destruction in the process of realizing a work, along with the analysis of the “dark side” of creativity which often coincides with the self-destruction of the artist’s personality. A frequent theme found in many of Corte’s works is the relationship between official artistic culture and the “underground” ferment that develops in urban alternative countercultures or subcultures. The manifold theme of sex in general and, in particular, the relationship between pleasure and pain, are explored by Corte without restraint or prejudice; he himself ties the wide variety of artistic techniques and genres of his work to a genderqueer standpoint experienced personally by the artist.

== Life and career ==
Enrico Corte was born in Cagliari, on the island of Sardinia, Italy. He completed his courses of studies at the artistic high school in Cagliari, where he met a classmate, Andrea Nurcis, an artist with whom he began an artistic dialogue and partnership that has lasted to the present day. Corte began exhibiting in 1980; in 1982 he held his first solo exhibition at the Galleria Comunale d’Arte Moderna in Cagliari, where he juxtaposed his works directly with those of the artists in the Gallery’s permanent collection, such as Giulio Paolini, Bridget Riley, Enrico Castellani, and Piero Gilardi. In addition to visual art, he was influenced by international literature, cinema, theatre and, above all, the history of music. In 1983, his interest in the cinema and theatre led to an encounter with the film director Mario Martone, who put him in touch with the Idra Duarte gallery in Naples, an experimental space run by artists where Corte and Nurcis organized a double solo exhibition in 1986. They received the attention of the art critics Enrico Crispolti and Filiberto Menna, who invited them to exhibit at the 1986 Rome Quadriennale. The Quadriennale aimed to take stock of the Italian visual art in the mid-1980s and included such artists as Francesco Clemente, Michelangelo Pistoletto, Giuseppe Penone, Mimmo Paladino, Mario Merz. Through to his presence in the Quadriennale, Corte was introduced to some of the representatives of the cultural and artistic world in Rome, including Alighiero Boetti, Jannis Kounellis, Enzo Cucchi, Gino De Dominicis and, in particular, the multimedia artist Luigi Ontani. Ontani and Corte belonged to different generations but shared a common sensitivity and culture; they developed a friendship that inspired Ontani to write a presentation in the form of a poem of Corte’s first solo exhibition in Rome, at the Planita gallery in 1989. Enrico Crispolti will deepen his analysis of Corte's work in the 1994 book Il Novecento 3. Le ultime ricerche.

In 1988, Corte obtained his degree (Laurea, in Italian) from the university in the history of contemporary art with a thesis on the Austrian body artist Günter Brus, whom he met and interviewed in Graz in 1987. He then moved to Rome, where he established a studio with Andrea Nurcis. To finance his early projects, Corte worked as a 3D commercial artist, scenographer and actor, collaborating with, among others, the experimental film director Franco Brocani; his work with Brocani would later find a place in his art. In Rome, Corte met several artists of international fame, including Alberto Burri, Marina Abramović, Maurizio Cattelan, Joseph Kosuth, Andres Serrano. Corte also met photographer Joel-Peter Witkin, with whom he briefly worked as an assistant in 1997, looking for transgender models along the streets of Rome. During the 1990s, Corte became part of the "nuova scena" (new scene) of Italian art, being chosen by the critic Achille Bonito Oliva for a series of exhibitions in Rome and Milan, by the critics Luca Beatrice and Cristiana Perrella for the Equinozio d’Autunno exhibition at Castello di Rivara, near Turin, and by the critic Gianluca Marziani for the exhibitionTrends, organized in 2001 by the Galleria d'Arte Moderna, Bologna. He also began to make trips to New York City.

In 1999, Swiss critic Harald Szeemann, director of the 48th Venice Biennale, invited Corte and Nurcis to organize as an artist/curator a program within the Oreste project in the Room A of the Italian pavilion. The name they gave to their specific project was "Orestecinema: networking as a privileged method." The main topics dealt with the themes of international counterculture, creative hacking and political and cultural dissent. In addition to Room A of the Italian pavilion, Orestecinema expanded to other public spaces, including the Aula Magna of the Università Iuav di Venezia and the Chiostro of Tolentini, Venice. With the sponsorship of J. Walter Thompson, the two artists organized a series of film and video screenings and panel discussions between a number of international intellectuals, journalists, musicians, radio/television/theater directors, and the public of contemporary art. It put into practice Corte's desire to escape the "self-indulgent individualism of the artist," a stance Corte relates to the Gramscian school of thought. To secure the participation of three radio and television directors from the clandestine and main counter-information news station B92 in Belgrade – a city that at the time was at war – Corte had to seek diplomatic assistance from the Italian ambassador to Belgrade and financial support from George Soros' Open Society Foundations. The result was an exhibition that included a countercultural critique of Slobodan Milošević, his regime and the civil war underway in the former Yugoslavia – just 200 kilometres from the Biennale. The press conference that followed, along with a number of interviews with guests of Orestecinema, was transcribed and published in the book "Oreste at the Venice Biennale."

In 2003, Corte began a working relationship with the Buia Gallery in New York, taking part in the Young Italian Genome group show. Corte left Rome in 2008 and moved to Bologna for a brief period, after which he chose to concentrate his work in a studio/house in the countryside near Ravenna. In 2017, the critic Gianluca Marziani organized a double retrospective exhibition of Corte and Nurcis in the Palazzo Collicola Arti Visive museum in Spoleto, Umbria. The exhibition, entitled ExcerptⒶ, celebrated 40 years of the artists’ work, occupying three floors of the museum. ExcerptⒶ caught the attention of the director of the Galleria Nazionale d'Arte Moderna in Rome, Cristiana Collu, who in February 2018 organized a lecture with the two artists in the Galleria Nazionale where the entire exhibition was illustrated and discussed with the audience. On the occasion of the ExcerptⒶ exhibition and the artist’s lecture in the Galleria Nazionale, the aspect of Corte’s work in the field of musical composition emerged – an activity on which he has been concentrating in recent years.

== Works ==
=== The Botanical Rarities series (1981–present) ===
Throughout his career, Corte has collaborated with other artists in order to break out of what he refers to as «the self-indulgent individualism of the artist». The multimedia installation Botanical Rarities, created with the artist Andrea Nurcis in 1981, is an example of the type of ongoing collaborative work that has evolved alongside his solo works. Since the first installation of vegetomorphic sculptures, drawings and musical soundtrack in the Orto Botanico dell'Università di Cagliari, from time to time the artists re-elaborate the original themes in order to present the same ideas in different forms using various techniques. So far vinyl LPs, audio CDs, videos, jewellery and various gadgets inspired by the 1981 exhibition have been produced. The “celebratory” pretext was intended ironically, not adulatory, but when viewed in its totality, it does celebrate the lasting friendship the two artists continue to enjoy.

=== Photographic works of the 1980s and 1990s ===
The young Corte’s approach to photography is characterized by its low-cost production and open-minded approach to the real, which one reviewer called that of "a tourist of existence". His photography has also been defined as a sort of "negative narcissism," experienced through redefining the conventional concepts of "identity" and "dignity". Typical of the latter are works that could be wrongly intended to "search for scandal". For example, in some of them, he is photographed standing precariously on the ledge of public buildings (Youthanasia, 1981; Cheese, 1981). Another self-portrait represents the artist’s face spattered with seminal liquid (Drawing [Sketch], 1982), and in another one, someone urinates on his face (Idolatrine, 1981). Throughout the 1990s, Corte would occasionally include photography in his sculptures or other plastic works to re-contextualize them in a wider multimedia context.

=== Double Faces and Cross Fades works (1986–1989) ===
In the second half of the 1980s, Corte produced two series of works: the Double Face series, consisting of thirty-five pieces, followed by the Cross Fades series, consisting of forty pieces. In the former, the artist altered the traditional way a picture is displayed, hanging panels attached to steel cables in the centre of the exhibiting area. The panels were painted on both sides, often with images and subjects that are quite different from the point of view of colour or figurative representation. The viewer is invited to walk around the picture as it hangs in a void to discover the conceptual tie between the two sides of the work. Often, the images depicted emerge from the surface, standing out like altorilievi or jutting sculptures. The Cross Fades series began in 1987 and represent an extension of the works in Double Face: the pictures in this series look as if they are hanging on the wall in a traditional fashion but they are divided into two panels joined by hinges so that they can be opened and closed like a book (or rather, like a Japanese book: from right to left). One of the two panels is fixed to the wall, while the other is movable and can be opened or closed by the viewer on the hinges. When the works in the Cross Fades series are closed, that is to say, when one panel is folded over the other, all that the viewer can see is a black square hanging on the wall; it is necessary to use one’s hands to open the panels in order to be able to see the images painted within.

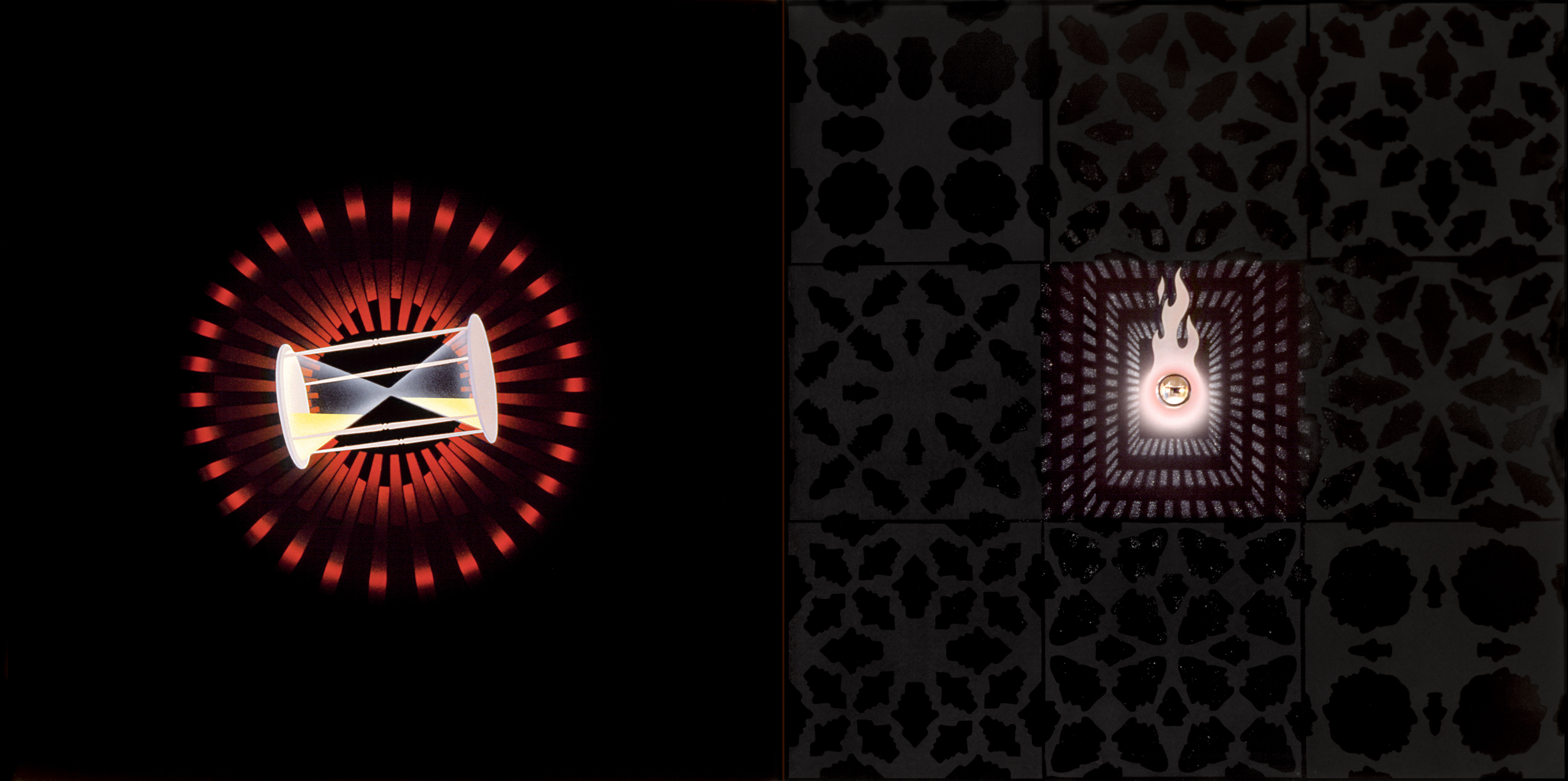
Cross Fade - The Abstraction of the Petroleum, 1987. Nitrocellulose lacquer, silver enamel, black tissue paper cutouts and a concave mirror on two openable panels in reflecting black formica, joined by hidden hinges. Open: 100x200x2,5 cm; closed: 100x100x5 cm. Private collection, Osaka.

=== The Abstraction of the Void series and the Devotees and Wannabes series (1993–1998) ===
The Abstraction of the Void is a series of small sculptures made of metal, resin and other materials. It is inspired by erotic accessories, reinterpreted through a wide range of aesthetic solutions. For example, the artist modifies the form of a butt plug with precious, unexpected details that have nothing to do with the erotic object’s original purpose, yet still maintain its possible anal use. The concept of “emptiness”, which Corte takes from classical art, takes on an ironic connotation in this series of works, projecting the aesthetic dimension of sculpture into new areas, including the concepts of pleasure and pain, formal refinements and scatological eroticism. The Devotees and Wannabes series involves a group of small and medium-small metal sculptures designed by the artist as artificial body parts – fingers, limbs, etc. – missing as a result of voluntary amputation. Corte references the practice by groups of people who in the early 1980s were labelled in the jargon of analytic psychology, as well as U.S. urban subculture, as devotees (people attracted by amputations), or wannabes (people who practice self-amputation). These fetishists performed voluntary self-mutilation for erotic or merely decorative reasons as they searched for a new aesthetic of the body. Corte’s sculptures are not simply “prostheses” imitating the original form of the missing body part; rather, they take on free aesthetic connotations with the addition of elements which widen the possibilities for the use of the artificial part itself. For both the Abstraction of the Void and the Devotees and Wannabes series, Corte made a set of “promo pictures” of the sculptures, placing the objects in singular poses and settings and photographing them as if they were advertisements for a product. These promo pictures were considered an art form in and of themselves and not simply a commercial o promotion strategy.

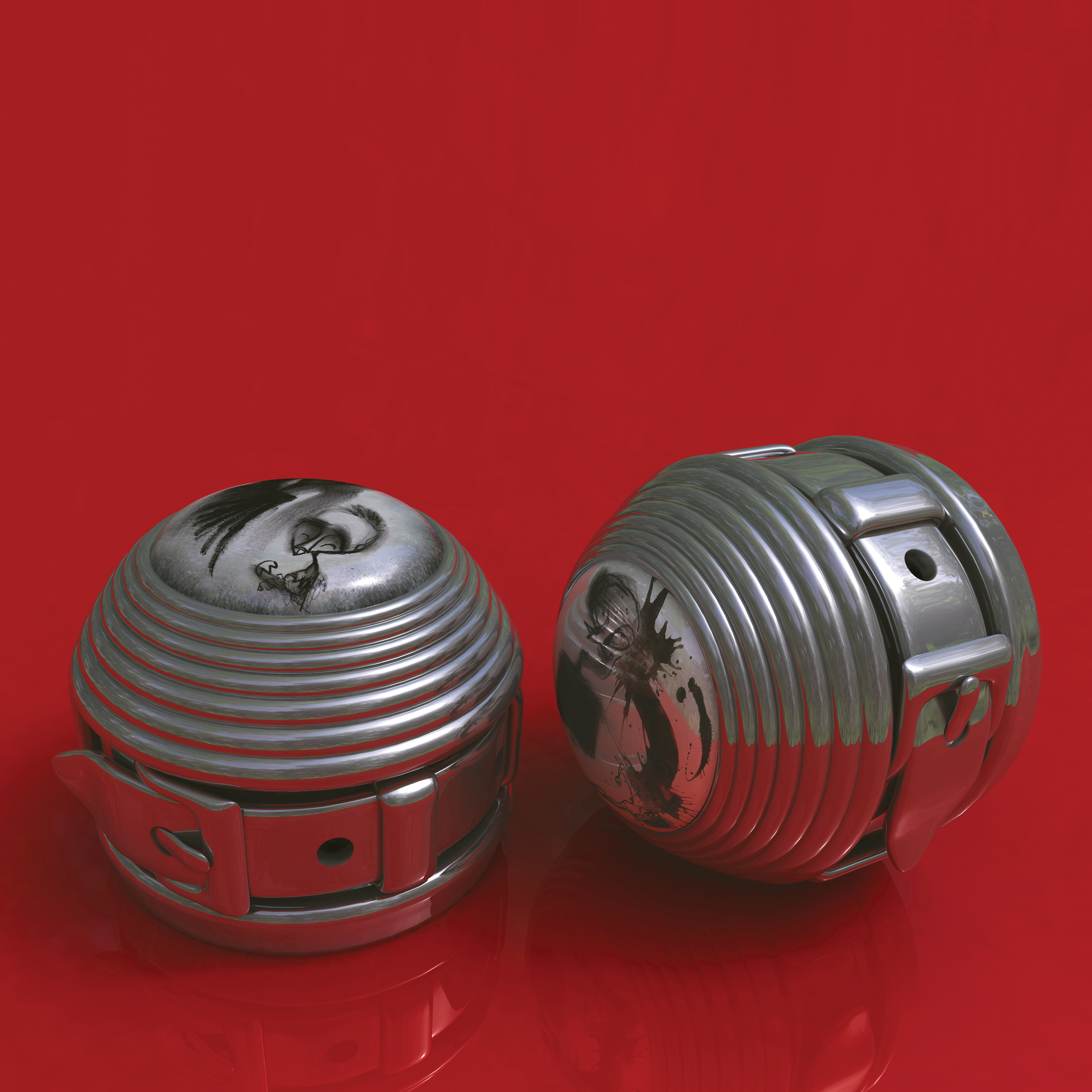
LWD - RWD (Left Wrist - Right Wrist Disarticulation). Promo picture from the Devotees and Wannabes series, 1993-98. Two prototypes of substitutive sculptures for voluntary hand amputations. Stainless steel, photoceramics with reproduction of charcoal and ink drawings. Each sculpture: 7,5x7x7 cm. Private collection, Milan.

=== The Art Brothel series (1995) ===
The series Art Brothel consists of 25 photographs of various sizes with plastic laminate backings. The artist’s intention was to create an ironic, desecrating celebration of the system of contemporary art with an "overtone of parody" and using references to cinema. Corte created the Art Brothel series in 1995, the year of the Venice Biennale centenary, so it is not surprising that this celebration is his first ironic reference. On the backstage of an actual film set, where Corte worked as a scenographer and actor, a group of professional male, female and transgender high-class prostitutes plays in sequences that allude to well-known paintings, techniques or artistic trends chronicling the history of art. The artist himself also appears in these sequences. To create the photographic series, Corte projected the sequences on a cinema screen and then re-photographed them. The resulting photos were later printed and cropped by the artist, sometimes leaving at their edges a small portion of the screen on which the sequences were projected. Also, French subtitles, apparently disconnected from the various scenes, have been superimposed on the photographs. The titles of the single photos are indicative of the artist’s intent, but the series contains more subtle references to cinematographic art. For example, the film set is located in a showroom on Via Veneto – the famous street in Rome that was featured in the 1960 film by Federico Fellini La Dolce Vita, and the show room itself belongs to an Italian architect and interior designer of villas owned by Sylvester Stallone.

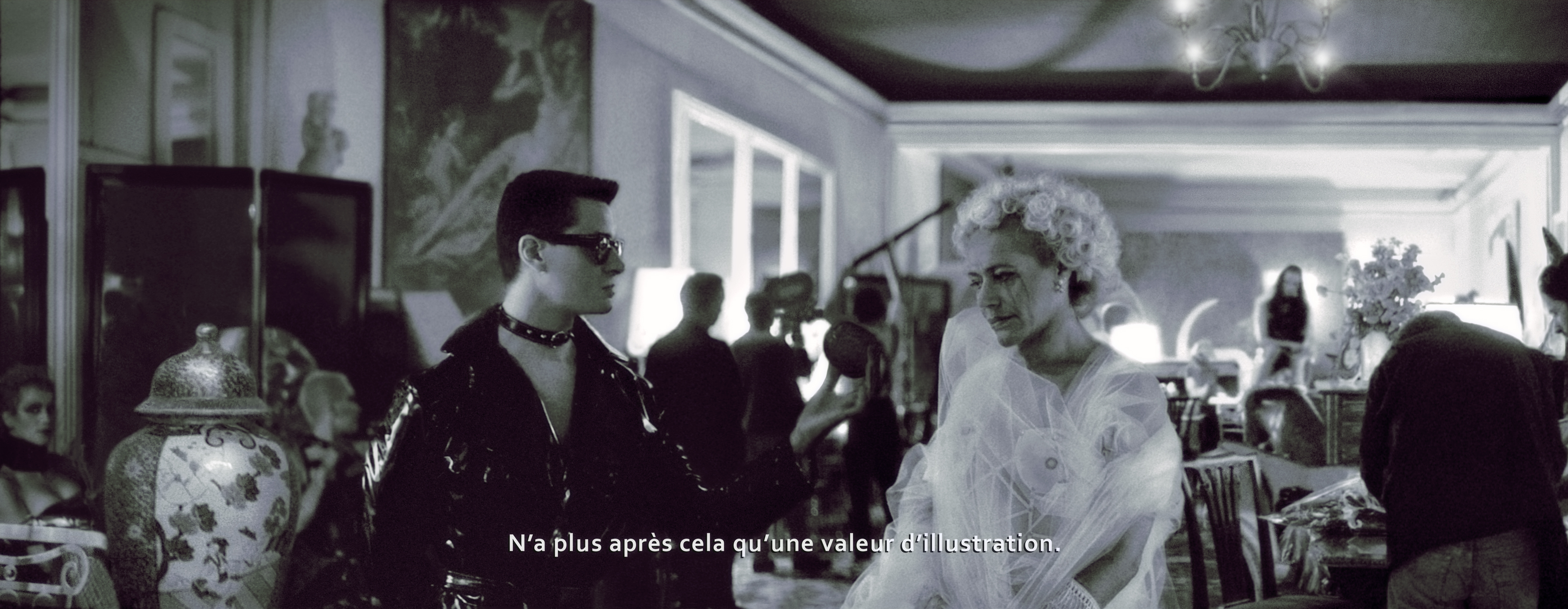
Dripping, from the Art Brothel series, 1995. Gelatin silver print on aluminium. 95x180 cm. Private collection, Chicago.

=== No Light (1995–present) ===
No Light is the title of a video artwork which Corte began working on with Nurcis in 1995. Corte and Nurcis play the two main characters in the video, which has a narrative structure and includes digital animation, pictorial scenography, costumes, text, and music, all created by the two artists. The video, completed in 1997, is 30 minutes long. In the intervening decades, the two artists have periodically re-elaborated themes and images from No Light to celebrate their ongoing artistic collaboration. Similar to their previous collaboration – the Botanical Rarities installation of 1981 – new works offer new interpretations and perspectives on a project that has evolved from a medium-length video to include video still prints, sculptures, drawings, vinyl records, audio CDs, limited edition of artistic gadgets, and multimedia installations. The meaning behind the No Light project, with all its subsequent re-elaborations, can be synthesized as a satirical representation of how the Tragic is impossible within the system of contemporary art. It's a parody of the “pain” and torment of creating, or as a schizophrenic “split” of the artist’s personality into two different characters who hold a conflictual dialogue about the possibility of abandoning the artistic career. No Light was presented to an international audience in 1999 at the Italian pavilion of the 48th Venice Biennale, directed by Harald Szeemann.

=== Maskon, Anthrocon and Intericon series (1996–present) ===
Maskon, Anthrocon and Intericon are three series of works on paper and cardboard, thematically linked by common elements, including the theme of humans dressing up for erotic reasons. Maskon was the name given in Japan in the early ‘90s to the phenomenon of “rubber dolls”, or the erotic practice of playing the role of dolls while wearing latex clothes and masks. The practice had elements of sadomasochism, but filtered by references to the world of manga (not to be confused with the Cosplay phenomenon). Anthrocon, a blend of the words “anthropomorph” and “convention”, is a series of conventions that have taken place, from the Nineties onwards, primarily in the United States and, to a lesser extent, other parts of the world. These conventions bring together enthusiasts who dress up as anthropomorphic furry animals, using flashy costumes, handmade or bought from specialized fabricators. The latent eroticism in this inclination is often highlighted in Corte’s works. Intericon is a phenomenon which, while inspired by Maskon and Anthrocon, is the creation of Corte. The works of the Intericon series – portmanteau of the words “interiors” and “convention” – show groups of people with a shared passion for dressing up as objects and interior furnishings, satisfying their erotic penchants in complete immobility and semidarkness within apartments designated for the purpose.

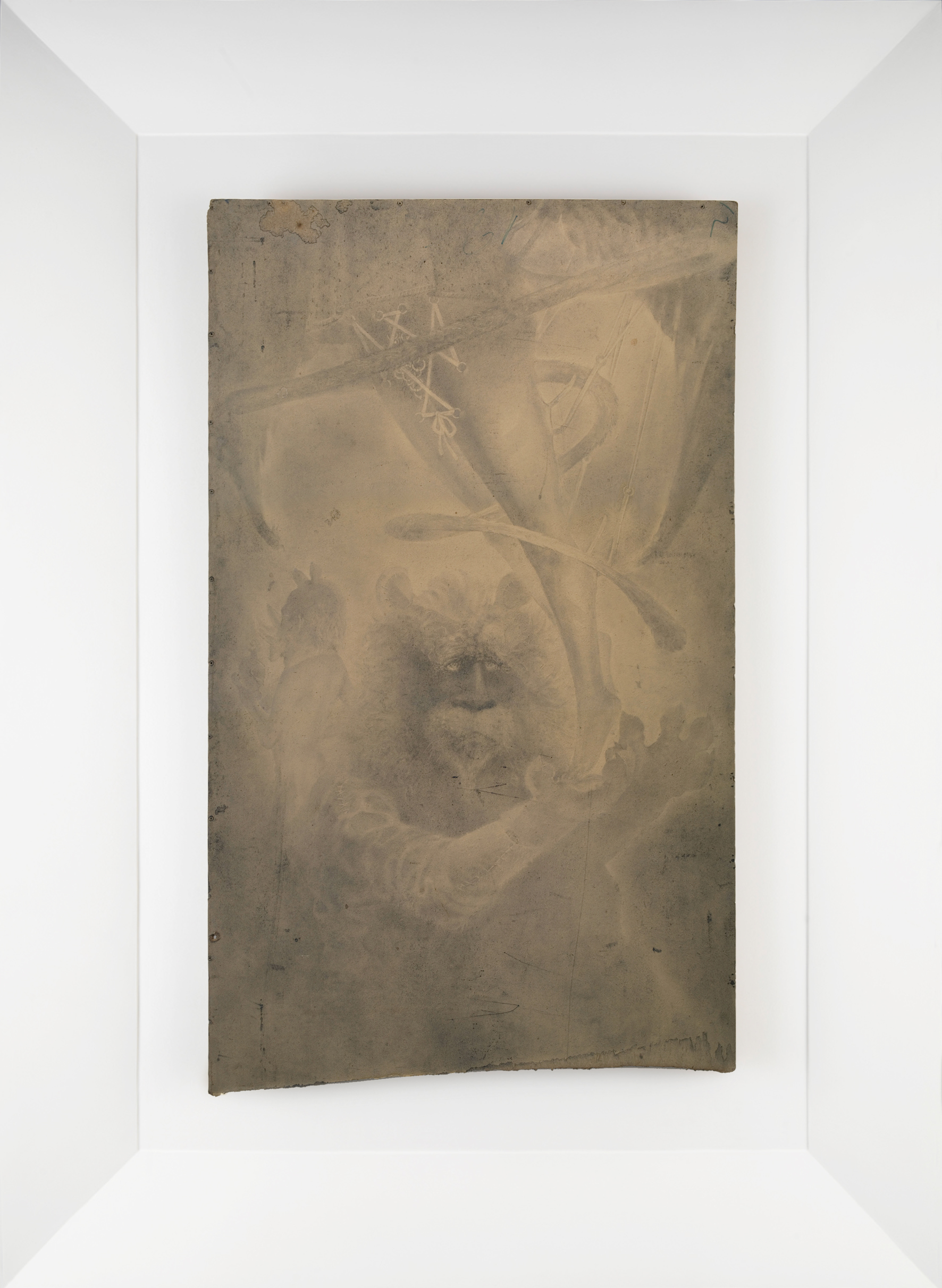
Anthrocon Chimera, 2007. Dirt and soot partially erased by the artist on a fragment of panel used by a homeless person to build a temporary lodging. 230x172x11,5 cm. Collection: Bank of Sardinia.

=== Luciferin music (1995–present) ===
Luciferin music is the title Corte gives to his musical production from 1995 to date, «to say goodnight to the art world» – as is written on his personal Bandcamp page. The term "luciferin" refers here to heterocyclic compounds present in some living organisms which produce bioluminescence, like fireflies. Corte plays on the reference to Lucifer, the name given to Satan in the Judeo-Christian tradition (in the No Light video, for which Corte composed the music, he plays a little demon). For his musical projects, Corte presents himself as various “entities” or alter egos – musical groups or soloists – preferring to appear with his own name only as a “producer”. While Corte is responsible for the entirety of his musical compositions, during the creative phase, he often relies on sound engineers and other musicians: like much of his work, the artist's approach to music is collaborative. La Partouze and Un Autre are some of the aliases Corte adopts in his musical projects.

== Publications ==
In 2008, the monograph Enrico Corte - Spectrospective was published by Damiani, with a critical essay by art critic Gianluca Marziani. The volume, distributed internationally, can be found in the libraries of institutions such as Tate Gallery, Stanford University,Columbia University and the Pratt Institute in New York.
