= Andrea Nurcis =

Italian contemporary artist (born 1962)

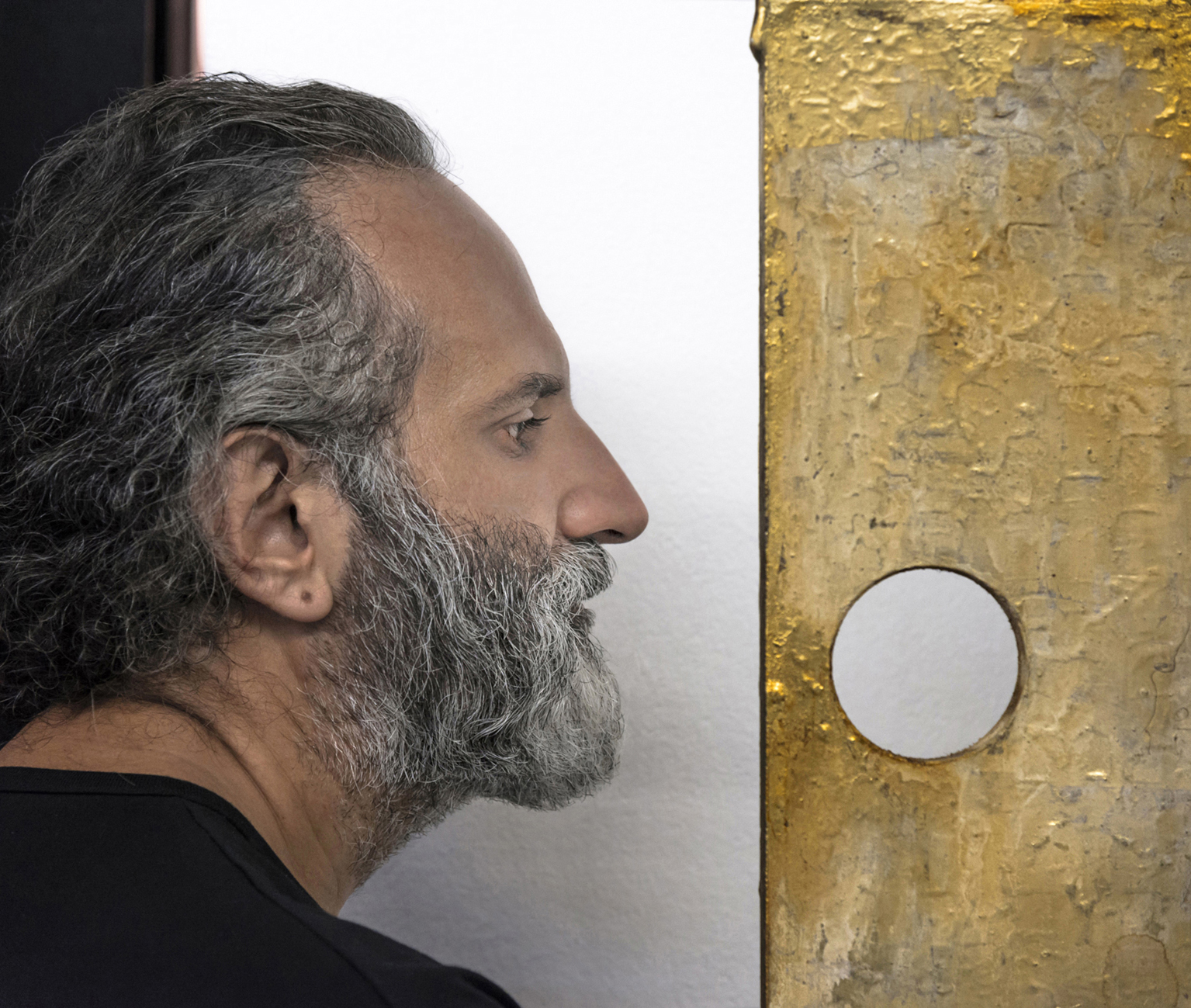
- Andrea Nurcis in 2015. Photo by Francesca Manca di Villahermosa.
- Born: February 26, 1962 (age 64); Cagliari, Italy
- Education: University of Cagliari
- Known for: Drawing, painting, sculpture, video art
- Website: andreanurcis.net

Andrea Nurcis is an Italian contemporary artist known for his work in the fields of drawing, painting, sculpture and video art.

== Biography ==
Andrea Nurcis (born Andrea Curreli, February 26, 1962) was born in Cagliari, Italy. Since 1980 he has exhibited in private galleries in Italy and the United States, and in museums and public spaces including the Palazzo delle Esposizioni in Rome, the Royal Palace of Naples, the Italian Pavilion at the 48th Venice Biennale, the Galleria d'Arte Moderna, Bologna, the Arnaldo Pomodoro Foundation in Milan, the Palazzo Collicola Arti Visive museum in Spoleto. Since 1986 he has lived and worked much of the time in Rome; his works are to be found in private and public collections in Italy, United Kingdom, France, Germany, Spain and the United States. He has held public lectures at universities, artistic foundations and museums, including the Galleria Nazionale d’Arte Moderna in Rome. His approach to art often includes collaboration with other artists or cultural operators, including the artist Enrico Corte with whom he has established a privileged relationship over time.

In 1999 the Swiss critic Harald Szeemann, director of the 48th Venice Biennale, invited the collective Oreste to exhibit inside the Italian Pavilion; the artist, as a member of the group, co-organized an ongoing artistic project about networking whose results were illustrated in the book Oreste at the Venice Biennale, published by Charta and distributed internationally. In 2003 Nurcis began working with the Buia Gallery in New York, taking part in the Young Italian Genome group show – the exhibition that inaugurated the gallery's activity. In 2005 the sculptor Arnaldo Pomodoro invited Nurcis to take part to La scultura italiana del XX secolo, a group show that inaugurated the Arnaldo Pomodoro Foundation in Milan, focused on the works of the most important Italian sculptors of the century, such as Adolfo Wildt, Giacomo Balla, Marino Marini, Mario Merz, Luciano Fabro, Enzo Cucchi and others. In 2017 the museum director Gianluca Marziani organized a retrospective of Nurcis' works, from 1981 to present days, at the Palazzo Collicola Arti Visive museum in Spoleto, Umbria, occupying three floors of the museum.

Recurring features of the work of Nurcis are the post-conceptual attitude towards art and the manic nature of his craftsmanship. Nurcis considers the classical conceptual approach developed by contemporary artists during the 20th century to be obsolete, and prefers to talk about his working method as being similar to that of a poet: just as the poet aligns words disconnected from discursive syntax and even from grammatical logic, the artist works by accumulation of formal and plastic elements, often juxtaposed according to the artist’s casual logic or pure unconscious improvisation. His manic execution often manifests itself in the obsessive execution of pen drawings in various formats, or in the tiny details with which he covers his sculptures, even those of monumental dimensions.

== Works ==
=== The Black Drawings series (1981–present) ===
The Untitled series of drawings, also called the Black Drawings series, is based on a continual production process of drawings made in ballpoint pen on small sheets of paper (each about 19x14 cm) that the artist has undertaken to draw, starting in 1981, for the rest of his life. The project foresaw that Nurcis create a drawing every night, struggling against sleep and concentrating on work with such tension as to almost destroy the sheet of paper on which the drawing was executed; within the limits of the possible imposed by the course of events, Nurcis has tried to remain faithful to his original purpose. Over time, the usual ballpoint pen ink technique on paper has been enriched with tempera, acrylic, gold or silver leaf inserts. The Black Drawings series today consists of several thousand works – all owned by the artist – which he exhibits in blocks but has never proposed to the public in its entirety. Nurcis has also prepared a contract that would commit a collector to buying the Black Drawings all together, including those still to be realised.

=== No Light (1995–present) ===
No Light is a work of digital video art created in collaboration with the artist Enrico Corte. It is a 30-minute narrative video representing a dialogue in alternating scenes between two characters: a small Demon, interpreted by Corte with the use of digital animation techniques, and a Hermit, played by Nurcis. Nurcis created his Hermit costume by hand and sometimes exhibits it as a sculptural work. No Light includes scenography and props made by Nurcis and Corte; the artists have exhibited these works separately from the video. A series of stills taken from the video was selected by Corte and Nurcis and exhibited in the form of photographic prints of varying sizes, even composing them as large-format environmental installations. The continual reworking of images, plastic objects, costumes and scenery – in addition to a series of limited-edition gadgets inspired by the video – over the years to date has allowed the artists to broaden their initial inspiration and provide new keys to the reading of No Light, inserting the video in a context of a multimedia nature.

=== Homevideo (1997) ===
Homevideo is a digital video art work created in collaboration with Enrico Corte. For this project Nurcis and Corte invited a series of friends, residing in the Roman area, to visit in turn the artists’ house-studio, located on the outskirts of Rome. Each guest had to choose a room of the house-studio to “stage” an existential narration based on improvisation; Nurcis and Corte, without interacting with the guest, filmed the action with a 35mm camera. The project also stipulated that when all the rooms of the house-studio had been occupied by the various guests over time, and all the filming had been completed, Nurcis and Corte would sell the house and move elsewhere. Although there are several hours of film, the artists have so far screened only a partial editing of 33 minutes of the video, that includes music written for the occasion, arthouse film sequences, and television broadcasts clips that complete their narrative project; in this form, Homevideo was presented at Corto Circuito film festival at the Royal Palace of Naples, directed by Franz Cerami in 1998 and in the Italian Pavilion of the 48th Venice Biennale, directed by Harald Szeemann in 1999.

=== Pino Piercing Wears a Sculpture (1997) ===
In February 1997 Andrea Nurcis, together with the artist Enrico Corte, was invited by the art dealer Anna D’Ascanio to present their double solo exhibition in her gallery in Rome. Each of the two artists proposed a series of works on paper to be exhibited on two adjacent walls, while in the center of the gallery they placed a metal sculpture made by the two of them in 1996. The sculpture was designed by Corte and Nurcis to be “worn” by a friend of theirs known under the pseudonym of Pino Piercing, one of the first professional piercers in the Roman area of the ‘90s, who worked mainly in the alternative social centers. In practice, each pointed protuberance from the central body of the sculpture was designed to penetrate the various parts of Pino’s body where he already had piercings. On the evening of the inauguration, the two artists filmed a 20-minute video entitled Pino Piercing Wears a Sculpture by Enrico Corte and Andrea Nurcis, which today also appears as a sort of document of the artistic scene of the Capital, as in the audience there are various representatives of the world of art, literature, cinema, music and even high-level prostitution from the early ‘90s. Nurcis and Corte, with that particular event – which combined design, sculpture and post-human performance art – intended to renew the traditional, official environment of the art galleries of Rome, of which the D’Ascanio gallery was one of the representatives, bringing to the inauguration the “countercultural” world of the alternative social centers, from which many of the visitors to the exhibition came to celebrate their friend Pino.

=== Koprospheros (2005) ===
Koprospheros is the title of a 3 meter high sculpture made by Nurcis in fiberglass, polyester and synthetic plaster. It exemplifies the artist’s interest in the human figure in its physical imperfections and genetic deformations, as well as his humanistic syncretism through the contamination between various mythological (the classical myth of Atlas), naturalistic (the reference to the dung beetle and its ball of excrement – and its capacity to orient itself using the Milky Way's band of light) and philosophical themes (the texts of the contemporary German philosopher Peter Sloterdijk, in particular the so-called Sphären trilogy made up of Blasen, 1998, Globen, 1999, and Schäume, 2004). The work was selected by the sculptor Arnaldo Pomodoro and by the critic Marco Meneguzzo for the Italian Sculpture of the Twentieth Century exhibition at the Arnaldo Pomodoro Foundation in Milan in 2005. The show was intended as a historical survey of the most important sculptors of the 20th century at a national level and included works by Medardo Rosso, Umberto Boccioni, Lucio Fontana, Alberto Burri, Pino Pascali, Jannis Kounellis, Gilberto Zorio, Giuseppe Penone, Michelangelo Pistoletto, Mimmo Paladino, Maurizio Cattelan, and others.

=== Ghost Painting (2017) ===
Ghost Painting is a painting of 250x300x10 cm created by Nurcis in tempera and oil on wood with three-dimensional inserts in polyester resin. In this work the relationship between painting and sculpture, which the artist often fuses in the same creation, appears clearly. The classical quadrangular shape of the “painting” is itself violated by the irregularity of the contours of the work. Ghost Painting is based on the concept of “stratification”, that is, of indefinite accumulation of pictorial levels: each successive layer deletes partly the previous one except for some details that continue to emerge according to the artist’s calculation that also includes a certain quotient of randomness. The work was selected by the critic and museum director Gianluca Marziani to be included in the double retrospective of Nurcis and Corte, entitled ExcerptⒶ, at the Palazzo Collicola Arti Visive museum in Spoleto between December 2017 and March 2018.
