= Cortes de Aragón =

Cortes de Aragón may refer to:

- Aragonese Corts, the historical and present legislature of Aragon
- Cortes de Aragón, municipality in the province of Teruel, Aragon, Spain
