= Cortes =

Cortes, Cortés, Cortês, Corts, or Cortès may refer to:

== People ==
- Cortes (surname), including a list of people with the name
  - Hernán Cortés (1485–1547), a Spanish conquistador

== Places ==
- Cortes, Navarre, a village in the South border of Navarre, Spain
- Cortes de Aragón, Teruel, a municipality in the province of Teruel, Aragón, Spain
- Cortes, Bohol, a municipality in the Philippines
- Cortes, Surigao del Sur, a municipality in the Philippines
- Cortês, a municipality in Pernambuco, Brazil
- Puerto Cortés, a seaport in Honduras
- Cortés Department, a department in Honduras
- Cortes Island, an island in British Columbia, Canada
- Cortes, Aberdeenshire, a village in Scotland, United Kingdom

== Institutions ==
- Cortes of Cádiz, former parliament of Spain
- Cortes Generales, the parliament of Spain
- Aragonese Corts, the regional parliament for the Spanish autonomous community of Aragon
- Cortes of Castile-La Mancha, the legislature of the Autonomous Community of Castile–La Mancha, Spain
- Cortes of Castile and León, the legislature of the Autonomous Community of Castile and León, Spain
- Cortes of León, a parliamentary body in the medieval Kingdom of León
- General Court of Catalonia, historical parliamentary body of the Principality of Catalonia
- Corts Valencianes, the legislature of the Valencian Community
- Portuguese Cortes, any of historical consultative assemblies called by kings of Portugal
- Cortes Gerais, the legislature of the Kingdom of Portugal during the 19th and 20th centuries

== Other ==
- Cortes (miniseries), an American television miniseries

== See also ==
- Corte (disambiguation)
- Cortez (disambiguation)
- Les Corts (disambiguation)
