= Autophile =

Autophile may also refer to:

- Self-love
- Automotive enthusiast
