= Cortez =

Cortez may refer to:

== Places ==
=== United States ===
- Cortez, California, an unincorporated community in Merced County
- Cortez, Colorado, a city and county seat of Montezuma County
- Cortez, Florida, a census-designated place
- Cortez, Nevada, ghost town
- Cortez, Pennsylvania, an unincorporated community

=== Elsewhere ===
- Sea of Cortez or Gulf of California, in Mexico

== Other uses ==
- Cortez, an 1823 play by James Planché
- Cortez Motor Home, a Class-A motor coach made in the U.S. from 1963 to 1979
- Agnelli & Nelson or Cortez, trance music duo
- Cortez, a character from The Longest Journey and Dreamfall
- Cortez the Killer, a song by Neil Young
- Nike Cortez, a type of running shoe from Nike
- Wuling Cortez, a rebadged Baojun 730 minivan marketed by Wuling Motors for the Indonesian market
- Wuling Starlight 730, a minivan sold in the Indonesian market as the Wuling Cortez Darion

== People ==
=== Surname ===
- Adrian T. Cortez (1978–2016), American trans woman and performer with the stage name Brittany CoxXx
- Alberto Cortez (1940–2019), Argentine singer and songwriter
- Alexandria Ocasio-Cortez (born 1989), American politician and educator
- Amado Cortez (1928–2003), Filipino actor and diplomat
- Antawn Cortez Jamison (born 1976), American basketball player
- Bella Cortez (born 1944), Cuban actress and dancer
- Carlos Cortez (1923–2005), American poet, artist and political activist
- Chris Cortez (born 1988), American soccer player
- Dave "Baby" Cortez (born 1938), American pop music and R&B musician
- Edgar Cortez (born 1989), Nicaraguan runner
- Elaine Sena Cortez, American politician and educator
- Emilia Cortez, American politician
- Erwin Cortez, born name is Erwin Sutodihardjo (born 1983), Indonesian actor and model
- Fernando Cortez (born 1981), American baseball player
- Gregorio Cortez (1875–1916), Mexican folk hero
- Hernán Cortés (1485–1547), the Spanish Conquistador who led an expedition that caused the fall of the Aztec Empire
- Heidi Cortez (born 1981), American actress, model and writer
- Jayne Cortez (1934–2012), American poet
- Jenny Cortez, born name is Nurjaenih (born 1986), Indonesian actress, model and disc jockey
- Jhay Cortez (born 1993), Puerto Rican singer and rapper
- Joana Cortez (born 1979), Brazilian tennis player
- Jody Cortez (born c. 1960), American drummer
- Joe Cortez (born 1945), Puerto Rican boxing referee
- Jorge Cortez (born 1972), Panamanian baseball player
- José Cortez (born 1975), American football player
- José Luis Cortez (born 1979), Ecuadorian footballer
- Lucía Cortez Llorca (born 2000), Spanish tennis player
- Luís Cortez (born 1994), Portuguese footballer
- Manuel Cortez, alternate ring name of Frank Scarpa (1915–1969), American professional wrestler
- Manuel Cortez (born 1979), German–Portuguese actor
- Mike Cortez (born 1980), American basketball player
- Odette Cortez (born 1987), Panamanian choreographer, dancer and folklorist
- Page Cortez (born 1961), American politician
- Paul E. Cortez, American soldier and war criminal
- Philip Cortez (born 1978), American politician
- Rafael Cortez (born 1976), Brazilian journalist, actor and comedian
- Raul Cortez (1932–2006), Brazilian actor
- Ricardo Cortez (1899–1977), American silent film actor
- Stanley Cortez (1908–1997), American cinematographer
- Viorica Cortez (born 1935), Romanian-born French mezzo-soprano

=== Given name ===
- Cortez Allen (born 1988), American former football cornerback
- Cortez Belle (born 1983), English former footballer
- Cortez Braham (born 2000), American football player
- Cortez Broughton (born 1996), American football player
- Cortez Castro, alternate ring name of Ricky Reyes (born 1978), Cuban-American retired professional wrestler
- Cortez Gray (1916–1996), American basketball player
- Cortez Groves (born 1978), American former professional basketball player
- Cortez Hankton (born 1981), American college football coach and former player
- Cortez Jordan (1921–1982), Barbadian Test cricket umpire between 1953 and 1974
- Cortez Kennedy (1968–2017), American football player
- Cortez Ratima (born 2001), New Zealand professional rugby union player
- Cortez Shaw, American contestant on American Idol season 12
- Cortez Stubbs (born 1988), American football player
- Cortez Te Pou (born 2001), New Zealand rugby league footballer
- Cortez Thaddeus Ham Jr., birth name of C. J. Ham (born 1993), American NFL player

=== Fictional ===
- Fabian Cortez, a Marvel Comics supervillain
- Anne-Marie Cortez, a Marvel Comics supervillain
- Sergeant Cortez, protagonist of the TimeSplitters video game series
- Ian Cortez, a Cuban intelligence agent working for the Colombian Cartel in the novel/film Clear and Present Danger
- Henry Cortez, a character in the Millennium series of novels by Stieg Larsson
- Hotel Cortez, the setting of American Horror Story: Hotel
- Juni and Carmen Cortez, main protagonists in the Spy Kids franchise
- Olivia Cortez, a character from the American thriller television series Mr. Robot
- Cortez, a character in Paper Mario: The Thousand-Year Door

== See also ==
- Cortes (disambiguation)
- Cortes (surname)
