= Cortes of León of 1188 =

Political assembly in the medieval kingdom of León, Spain

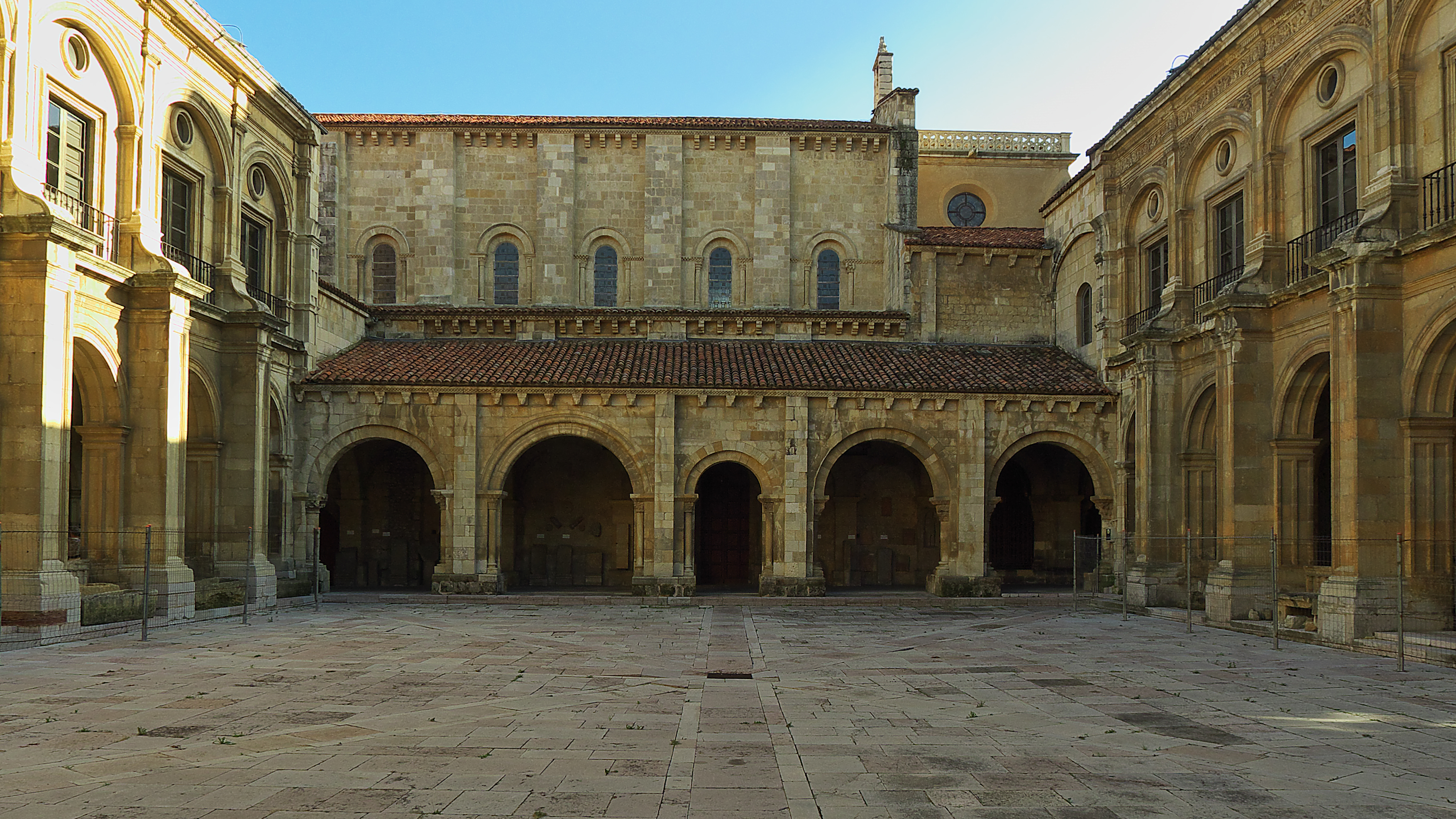
The cloister of San Isidoro in 2014.

The Cortes of León or Decreta of León from year 1188 was a parliamentary body in the medieval Kingdom of León. According to UNESCO, it is the first historically documented example of a parliamentary system.

After coming to power, King Alfonso IX, facing an attack by his neighbours, Castile and Portugal, decided to summon the curia regis or king's court/royal council to the Basilica of San Isidoro, León. This was a gathering of the nobility and the higher clergy called to advise the king, used in numerous countries during the Middle Ages. Because of the seriousness of the situation, Alfonso IX also called in representatives of the wealthy merchants and tradesmen from the most important cities of the kingdom, thus uniting the three Estates of the Realm in one council.

All these meetings were exceptional and did not lead to a regular attendance of commoners (the Third Estate) in the council. León's Cortes dealt with matters like the right to private property, the inviolability of domicile, the right to appeal to justice opposite the King and the obligation of the King to consult the Cortes before entering a war.

== See also ==
- Cortes - the name of various parliamentary bodies in Spain and Portugal from the Middle Ages to today

== Sources ==
- Encyclopædia Britannica, 1911: "History of Europe" (Birth of parliamentary bodies)
- O'Callaghan, Joseph F. "The beginnings of the Cortes of León-Castile», American History Review 1969, p. 1504.
- O'Callaghan, Joseph F. "A History of Medieval Spain". Ithaca 1975.
- Procter, Evelyn. "Curia and Cortes in León and Castile 1072-1295". Cambridge 1980.
- Procter, Evelyn."The Interpretation of Clause 3 in the Decrees of León," EHR 85 (1970
- Merriman, Roger B. "The Cortes of the Spanish Kingdoms in the Later Middle Ages," AHR 16 (1911)
- Keane, John. "The Life and Death of Democracy". Simon & Schuster, London, 2009.
- Spanish version of the Decreta of León of 1188. Translation to Spanish by José María Fernández Catón from the original text in Latin, as it was transcribed in the three 16th-century codices compared, namely: Biblioteca Nacional de España, Manuscript 12909, folios 307v-310v; Manuscript 772, folios 305r-308r; Biblioteca Capitular de Sevilla, Signature 56-2-20, folios 189v-192r.
