= Amour de soi =

Concept in Rousseau's philosophy

Amour de soi (French: [a.muʁ də swa]; lit. 'self-love') is a concept in the philosophy of Jean-Jacques Rousseau that refers to the kind of self-love that humans share with brute animals and predates the appearance of society.

== Concept ==
Rousseau maintained in Emile that amour de soi is the source of human passion as well as the origin and the principle of all the other desires. It is associated with the notion of "self-preservation" as a natural sentiment that drives every animal to watch over its own survival. The philosopher stated that this type of love is prominent at the stage where our faculties are not developed, hence considered still one of a brute. This concept forms part of Rousseau's argument that the gulf between humans and the rest of animal creation does not exist.

Acts committed out of amour de soi tend to be for individual well-being. It is considered "always good and always in conformity with order", for it is not malicious, because amour de soi self-love does not involve pursuing one's self-interest at the expense of others. One is justified in ignoring the well-being of others, if his well-being is materially threatened.

The sentiment does not compare oneself with others but is concerned solely with regarding oneself as an absolute and valuable existence. It is related to an awareness of one's future and can restrain the present impulse. Rousseau contrasts it with amour-propre, that kind of self-love found in Thomas Hobbes' philosophy, in which one's opinion of oneself is dependent on what other people think and which arises only with society.

Rousseau suggested that amour de soi was lost during the transition from the pre-societal condition to society, but it can be restored by the use of "good" institutions created with the social contract. This renewed passage from the state of nature to the civilized state would bring man to favor justice instead of instinct.

== See also ==
- Amour-propre
