= Les Corts =

Les Corts may refer to:

- Camp de Les Corts, the former home ground of FC Barcelona
- Les Corts (district), a district of Barcelona
- Les Corts (neighbourhood), one of the 3 neighborhoods within the district of Les Corts, in Barcelona
- Les Corts (Barcelona Metro), a station of the Barcelona metro in Les Corts district

== See also ==
- Corts (disambiguation)
