= Cortez, Pennsylvania =

Unincorporated community in Pennsylvania, U.S.

Coordinates: 41.0184°N 78.9832°W

Cortez is an unincorporated community in Jefferson County, in the U.S. state of Pennsylvania.

== History ==
A post office was established at Cortez in 1895, and remained in operation until it was discontinued in 1904.
