= Corto =

Corto may refer to:

- another word for ristretto, a very "short" shot of espresso coffee
- Jon Corto (born 1984), National Football League player with the Buffalo Bills
- Corto Maltese, the British hero of the Italian comic series of the same name
- Willis Corto, a major character in the science fiction novel Neuromancer
- Corto.io, an open-source component framework for autonomous IoT applications
- the Spanish translation meaning short, curt, brief, narrow, skimpy, scanty, timid, stumpy, or bashful.
