= Orto Botanico dell'Università di Cagliari =

Botanical garden in Italy

Coordinates: 39.222°N 9.111°E

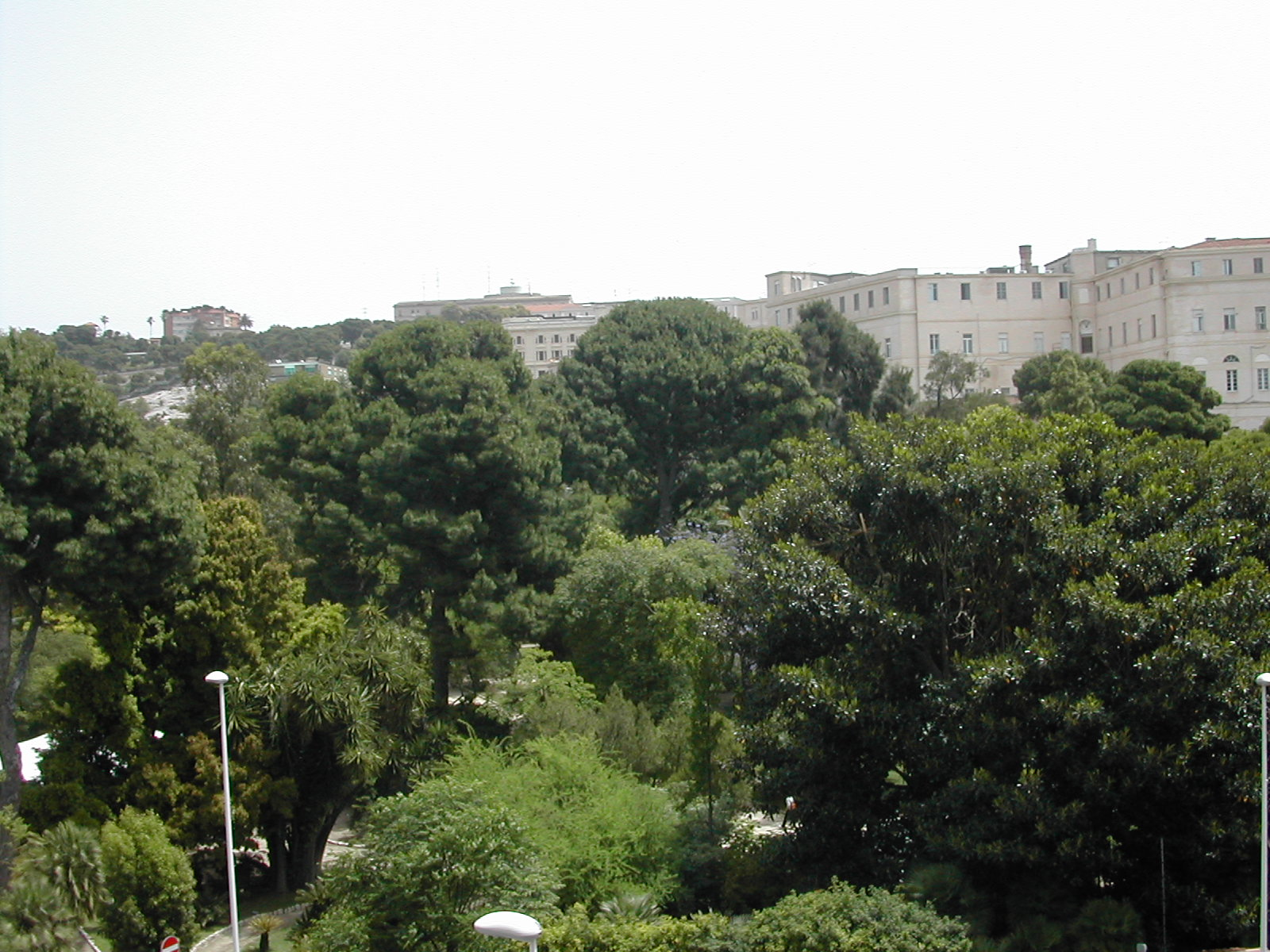
View

The Orto Botanico dell'Università di Cagliari (5 hectares), also known as the Orto Botanico di Cagliari, is a botanical garden operated by the University of Cagliari and located at Viale S. Ignazio da Laconi 9–11, Cagliari, Sardinia, Italy.

The first attempt to establish a botanical garden in Cagliari dates back to the planting carried out between 1752 and 1769 in a district to the east of the Sardinian capital, Su Campu de Su Re (Sardinian-language term for “King's field”) in what is now the Villanova district, in a place that had subsequently long retained the name of Sa Butanica (the botany).

The garden was inaugurated in 1866 under the direction of Prof. Patrizio Gennari. Its first seed index was published in 1885, and by 1901 the garden contained some 430 species (of which 36 were killed by that year's deep frost). The garden was damaged in World War II but has subsequently been restored.

Today the garden contains some 2000 species, predominantly of Mediterranean origin but with a good collection of succulents and tropical plants as well. The garden is organized into three major sections:

- Mediterranean plants – representing the three bands of Sardinian vegetation as well as species from Australia, California, Chile, etc.
- Succulent plants – about 1000 succulents from Echinocereus, Euphorbia, Lampranthus, Mammillaria, Opuntia, etc., in a greenhouse and outdoors, roughly equally divided between African and American origin.
- Tropical plants.

All told, the garden contains some 600 trees and 550 shrubs. Of particular interest is its palm collection (4000 m^{2}), with 60 specimens representing 16 species, and a magnificent specimen of Euphorbia canariensis spreading across 100 m^{2}. The site also contains ancient Roman cisterns and natural caves.

== See also ==
- List of botanical gardens in Italy
