= Self-love =

Concept in philosophy and psychology

Self-love, defined as "love of self" or "regard for one's own happiness or advantage", has been conceptualized both as a basic human necessity and as a moral flaw, akin to vanity and selfishness, synonymous with amour-propre, conceitedness, egotism, narcissism, et al. However, throughout the 20th and 21st centuries self-love has adopted a more positive connotation through pride parades, Self-Respect Movement, self-love protests, the hippie era, the modern feminist movement (3rd & 4th wave), as well as the increase in mental health awareness that promotes self-love as intrinsic to self-help and support groups working to prevent substance abuse and suicide.

== Views ==
Verily, a husband is not dear, that one may love the husband; but that one may love oneself, therefore a husband is dear. Verily, a wife is not dear, that one may love the wife; but that one may love oneself, therefore a wife is dear. Verily, sons are not dear, that one may love the sons; but that one may love oneself, therefore sons are dear. Verily, wealth is not dear, that one may love wealth; but that one may love oneself, therefore wealth is dear. Verily, the Brahman-class is not dear, that one may love the Brahman-class; but that one may love oneself, therefore the Brahman-class is dear. Verily, the Kshatra-class is not dear, that one may love the Kshatra-class; but that one may love oneself, therefore the Kshatra-class is dear. Verily, the worlds are not dear, that one may love the worlds; but that one may love oneself, therefore the worlds are dear. Verily, the Gods are not dear, that one may love the Gods; but that one may love oneself, therefore the Gods are dear. Verily, creatures are not dear, that one may love the creatures; but that one may love oneself, therefore are creatures dear. Verily, all is not dear that one may love all; but that one may love oneself, therefore all is dear.

— Brihadaranyaka, 2.4.5

The Hindu arishadvargas (major sins) are short-term self-benefiting pursuits that are ultimately damaging. These include mada (pride). Jainism believes that the four kashaya (passions) stop people escaping the cycle of life and death.

Gautama Buddha (c. 563-483 BC) and Buddhism believe that the desires of the self are the root of all evil. However, this is balanced with karuṇā (compassion).

Confucius (551–479 BC) and Confucianism values society over the self.

Yang Zhu (440–360 BC) and Yangism viewed wei wo, or "everything for myself", as the only virtue necessary for self-cultivation. All of what is known of Yangism comes from its contemporary critics - Yang's beliefs were hotly contested.

The thoughts of Aristotle (384–322 BC) about self-love (philautia) are recorded in the Nicomachean Ethics and Eudemian Ethics. Nicomachean Ethics Book 9, Chapter 8 focuses on it particularly. In this passage, Aristotle argues that people who love themselves to achieve unwarranted personal gain are bad, but those who love themselves to achieve virtuous principles are the best sort of good. He says the former kind of self-love is much more common than the latter.

Cicero (106–43 BC) considered those who were sui amantes sine rivali (lovers of themselves without rivals) were doomed to end in failure.

Jesus (c. 4 BC-30 AD) prioritised the loving of God, and commanded his followers to love others selflessly, following his example. At the same time, in Mark 12:31 and Matthew 22:39, he taught one to love neighbor as self, implying a love of self. Early follower of Jesus, Paul the Apostle (c. 5–64/65 AD) wrote that inordinate self-love was opposed to love of God in his letter to the Phillipian church. The author of the New Testament letter of James had the same belief.

Christian monk Evagrius Ponticus (345–399) believed excessive self-love (hyperēphania – pride) was one of eight key sins. His list of sins was later lightly adapted by Pope Gregory I as the "seven deadly sins". This list of sins then became an important part of the doctrine of the western church. Under this system, pride is the original and most deadly of the sins. This position was expressed strongly in fiction by Dante's The Divine Comedy.

Augustine (354–430) – with his theology of evil as a mere distortion of the good – considered that the sin of pride was only a perversion of a normal, more modest degree of self-love.

The Sikhs believe that the Five Thieves are the core human weaknesses that steal the innate common sense from people and, according to them, can cause problems.

In 1612 Francis Bacon condemned extreme self-lovers, who would burn down their own home, only to roast themselves an egg.

In the 1660s Baruch Spinoza wrote in his book Ethics that self-preservation was the highest virtue.

Jean-Jacques Rousseau (1712–1778) believed there were two kinds of self-love. One was "amour de soi" (French for "love of self") which is the drive for self-preservation. Rousseau considered this drive to be the root of all human drives. The other was "amour-propre" (often also translated as "self-love", but which also means "pride"), which refers to the self-esteem generated from being appreciated by other people.

The concept of "ethical egoism" was introduced by the philosopher Henry Sidgwick in his book The Methods of Ethics, written in 1874. Sidgwick compared egoism to the philosophy of utilitarianism, writing that whereas utilitarianism sought to maximize overall pleasure, egoism focused only on maximizing individual pleasure.

In 1890, psychologist William James examined the concept of self esteem in his influential textbook Principles of Psychology. Robert H. Wozniak later wrote that William James's theory of self-love in this book was measured in "... three different but interrelated aspects of self: the material self (all those aspects of material existence in which we feel a strong sense of ownership, our bodies, our families, our possessions), the social self (our felt social relations), and the spiritual self (our feelings of our own subjectivity)".

In 1956 psychologist and social philosopher Erich Fromm proposed that loving oneself is different from being arrogant, conceited or egocentric, meaning that instead caring about oneself and taking responsibility for oneself. Fromm proposed a re-evaluation of self-love in more positive sense, arguing that in order to be able to truly love another person, a person first needs to love oneself in the way of respecting oneself and knowing oneself (e.g. being realistic and honest about one's strengths and weaknesses).

In the 1960s, Erik H. Erikson similarly wrote of a post-narcissistic appreciation of the value of the ego, while Carl Rogers saw one result of successful therapy as the regaining of a quiet sense of pleasure in being one's own self.

Self-love or self-worth was defined in 2003 by Aiden Gregg and Constantine Sedikides as "referring to a person's subjective appraisal of himself or herself as intrinsically positive or negative".

== Mental health ==
Lack of self-love increases risk of suicide according to the American Association of Suicidology. The association conducted a study in 2008 which researched the impact of low self-esteem and lack of self-love and its relation to suicidal tendencies and attempts. They defined self-love as being "beliefs about oneself (self-based self-esteem) and beliefs about how other people regard oneself (other-based self-esteem)". It concluded that "depression, hopelessness, and low self-esteem are implications of vulnerability factors for suicide ideation" and that "these findings suggest that even in the context of depression and hopelessness, low self-esteem may add to the risk for suicide ideation".

== Promotion ==
=== History ===
Self-love was first promoted by the Beat Generation of the 1950s and in the early years of the Hippie era of the 1960s. After witnessing the devastating consequences of World War II and having troops still fighting in the Vietnam War, western (especially North American) societies began promoting "peace and love" to help generate positive energy and to promote the preservation of dissipating environmental factors, such as the emergence of oil pipelines and the recognition of pollution caused by the greenhouse effect.

These deteriorating living conditions caused worldwide protests that primarily focused on ending the war, but secondarily promoted a positive environment aided by the fundamental concept of crowd psychology. This post-war community was left very vulnerable to persuasion but began encouraging freedom, harmony, and the possibility of a brighter, non-violent future. These protests took place on almost all continents and included countries such as the United States (primarily New York City and California), England, and Australia. Their dedication, perseverance, and empathy towards human life defined this generation as being peace advocates and carefree souls.

The emergence of the feminist movement began as early as the 19th century, but only began having major influence during the second wave movement, which included women's rights protests that inevitably led to women gaining the right to vote. These protests not only promoted equality but also suggested that women should recognize their self-worth through the knowledge and acceptance of self-love. Elizabeth Cady Stanton used the Declaration of Independence as a guideline to demonstrate that women have been harshly treated throughout the centuries in her feminist essay titled "Declaration of Sentiments". In the essay she claims that "all men and women are created equal; ... that among these [rights] are life, liberty, and the pursuit of happiness"; and that without these rights, the capacity to feel self-worth and self-love is scarce. This historical essay suggests that a lack of self-esteem and fear of self-love affects modern women due to lingering post-industrial gender conditions.

Self-love has also been used as a tool in communities of Color in the United States. In the 1970s Black-Power movement, the slogan "Black is beautiful!" became a way for African-Americans to throw off the mantle of predominately White beauty norms. The dominant cultural aesthetic pre-1970s was to straighten Black hair with a perm or hot comb. During the Black Power movement, the "afro" or "fro" became the popular hairstyle. It involved letting Black Hair grow naturally, without chemical treatment, so as to embrace and flaunt the extremely curly hair texture of Black people. Hair was teased out the hair using a pick. The goal was to cause the hair to form a halo around the head, flaunting the Blackness of its wearer. This form of self-love and empowerment during the 70s was a way for African-Americans to combat the stigma against their natural hair texture, which was, and still is, largely seen as unprofessional in the modern workplace.

=== Modern platforms ===
The emergence of social media has created a platform for self-love promotion and mental health awareness in order to end the stigma surrounding mental health and to address self-love positively rather than negatively.

A few modern examples of self-love promotion platforms include:

- Dove Campaign for Real Beauty (commercial marketing campaign)
- SlutWalk
- To Write Love on Her Arms

== Literary references ==
Beck, Bhar, Brown & Ghahramanlou‐Holloway (2008). "Self-Esteem and Suicide Ideation in Psychiatric Outpatients". Suicide and Life-Threatening Behavior 38.

Malvolio is described as "sick of self-love...a distempered appetite" in Twelfth Night (I.v.85-6), lacking self-perspective.

Self-love or self-worth was later defined by A.P. Gregg and C. Sedikides in 2003.

Origins of Self-love by Willy Zayas in 2019.

== See also ==
- Ego (Freudian)
- Egocentrism
- Eros (concept)
- Hubris
- Individualism
- Joie de vivre
- Me generation
- Self-acceptance
- Self-actualization
- Self-image
- Self-awareness
- Self-compassion
- Self-concept
- Storge (familial love)
- True self and false self
