= Valerio Corte =

Italian Painter and Alchemist

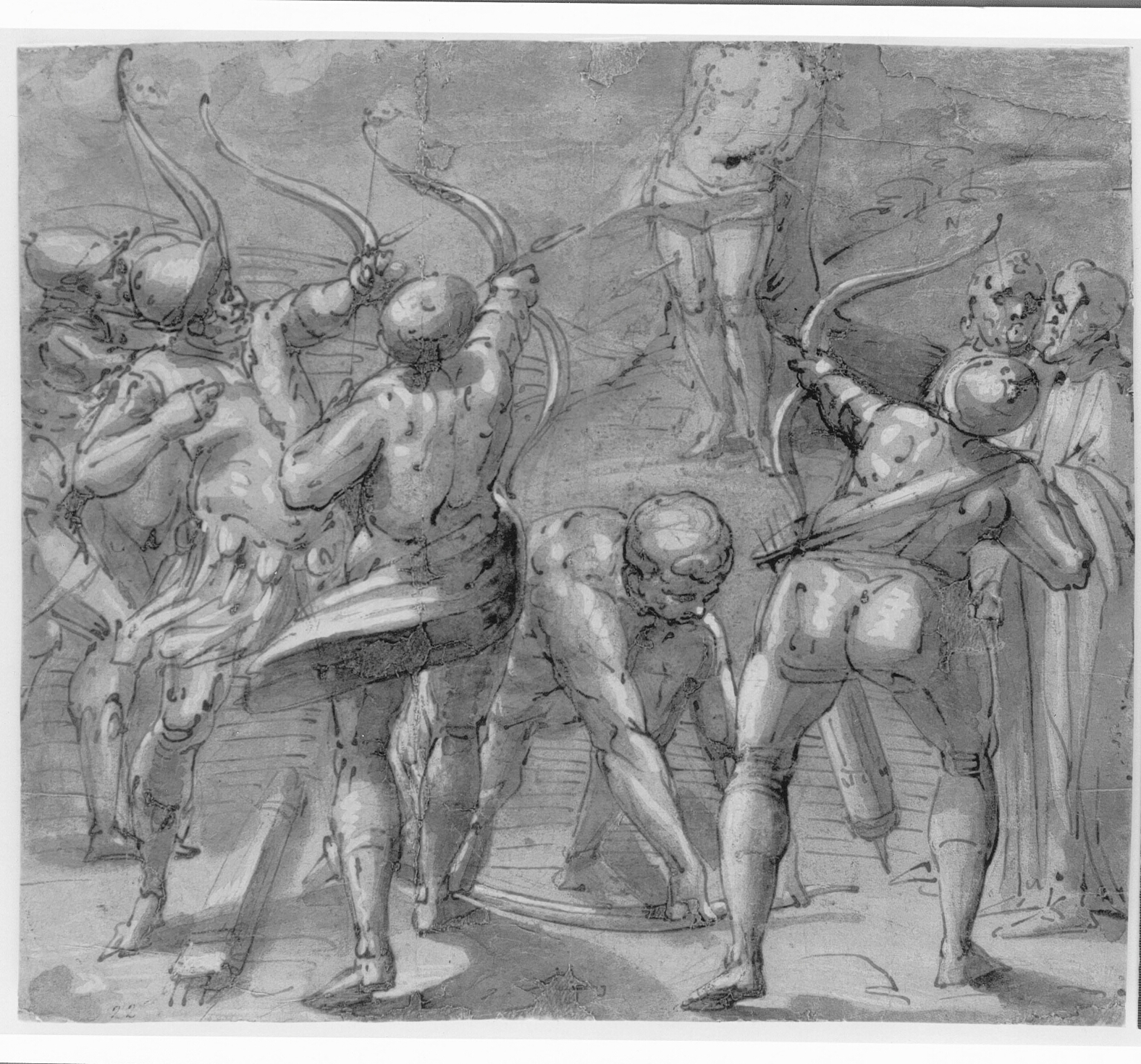

Valerio Corte (Venice, 1530 – Genoa, 1580) was an Italian painter and alchemist of the Renaissance.

He was the father of the painter Cesare Corte, and is known to have been acquainted with Titian. He was a topic of the Rafaello Soprani. He travelled to France as a mercenary. He helped introduce Venetian painting styles, both by works and his work as an art merchant, to Genoa, where he befriended Luca Cambiaso. A few of his works are documented. He is said to have sold all his property to fund his research on alchemy and died a pauper in Genoa.
