= Cesare Corte =

Italian painter

Cesare Corte (1554–1613) was an Italian painter of the Renaissance period, active mainly in his natal city of Genoa.

He was the pupil of his father, the Venetian painter and later alchemist Valerio Corte. He trained under Luca Cambiaso. According to Baldinucci, he was often in demand as a portrait painter. As a young man, he travelled to London and Paris. It is said that Queen Elizabeth of England requested a portrait from him, although he is not mentioned in Lord Orfurd's Anecdotes.

In Genoa, he painted Saints Simon and Francis for Santa Maria del Carmine. He painted San Pietro di Banchi adoring the Virgin (1600) for the church of the same name. For the church of San Pietro, he painted the titular Saint at the feet of the Virgin; for San Francesco, the altar-piece of the chapel of Prince Massa, representing Mary Magdalene; and for the church of Santa Maria del Carmine, two pictures of St. Simeon and St. Francis.

He was known for painting portraits. On 30 December 1612, he was imprisoned by the Roman Inquisition for espousing Lutheran beliefs and possessing Protestant literature. He confessed and underwent a public abjuration of his heretical beliefs on 11 August 1613, in the church of San Domenico. He was condemned to life in prison, although he died within weeks.

Cesare's son, Davidde, was trained as a painter by Domenico Fiasella. Davidde died in 1657 during the plague. Other pupils were Bernardo Strozzi and Luciano Borzone.
