= Corti =

Corti is an Italian surname. Notable people with the surname include:

- Alfonso Giacomo Gaspare Corti (1822–1876), Italian anatomist (see also Organ of Corti)
- Antonio Corti (born 1963), Argentine boxer
- Axel Corti (1933–1993), Austrian writer and film director
- Bonaventura Corti (1729–1813), Italian priest and naturalist
- Claudio Corti (disambiguation), several people
- Eugenio Corti (1921–2014), Italian novelist
- Jean Corti (1929–2015), Italian-French accordionist and composer
- Jesse Corti (born 1955), American voice actor
- Lodovico, Count Corti (1823–1888), Italian diplomat
- Lucille Teasdale-Corti (1929–1996), Canadian physician and international aid worker

== See also ==
- Monchio delle Corti, a municipality in the Province of Parma, Italy
- José Corti, a Paris library and publishing house
- Organ of Corti, an organ in the inner ear of mammals
- Corte (surname)
