= Amour-propre =

Concept in Rousseau's philosophy

Amour-propre (French: [amuʁ pʁɔpʁ]; lit. 'self-love') is a French term that can be variously translated as "self-love", "self-esteem", or "vanity". In philosophy, it is a term used by Jean-Jacques Rousseau, who contrasts it with another kind of self-love, which he calls amour de soi.

== Concept ==
According to Rousseau, the difference between the two is that amour-propre assumes that self-esteem can only be found by gaining the approval of others, whereas amour de soi involves one's feelings for oneself alone, without any intervening concerns about how one is seen by others. According to Rousseau, amour de soi is more primitive and is compatible with wholeness and happiness, while amour-propre is a form of self-love that arose only with the appearance of society and individuals' consequent ability to compare themselves with one another.

Rousseau thought that amour-propre was subject to corruption, thereby causing vice and misery. But in addition, by guiding us to seek others' approval and recognition, amour-propre can contribute positively to virtue.

The term amour-propre predates Rousseau and is found in the writings of Blaise Pascal, La Rochefoucauld, Pierre Nicole, Jacques Abbadie, and many others. Pascal detested self-love, self-esteem, ego, vanity as well perhaps, which are interchangeable terms for him, because it puts the self in the place of God. He suggested it was unfair that we are born with the desire to be loved by others, but unavoidable due to the consequence of the Fall, or original sin. Christianity was the only true remedy to this wretched state of man known as amour-propre.

== See also ==
- Scheler on Ressentiment
