= Cortes de Aragón, Teruel =

Cortes de Aragón, Spain
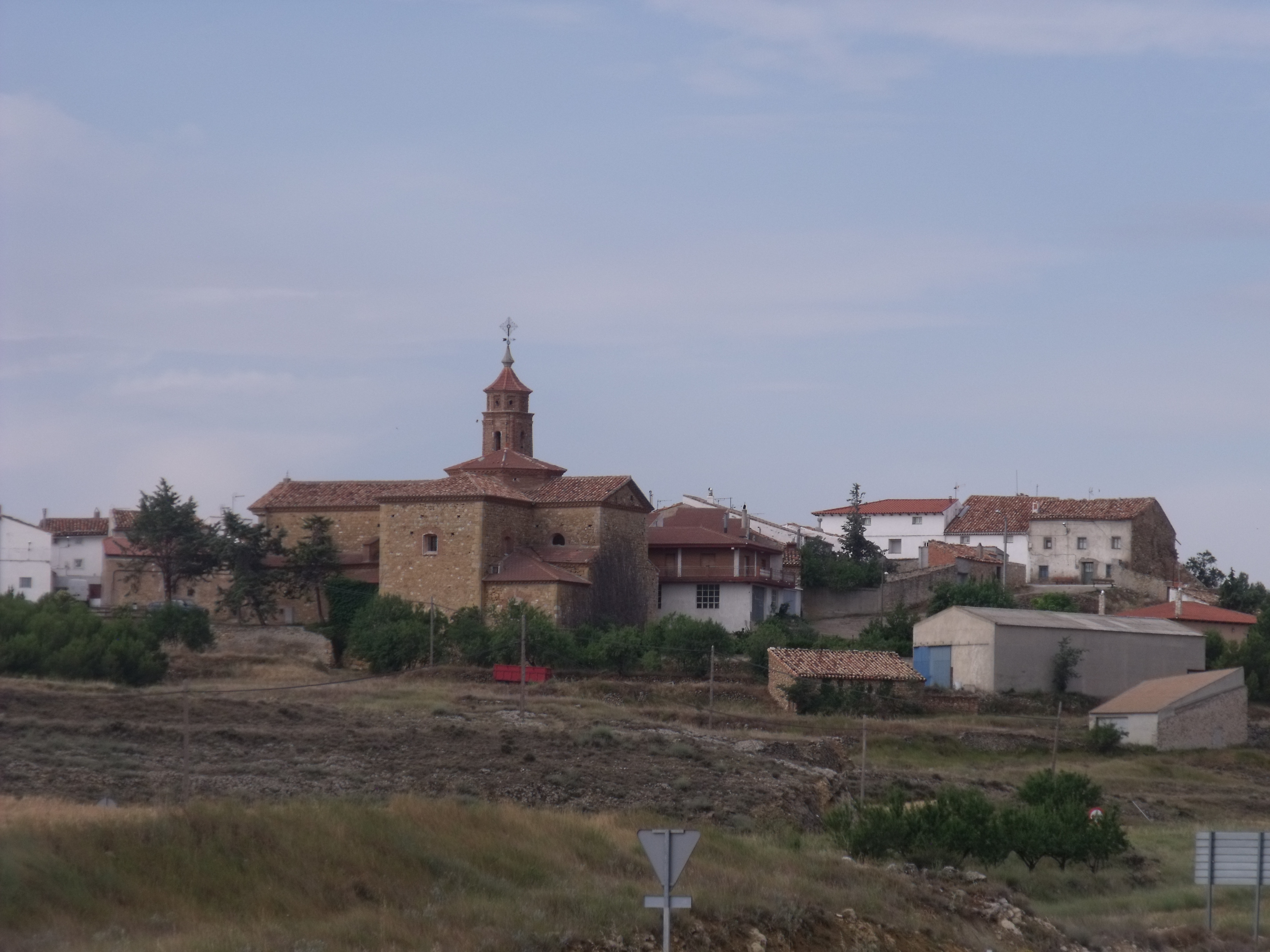

- Flag Coat of arms

- Location within Spain
- Coordinates: 40°58′N 0°50′W
- Country: Spain
- Autonomous community: Aragon
- Province: Teruel
- Municipality: Cortes de Aragón

Area
  - Total: 24.43 km^{2} (9.43 sq mi)
- Elevation: 927 m (3,041 ft)

Population (2025-01-01)
  - Total: 62
  - Density: 2.5/km^{2} (6.6/sq mi)
- Time zone: UTC+1 (CET)
  - Summer (DST): UTC+2 (CEST)

Cortes de Aragón is a municipality located in the province of Teruel, Aragon, Spain. According to the 2004 census (INE), the municipality had a population of 111 inhabitants.

== See also ==
- List of municipalities in Teruel
