= University of Cagliari =

University in Cagliari, Italy

- Università degli Studi di Cagliari
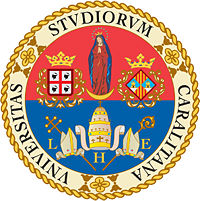
- Coat of arms
- Latin: Universitas Studiorum Caralitana
- Type: State-supported
- Established: 1606; 420 years ago
- Rector: Francesco Mola
- Administrative staff: teaching: 1,200, technical-administrative: 1,300
- Students: 31,102
- Location: Cagliari; Monserrato; Iglesias; Nuoro; Oristano, Italy; 39.217°N 9.115°E
- Campus: * Cagliari (main location): Urban; Monserrato: Suburban; Iglesias, Nuoro and Oristano: Rural
- Sports teams: CUS Cagliari <http://www.cuscagliari.it/>
- Website: www.unica.it

The University of Cagliari (Italian: Università degli Studi di Cagliari) is a public research university in Cagliari, Sardinia, Italy. It was founded in 1606 and is organized in 6 faculties.

== History ==
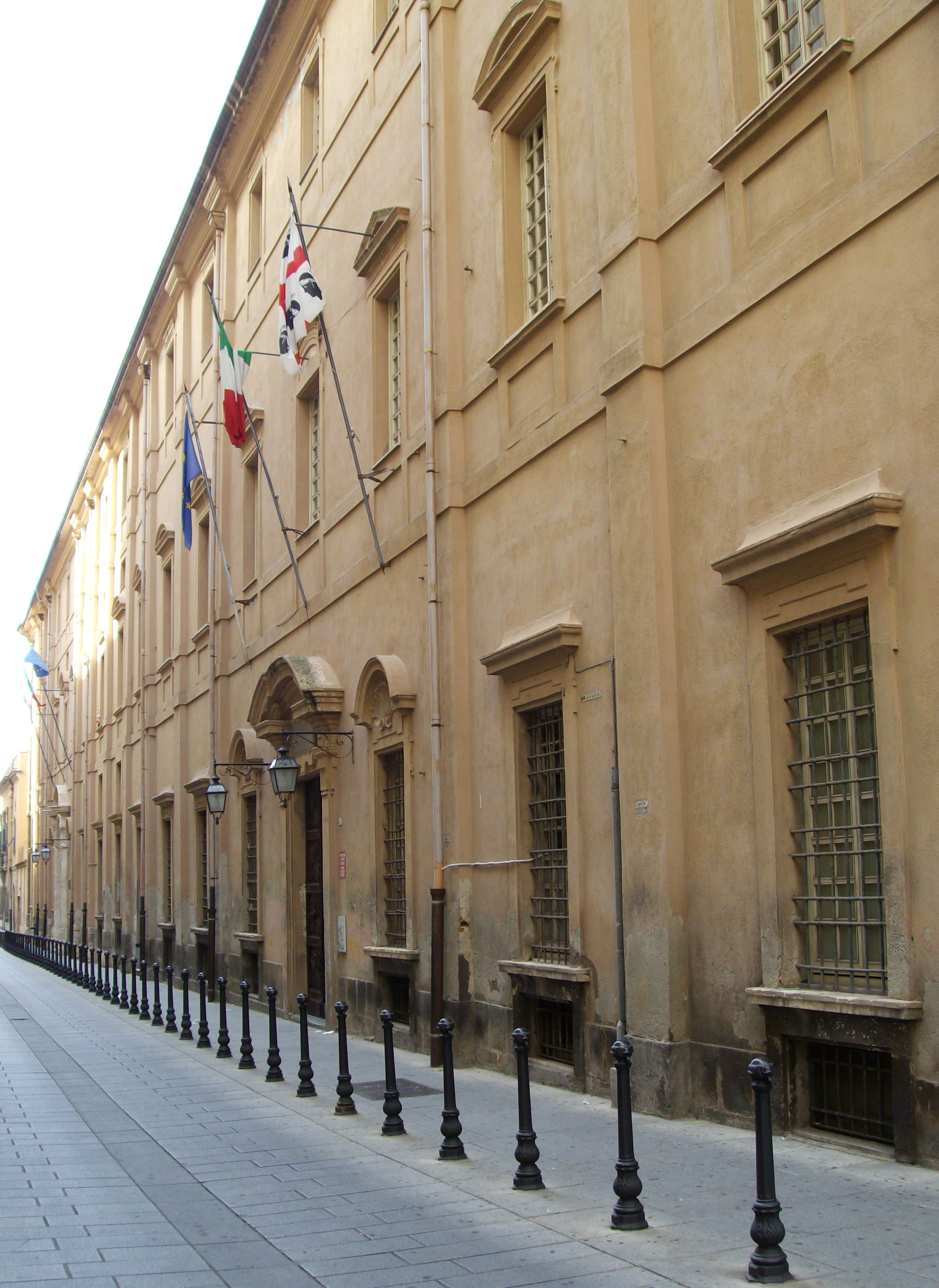
Belgrano Palace or University Palace

The Studium Generalis Kalaritanum was founded in 1606 along the lines of the old Spanish Universities of Salamanca, Valladolid and Lleida, but it begins to operate only after the privilege of King Philip III of Spain in 1620 as Universidad y Estudio General de Caller en el Reyno de Cerdeña (University and General Study of Cagliari in the Kingdom of Sardinia). It originally offered Law, Latin, Greek and Hebrew Literature, the Liberal Arts, Medicine, Surgery, Philosophy and Science. When Sardinia passed under the House of Savoy government in the 18th century, the statute of the university was significantly modified, with the expansion of the science faculties and institutes. Designed by the Piedmontese engineer Saverio Belgrano di Famolasco, the new university building was completed at the end of the 18th century. Today it hosts the Rectorate and the administrative offices. The 19th and 20th centuries saw more and more emphasis placed on research activities, with the achievement of important, internationally acclaimed results, especially in the fields of medicine, physics, chemistry, biology and archaeology.

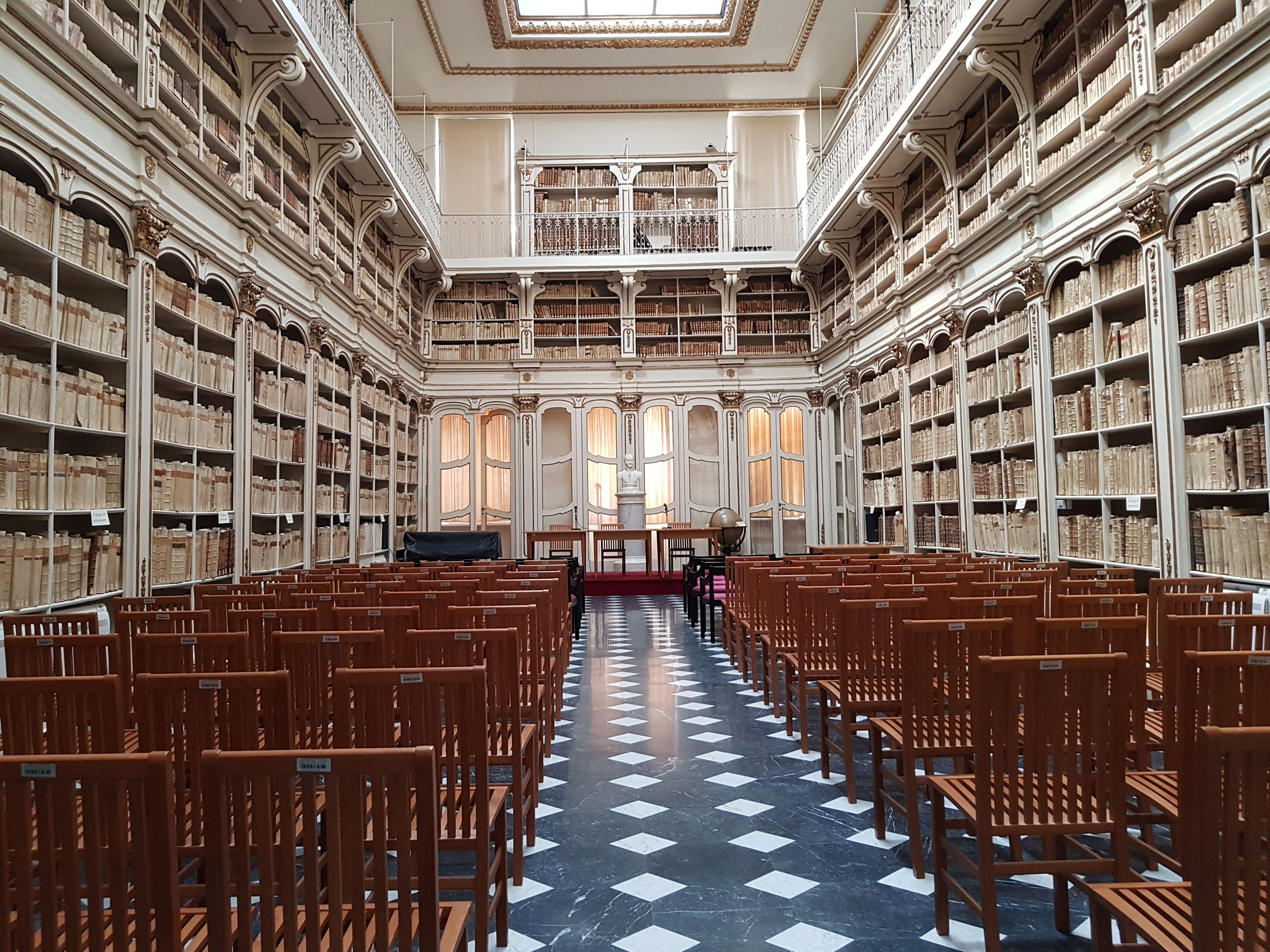
Old library hall of the University of Cagliari

A new university campus on the outskirts of town was recently built in Monserrato, on an area of 73 hectares. It hosts the science faculties, many departments with their respective faculties, and one of the university general hospitals, adequately integrated with other medical institutions.

== Organization ==
These are the 6 faculties in which the university is divided into:

- Faculty of Economic, Jurisprudential and Political Sciences
- Faculty of Humanistic Studies
- Faculty of Engineering and Architecture
- Faculty of Medicine and Surgery
- Faculty of Biology and Pharmacy
- Faculty of Sciences

The university has about 36,000 enrolled students, a teaching staff of over 1,200 and a technical-administrative staff of about 1,300 people.

== Coat of arms ==
The coats of arms of this university are, in the middle, the image of the Very Saint Conception, and at the foot a tiara of Pontiff with letter H that means the name of Saint Hylarius Pope, and below, two Prelate Mitres, in the one on the right hand, a letter L which means the name of Saint Lucifer with Primatial Cross, and in the other hand, the letter E which means the name of Saint Eusebius with his pastoral insignia, and then at the right side of the Virgin, the coats of arms of this Kingdom (of Sardinia), and at left side, the one of this city of Cagliari.

== Notable faculty ==
Among its notable faculty were:

- Corrado Gini, statistician, developer of the Gini Coefficient
- Nicola Abbagnano, philosopher
- Giulio Angioni, writer and anthropologist
- Enrico Bombieri, mathematician
- Giuseppe Brotzu, pharmacologist
- Aldo Capitini, philosopher and politician
- Ernesto de Martino, anthropologist
- Oliviero Diliberto, politician and jurist
- Ludovico Geymonat, philosopher
- Pietro Ichino, politician and jurist
- Margherita Isnardi Parente, philosopher and historian
- Beppo Levi, mathematician
- Doro Levi, archaeologist
- Giovanni Lilliu, archaeologist
- Eva Mameli, botanist
- Antonio Pacinotti, physicist
- Paolo Rossi Monti, philosopher
- Guido Tabellini, economist

== Points of interest ==
- Orto Botanico dell'Università di Cagliari, the university's botanical garden

== See also ==
- List of early modern universities in Europe
- List of Italian universities
- Cagliari
