= Rwanda =

Country in East Africa

Republic of Rwanda
(in other official languages)
| French | République du Rwanda |
| Kinyarwanda | Repubulika y'u Rwanda |
| Swahili | Jamhuri ya Rwanda |
- Flag Emblem
- Motto: Ubumwe, Umurimo, Gukunda Igihugu (Kinyarwanda); Unity, Work, Patriotism (English); Unité, Travail, Patriotisme (French); Umoja, Kazi, Uzalendo (Swahili)
- Anthem: "Rwanda nziza" (English: "Beautiful Rwanda")
- Capital and largest city: Kigali; 1°56′38″S 30°3′34″E
- Official languages: Kinyarwanda; English; French; Swahili
- National language: Kinyarwanda
- Working language: English
- Ethnic groups (1994): 100% Banyarwanda; 85% Hutu; 14% Tutsi; 1% Twa
- Religion: 93.8% Christianity; 3.0% no religion; 2.2% Islam; 1.0% other
- Demonyms: Rwandan; Rwandese
- Government: Unitary semi-presidential republic under an authoritarian dictatorship
  - President: Paul Kagame
  - Prime Minister: Justin Nsengiyumva
  - Speaker of the Chamber of Deputies: Gertrude Kazarwa
- Legislature: Parliament
  - Upper house: Senate
  - Lower house: Chamber of Deputies

Formation
  - Kingdom of Rwanda: 15th century
  - Part of German East Africa: 1897–1916
  - Part of Ruanda-Urundi: 1916–1962
  - Rwandan Revolution: 1959–1961
  - Republic declared: 28 January 1961
  - Independence from Belgium: 1 July 1962
  - Admitted to the UN: 18 September 1962
  - Current constitution: 26 May 2003

Area
  - Total: 26,338 km^{2} (10,169 sq mi) (144th)
  - Water (%): 6.3

Population
  - 2026 estimate: ▲14,418,145 (76th)
  - 2022 census: 13,206,731
  - Density: 578/km^{2} (1,497.0/sq mi) (21st)
- GDP (PPP): 2026 estimate
  - Total: ▲$67.324 billion (126th)
  - Per capita: ▲$4,652 (162nd)
- GDP (nominal): 2026 estimate
  - Total: ▲$18.673 billion (136th)
  - Per capita: ▲$1,291 (173th)
- Gini (2023): ▼39.4 medium inequality
- HDI (2023): ▲0.578 medium (159th)
- Currency: Rwandan franc (RWF)
- Time zone: UTC+2 (CAT)
- Date format: dd/mm/yyyy (AD)
- Calling code: +250
- ISO 3166 code: RW
- Internet TLD: .rw
- Website www.gov.rw

Rwanda, (Note: UK: /ruˈændə/ roo-AN-də, US: /ruˈɑːndə/ roo-AHN-də; Kinyarwanda: u Rwanda [u.ɾɡwaː.nda])) officially the Republic of Rwanda, (Note: Kinyarwanda: Repubulika y'u Rwanda) is a landlocked country in East Africa. Its geography is dominated by mountains in the west and savanna in the southeast. The largest and most notable lakes are mainly in the western and northern regions of the country, and several volcanoes that form part of the Virunga volcanic chain are primarily in the northwest. The climate is considered tropical highland, with two rainy seasons and two dry seasons each year. Its capital and largest city is Kigali, located at the centre of the country, at 1,567 metres above sea level. Rwanda lies a few degrees south of the Equator in the Great Rift Valley of East Africa. Rwanda is bordered by Uganda to the north, Tanzania to the east, Burundi to the south, and the Democratic Republic of the Congo to the west. With a population of about 14 million people living within a total area of 26,338 square kilometres (10,169 sq mi), of which land accounts for about 93.7%, Rwanda is the 21st most densely populated country in the world, with an average of about 578 people per square kilometre (1,500 per square mile).

Hunter-gatherers settled the territory in the Stone and Iron Ages, followed later by Bantu peoples. The population coalesced first into clans, and then into kingdoms. In the 15th century, one kingdom, under King Gihanga, managed to incorporate several of its close neighbour territories establishing the Kingdom of Rwanda. The Kingdom of Rwanda dominated from the mid-eighteenth century, with its Tutsi kings conquering others militarily, centralising power, and enacting unifying policies. In 1897, Germany colonized Rwanda as part of German East Africa, followed by Belgium, which took control in 1916 during World War I. Both European nations ruled through the Rwandan king and perpetuated a pro-Tutsi policy. The Hutu population revolted in 1959. They massacred numerous Tutsi and ultimately established an independent, Hutu-dominated republic in 1962 led by President Grégoire Kayibanda. A 1973 military coup overthrew Kayibanda and brought Juvénal Habyarimana to power, who retained the pro-Hutu policy. The Tutsi-led Rwandan Patriotic Front (RPF) launched a civil war in 1990. Habyarimana was assassinated in April 1994 by unknown parties. Social tensions erupted in the Rwandan genocide carried out by Hutu Power extremists against the Tutsis. The RPF ended the genocide with a military victory in July 1994.

Rwanda has been governed by the RPF as a de facto one-party state since 1994 with former commander Paul Kagame serving as president since 2000. The country has been governed by a series of centralized authoritarian governments since precolonial times. Although Rwanda has low levels of corruption compared with neighbouring countries, it ranks among the lowest in international measurements of government transparency and civil liberties, despite recent gains that have elevated it to the medium category on the Human Development Index. The population is young and predominantly rural; Rwanda has one of the youngest populations in the world. Rwandans are drawn from just one cultural and linguistic group, the Banyarwanda. However, within this group there are three subgroups: the Hutu, Tutsi, and Twa. The Twa are forest-dwelling Central African foragers and are often considered descendants of Rwanda's earliest inhabitants. Christianity is the largest religion in the country; the principal and national language is Kinyarwanda, spoken by native Rwandans, with English, French, and Swahili serving as additional official languages.

Rwanda's economy is based on services, agricultural exports, and manufacturing. Coffee and tea are the major cash crops that it exports, although it is surpassed in banana production. Tourism is a fast-growing sector and is now the country's leading foreign exchange earner. As of the most recent survey in 2024, 30.5% of the population is affected by multidimensional poverty with 27.4% under the national poverty line. The country is a member of the African Union, the United Nations, the Commonwealth of Nations (one of the few members without a historical link to the British Empire), COMESA, the OIF, and the East African Community.

== Etymology ==
The name Rwanda derives from the word Ku-aanda, meaning "expansion" or "spreading out from the centre", reflecting the historical growth of the Kingdom of Rwanda.

== History ==
=== Early history ===
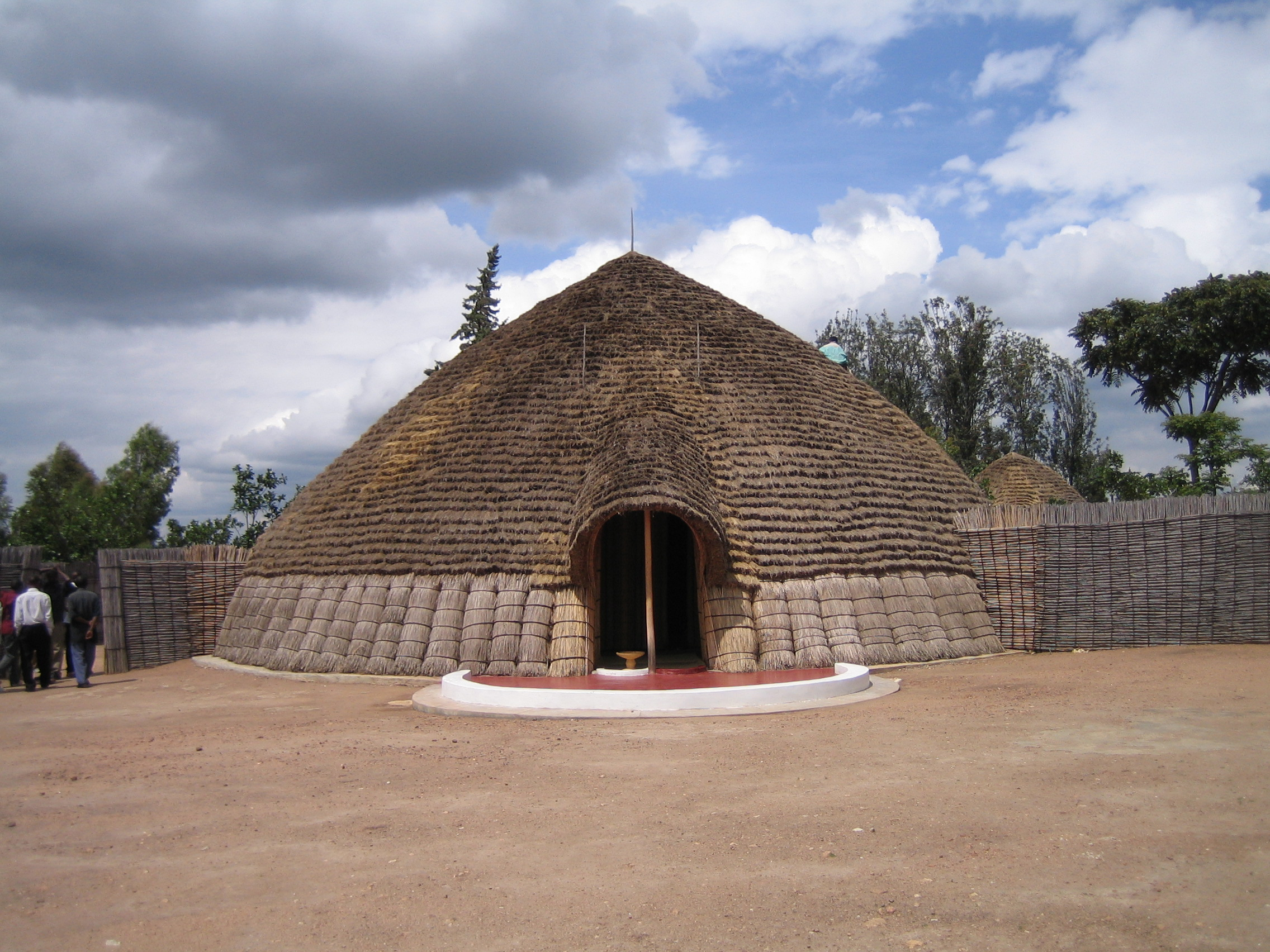
A reconstruction of the ancient King's Palace at Nyanza

Modern human settlement of what is now Rwanda dates from, at the latest, the last glacial period, either in the Neolithic period around 8,000 BC, or in the long humid period which followed, up to around 3,000 BC. Archaeological excavations have revealed evidence of sparse settlement by hunter-gatherers in the late Stone Age, followed by a larger population of early Iron Age settlers, who produced dimpled pottery and iron tools. These early inhabitants were the ancestors of the Twa, aboriginal pygmy hunter-gatherers who remain in Rwanda today. Then by 3,000 BC, Central Sudanic and Kuliak farmers and herders began settling into Rwanda, followed by South Cushitic–speaking herders in 2,000 BC. The forest-dwelling Twa lost much of their habitat and moved to the mountain slopes. Between 800 BC and 1500 AD, a number of Bantu groups migrated into Rwanda, clearing forest land for agriculture. Historians have several theories regarding the nature of the Bantu migrations; one theory is that the first settlers were Hutu, while the Tutsi migrated later to form a distinct racial group, possibly of Nilo-hamitic origin. An alternative theory is that the migration was slow and steady, with incoming groups integrating into rather than conquering the existing society. Under this theory, the Hutu and Tutsi distinction arose later and was a class distinction rather than a racial one. The earliest form of social organisation in the area was the clan (ubwoko). The clans were not limited to genealogical lineages or geographical area, and most included Hutu, Tutsi, and Twa. From the 15th century, the clans began to merge into kingdoms.

=== Kingdom of Rwanda ===
One kingdom, under King Gihanga, managed to incorporate several of its close neighbour territories establishing the Kingdom of Rwanda. By 1700, around eight kingdoms had existed in the present-day Rwanda. One of these, the Kingdom of Rwanda ruled by the Tutsi Nyiginya clan, became increasingly dominant from the mid-18th century. The kingdom reached its greatest extent during the 19th century under the reign of King Kigeli Rwabugiri. Rwabugiri conquered several smaller states, expanded the kingdom west and north, and initiated administrative reforms; these included ubuhake, in which Tutsi patrons ceded cattle, and therefore privileged status, to Hutu or Tutsi clients in exchange for economic and personal service, and uburetwa, a corvée system in which Hutu were forced to work for Tutsi chiefs. Rwabugiri's changes caused a rift to grow between the Hutu and Tutsi populations. The Twa were better off than in pre-Kingdom days, with some becoming dancers in the royal court, but their numbers continued to decline.

=== German colonisation ===
The Berlin Conference of 1884 assigned the territory to the German Empire, who declared it to be part of German East Africa. In 1894, explorer Gustav Adolf von Götzen was the first European to cross the entire territory of Rwanda; he crossed from the south-east to Lake Kivu and met the king. In 1897, Germany established a presence in Rwanda with the formation of an alliance with the king, beginning the colonial era. The Germans did not significantly alter the social structure of the country, but exerted influence by supporting the king and the existing hierarchy, and delegating power to local chiefs.

=== Belgian mandate of Ruanda-Urundi ===
Belgian forces invaded Rwanda and Burundi in 1916, during World War I, and later, in 1922, they started to rule both Rwanda and Burundi as a League of Nations mandate called Ruanda-Urundi and started a period of more direct colonial rule. The Belgians simplified and centralised the power structure, introduced large-scale projects in education, health, public works, and agricultural supervision, including new crops and improved agricultural techniques to try to reduce the incidence of famine. Both the Germans and the Belgians, in the wake of New Imperialism, promoted Tutsi supremacy, considering the Hutu and Tutsi different races. In 1935, Belgium introduced an identity card system, which labelled each individual as either Tutsi, Hutu, Twa or Naturalised. While it had been previously possible for particularly wealthy Hutu to become honorary Tutsi, the identity cards prevented any further movement between the classes.

Belgium continued to rule Ruanda-Urundi (of which Rwanda formed the northern part) as a UN trust territory after the Second World War, with a mandate to oversee eventual independence. Tensions escalated between the Tutsi, who favoured early independence, and the Hutu emancipation movement, culminating in the 1959 Rwandan Revolution: Hutu activists began killing Tutsi and destroying their houses, forcing more than 100,000 people to seek refuge in neighbouring countries.

=== First Republic ===
In 1961, the suddenly pro-Hutu Belgians held a referendum in which the country voted to abolish the monarchy. Rwanda was separated from Burundi and gained independence on 1 July 1962, which is commemorated as Independence Day, a national holiday. Cycles of violence followed, with mainly Tutsi exile rebels attacking from neighbouring countries and the Hutu-led government retaliating with large-scale slaughter and repression of the Tutsi civilians inside Rwanda.

=== Second Republic ===
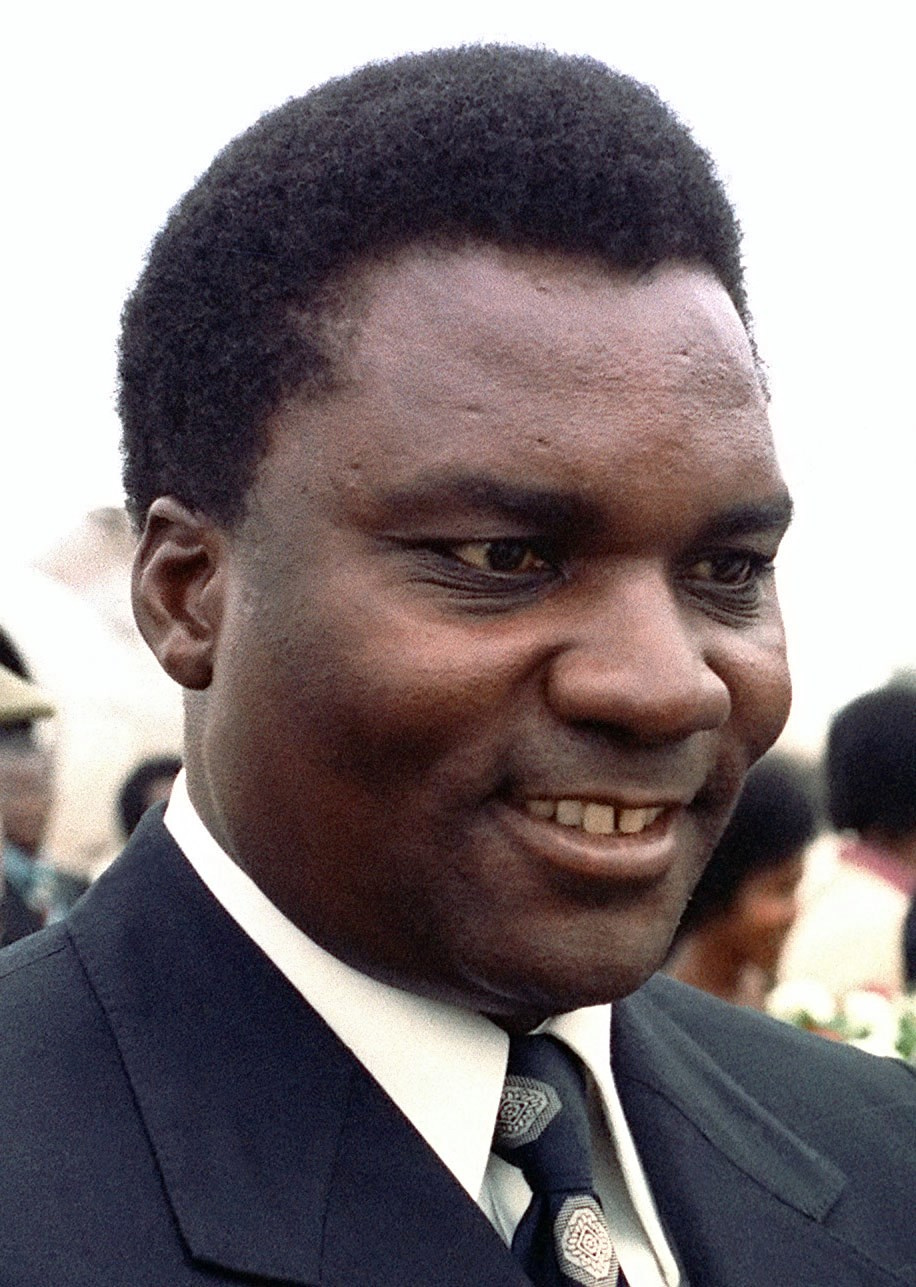
Juvénal Habyarimana, president from 1973 to 1994

In 1973, Juvénal Habyarimana took power in a military coup. Pro-Hutu discrimination continued, but there was greater economic prosperity and a reduced amount of violence against the Tutsi. The Twa remained marginalised, and by 1990 were almost entirely forced out of the forests by the government; many became beggars. Rwanda's population had increased from 1.6 million people in 1934 to 7.1 million in 1989, leading to competition for land.

In 1990, the Rwandan Patriotic Front (RPF), a rebel group composed of Tutsi refugees, invaded northern Rwanda from their base in Uganda, initiating the Rwandan Civil War. The group condemned the Hutu-dominated government for failing to democratize and confront the problems facing these refugees. Neither side was able to gain a decisive advantage in the war, but by 1992 it had weakened Habyarimana's authority; mass demonstrations forced him into a coalition with the domestic opposition and eventually to sign the 1993 Arusha Accords with the RPF.

=== Rwandan Genocide and Civil War ===
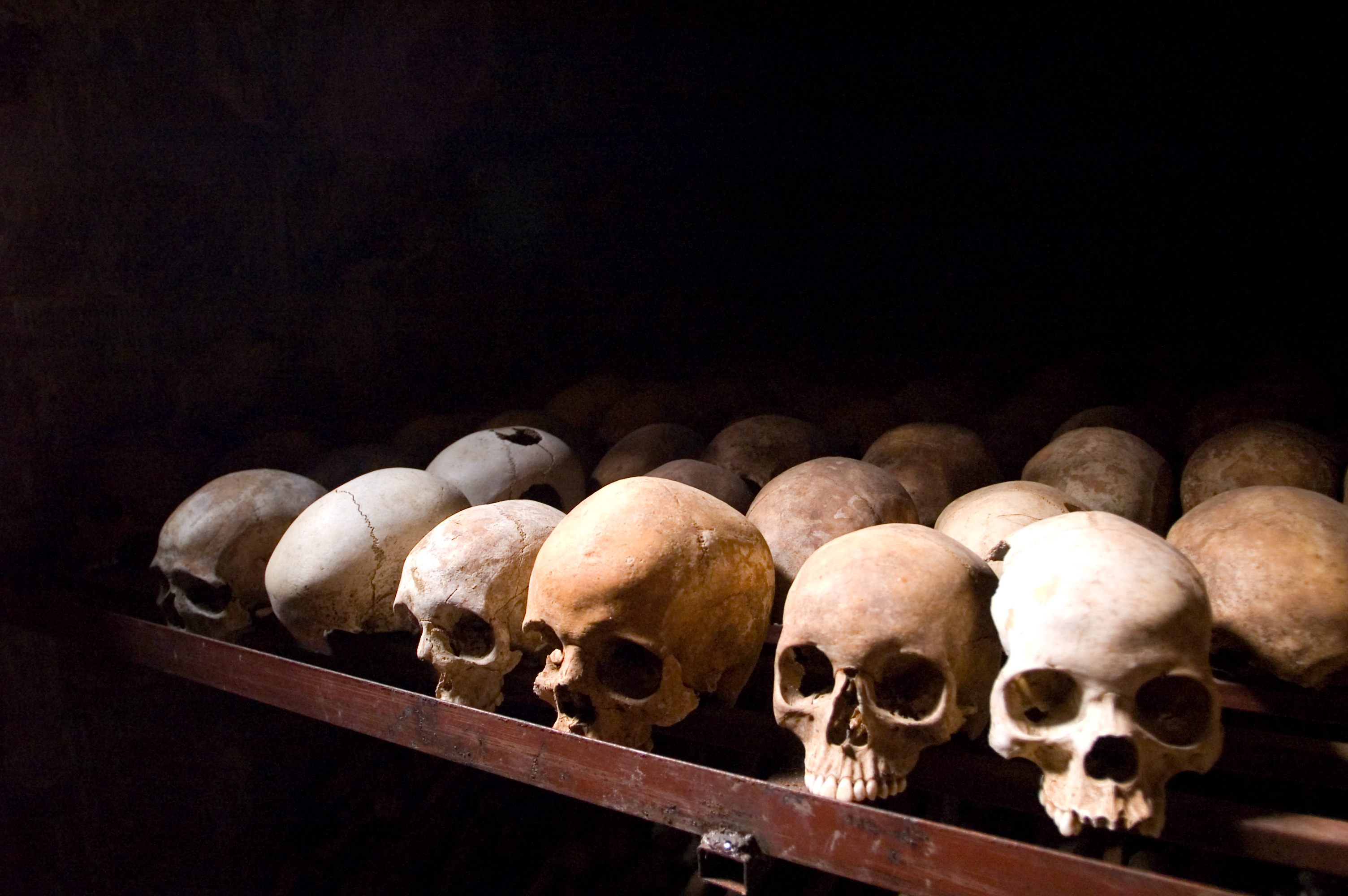
Human skulls at the Nyamata Genocide Memorial.

The cease-fire ended on 6 April 1994 when Habyarimana's plane was shot down near Kigali Airport, killing him. The shooting down of the plane served as the catalyst for the Rwandan genocide, which began within a few hours. Over the course of approximately 100 days, between 500,000 and 1,000,000 Tutsi and politically moderate Hutu were killed in well-planned attacks on the orders of the interim government. Many Twa were also killed, despite not being directly targeted.

The Tutsi RPF restarted their offensive, and took control of the country methodically, gaining control of the whole country by mid-July. The international response to the genocide was limited, with major powers reluctant to strengthen the already overstretched UN peacekeeping force. When the RPF took over, approximately two million Hutu fled to neighbouring countries, in particular Zaïre, fearing reprisals; additionally, the RPF-led army was a key belligerent in the First and Second Congo Wars. Within Rwanda, a period of reconciliation and justice began, with the establishment of the International Criminal Tribunal for Rwanda (ICTR) and the reintroduction of Gacaca, a traditional village court system.

=== 21st century ===
In a bid to promote national unity and reconciliation, Rwanda's new flag and national anthem were unveiled at the end of 2001, removing overt ethnic distinctions in official state identity. Since 2000 Rwanda's economy, tourist numbers, and Human Development Index have grown rapidly; between 2006 and 2011 the poverty rate reduced from 57% to 45%, while life expectancy rose from 46.6 years in 2000 to 65.4 years in 2021.

== Politics and government ==
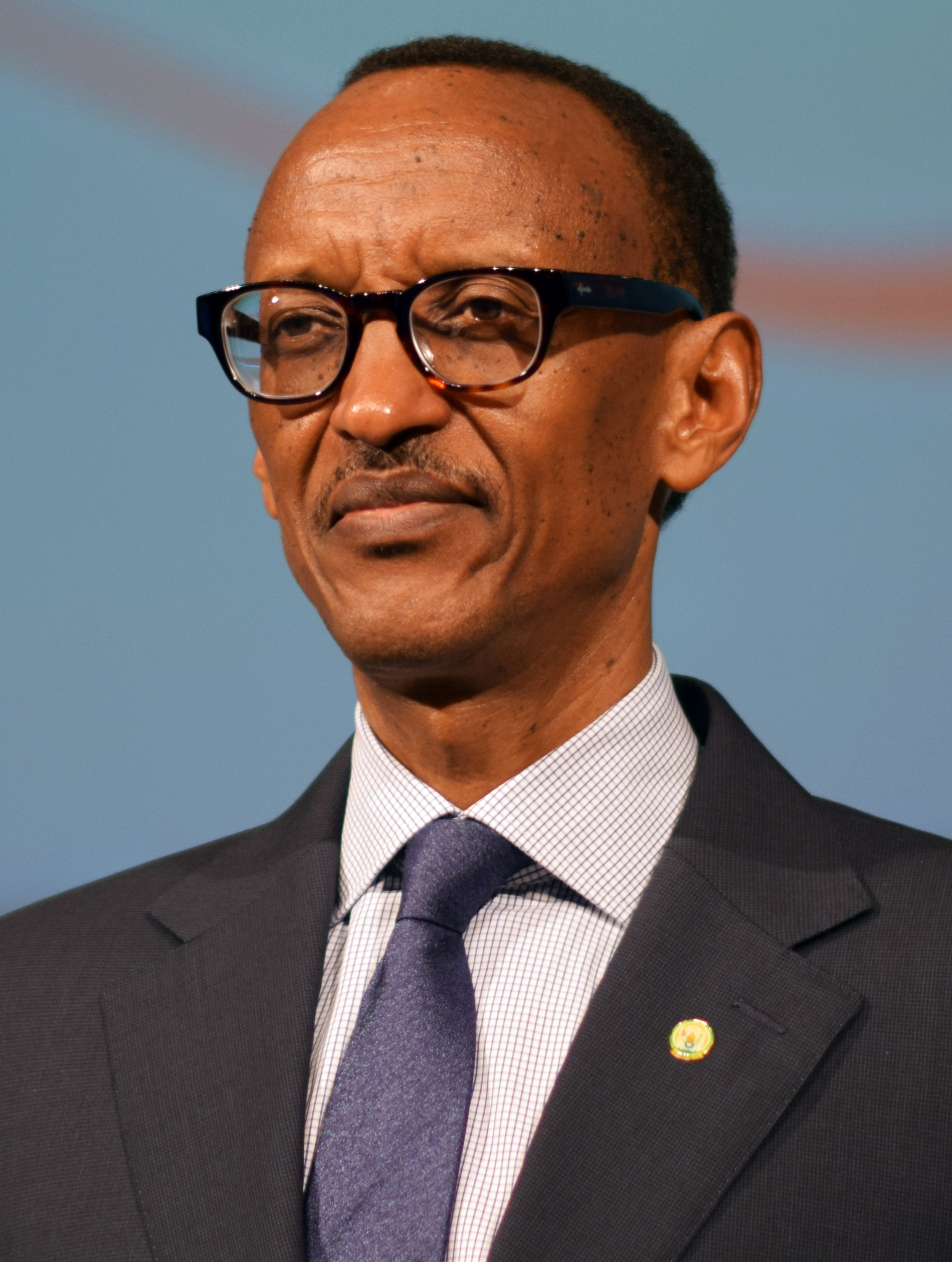
Rwandan President Paul Kagame

Rwanda is a de facto one-party state ruled by the Rwandan Patriotic Front (RPF) and its leader Paul Kagame continuously since the end of the civil war in 1994. Although Rwanda is nominally democratic, elections are manipulated in various ways, which include banning opposition parties, arresting or assassinating critics, and electoral fraud. The RPF is a Tutsi-dominated party but receives support from other communities as well.

The constitution was adopted following a national referendum in 2003, replacing the transitional constitution which had been in place since 1994. The constitution mandates a multi-party system of government, with politics based on democracy and elections. However, the constitution places conditions on how political parties may operate. Article 54 states that "political organizations are prohibited from basing themselves on race, ethnic group, tribe, clan, region, sex, religion or any other division which may give rise to discrimination". The president of Rwanda is the head of state, and has broad powers including creating policy in conjunction with the Cabinet of Rwanda, commanding the Rwandan Defence Force, negotiating and ratifying treaties, signing presidential orders, and declaring war or a state of emergency. The president is elected every five years, and appoints the prime minister and all other members of the Cabinet. The Parliament consists of two chambers. It makes legislation and is empowered by the constitution to oversee the activities of the president and the Cabinet. The lower chamber is the Chamber of Deputies, which has 80 members serving five-year terms. Twenty-four of these seats are reserved for women, elected through a joint assembly of local government officials; another three seats are reserved for youth and disabled members; the remaining 53 are elected by universal suffrage under a proportional representation system.

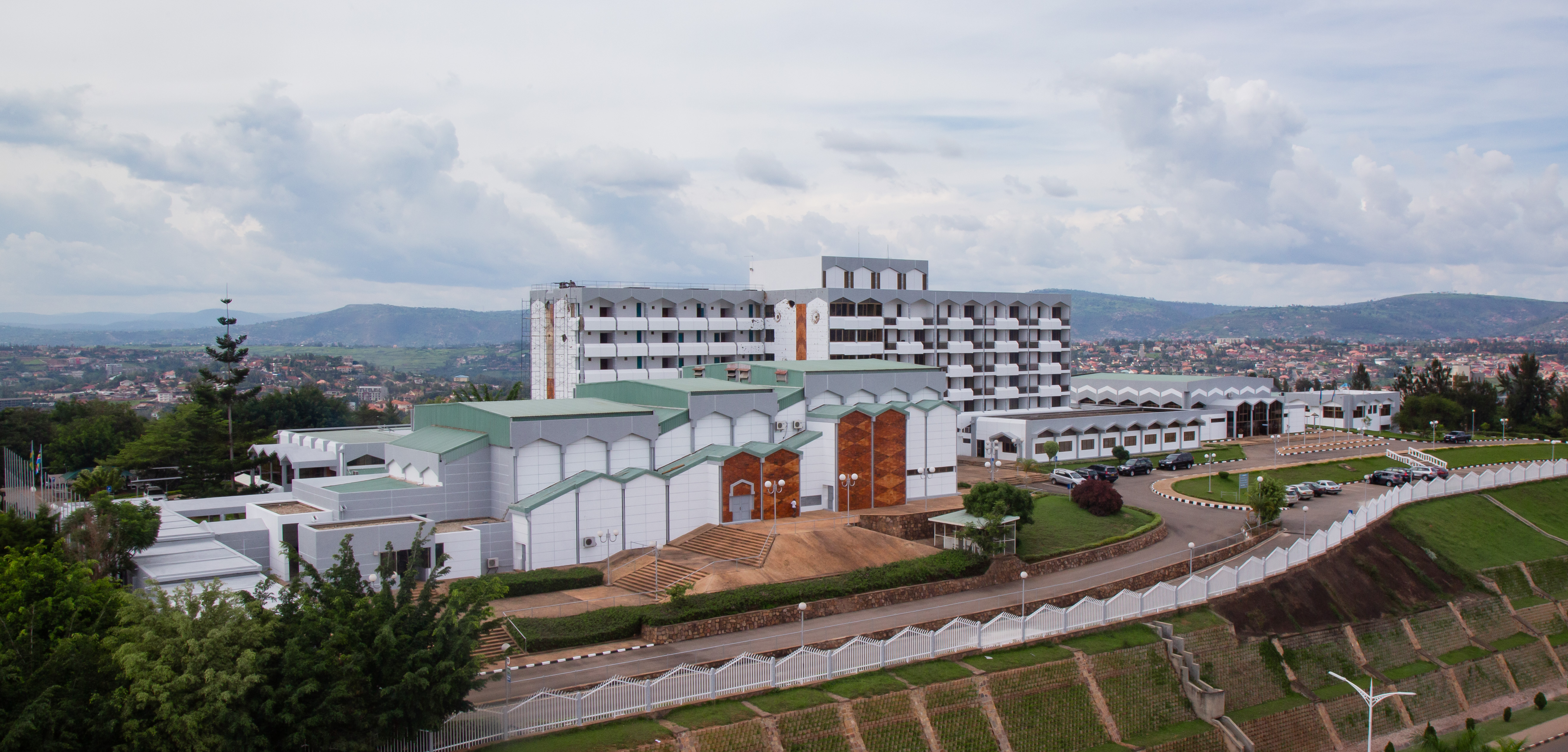
Chamber of Deputies building

Rwanda's legal system is largely based on German and Belgian civil law systems and customary law. The judiciary is independent of the executive branch, although the president and the Senate are involved in the appointment of Supreme Court judges. Human Rights Watch has praised the Rwandan government for progress made in the delivery of justice including the abolition of the death penalty, but also alleges interference in the judicial system by members of the government, such as the politically motivated appointment of judges, misuse of prosecutorial power, and pressure on judges to make particular decisions. The constitution provides for two types of courts: ordinary and specialised. Ordinary courts are the Supreme Court, the High Court, and regional courts, while specialised courts are military courts and a system of commercial courts created in 2011 to expedite commercial litigations. Between 2004 and 2012, a system of Gacaca courts was in operation. Gacaca, a Rwandan traditional court operated by villages and communities, was revived to expedite the trials of genocide suspects. The court succeeded in clearing the backlog of genocide cases, but was criticised by human rights groups as not meeting legal fair standard.

Rwanda has low corruption levels relative to most other African countries; in 2014, Transparency International ranked Rwanda as the fifth-cleanest out of 47 countries in Sub-Saharan Africa and 55th-cleanest out of 175 in the world. The constitution provides for an ombudsman, whose duties include prevention and fighting of corruption. Public officials (including the president) are required by the constitution to declare their wealth to the ombudsman and to the public; those who do not comply are suspended from office. Despite this, Human Rights Watch notes extensive political repression throughout the country, including illegal and arbitrary detention, threats or other forms of intimidation, disappearances, politically motivated trials, and the massacre of peacefully protesting civilians.

Rwandan Prime Minister Justin Nsengiyumva with Russian President Vladimir Putin at the Third Russia–Africa Summit in Moscow, October 2026

Rwanda is a member of the United Nations, African Union, Francophonie, East African Community, and the Commonwealth of Nations. For many years during the Habyarimana regime, the country maintained close ties with France, as well as Belgium, the former colonial power. Under the RPF government, however, Rwanda has sought closer ties with neighbouring countries in the East African Community and with the English-speaking world. Diplomatic relations with France were suspended in 2006 following the indictment of Rwandan officials by a French judge, and despite their restoration in 2010, as of 2015 relations between the countries remain strained. Relations with the Democratic Republic of the Congo were tense following Rwanda's involvement in the First and Second Congo Wars; the Congolese army alleged Rwandan attacks on their troops, while Rwanda blamed the Congolese government for failing to suppress Hutu rebels in North and South Kivu provinces. In 2010, the United Nations released a report accusing the Rwandan army of committing wide scale human rights violations and crimes against humanity in the Democratic Republic of the Congo during the First and Second Congo Wars, charges denied by the Rwandan government. Relations soured further in 2012, as Kinshasa accused Rwanda of supporting the M23 rebellion, an insurgency in the eastern Congo. In 2015 peace had been restored and relations were improving, but by January 2025 renewed Rwandan support for the M23 rebellion caused DR Congo to sever diplomatic relations in the wake of the 2025 Goma offensive.

Rwanda's relationship with Uganda was also tense for much of the 2000s following a 1999 clash between the two countries' armies as they backed opposing rebel groups in the Second Congo War, but improved significantly in the early 2010s. In 2019, relations between the two countries deteriorated, with Rwanda closing its borders with Uganda.

On 25 January 2025, the Democratic Republic of the Congo broke off diplomatic ties with Rwanda over its alleged support for the M23 rebel group operating in the country.

=== Military ===
The national military is the Rwandan Defence Force (RDF), which consists of the Rwanda Land Forces, the Rwandan Air Force, and specialized service branches. The RDF was established following the 1994 civil war from the ranks of the Rwandan Patriotic Front (RPF) rebel army, replacing the former government's Forces Armées Rwandaises (FAR). Enlistment in the RDF is entirely voluntary, and the minimum age for recruitment is 18 years. Military expenditure constitutes a notable portion of the national budget, reflecting the country's proactive regional security doctrine.

Despite its relatively small geographic size, Rwanda maintains one of the most operationally active militaries in East Africa. The country has evolved into one of the largest contributors of personnel to United Nations peacekeeping operations globally, consistently ranking among the top three troop-contributing countries alongside Nepal and Bangladesh. RDF battalions and formed police units are heavily deployed in stabilization missions across the continent, most notably under the United Nations Multidimensional Integrated Stabilization Mission in the Central African Republic (MINUSCA) and previously under the African Union-United Nations Hybrid Operation in Darfur (UNAMID).

In addition to multilateral UN mandates, Rwanda frequently utilizes independent bilateral military interventions to address regional crises. Since July 2021, the RDF has maintained a substantial deployment in northern Mozambique's Cabo Delgado province to combat Islamist insurgencies. Following the withdrawal of the Southern African Development Community Mission in Mozambique (SAMIM) in 2024, the footprint expanded dramatically. As of 2026, official statements from the deployment command indicated that more than 6,300 Rwandan soldiers and security personnel were active in the province to degrade insurgent capabilities and secure infrastructure. Domestically, the RDF is highly institutionalized in civilian development projects, deploying military engineers, medical staff, and logistics units to build public infrastructure and schools during an annual outreach campaign known as the "RDF Citizen Production Army".

== Administrative divisions ==
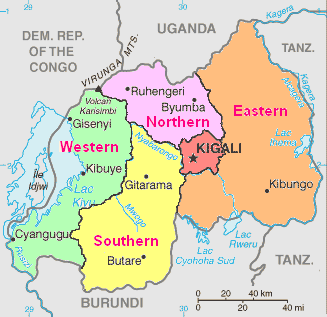
Provinces of Rwanda

Before western colonization, the Rwandan government system had a quasi-system of political pluralism and power sharing. Despite there being a strict hierarchy, the pre-colonial system achieved an established, combined system of "centralized power and decentralized autonomous units." Under the monarch, the elected Chief governed a province that was divided into multiple districts. Two other officials appointed by head Chief governed the districts; one official was allocated power over the land while the other oversaw cattle. The king (mwami) exercised control through a system of provinces, districts, hills, and neighbourhoods. As of 2003, the constitution divided Rwanda into provinces (intara), districts (uturere), cities, municipalities, towns, sectors (imirenge), cells (utugari), and villages (imidugudu); the larger divisions, and their borders, are established by Parliament. In January 2006, Rwanda was reorganized such that twelve provinces were merged to create five, and 106 districts were merged into thirty. The present borders drawn in 2006 aimed at decentralising power and removing associations with the old system and the genocide. The previous structure of twelve provinces associated with the largest cities was replaced with five provinces based primarily on geography. These are Northern Province, Southern Province, Eastern Province, Western Province, and the Municipality of Kigali in the centre.

The five provinces act as intermediaries between the national government and their constituent districts to ensure that national policies are implemented at the district level. The Rwanda Decentralisation Strategic Framework developed by the Ministry of Local Government assigns to provinces the responsibility for "coordinating governance issues in the Province, as well as monitoring and evaluation". Each province is headed by a governor, appointed by the president and approved by the Senate. The districts are responsible for coordinating public service delivery and economic development. They are divided into sectors, which are responsible for the delivery of public services as mandated by the districts. Districts and sectors have directly elected councils, and are run by an executive committee selected by that council. The cells and villages are the smallest political units, providing a link between the people and the sectors. All adult resident citizens are members of their local cell council, from which an executive committee is elected. The city of Kigali is a provincial-level authority, which coordinates urban planning within the city.

== Geography ==
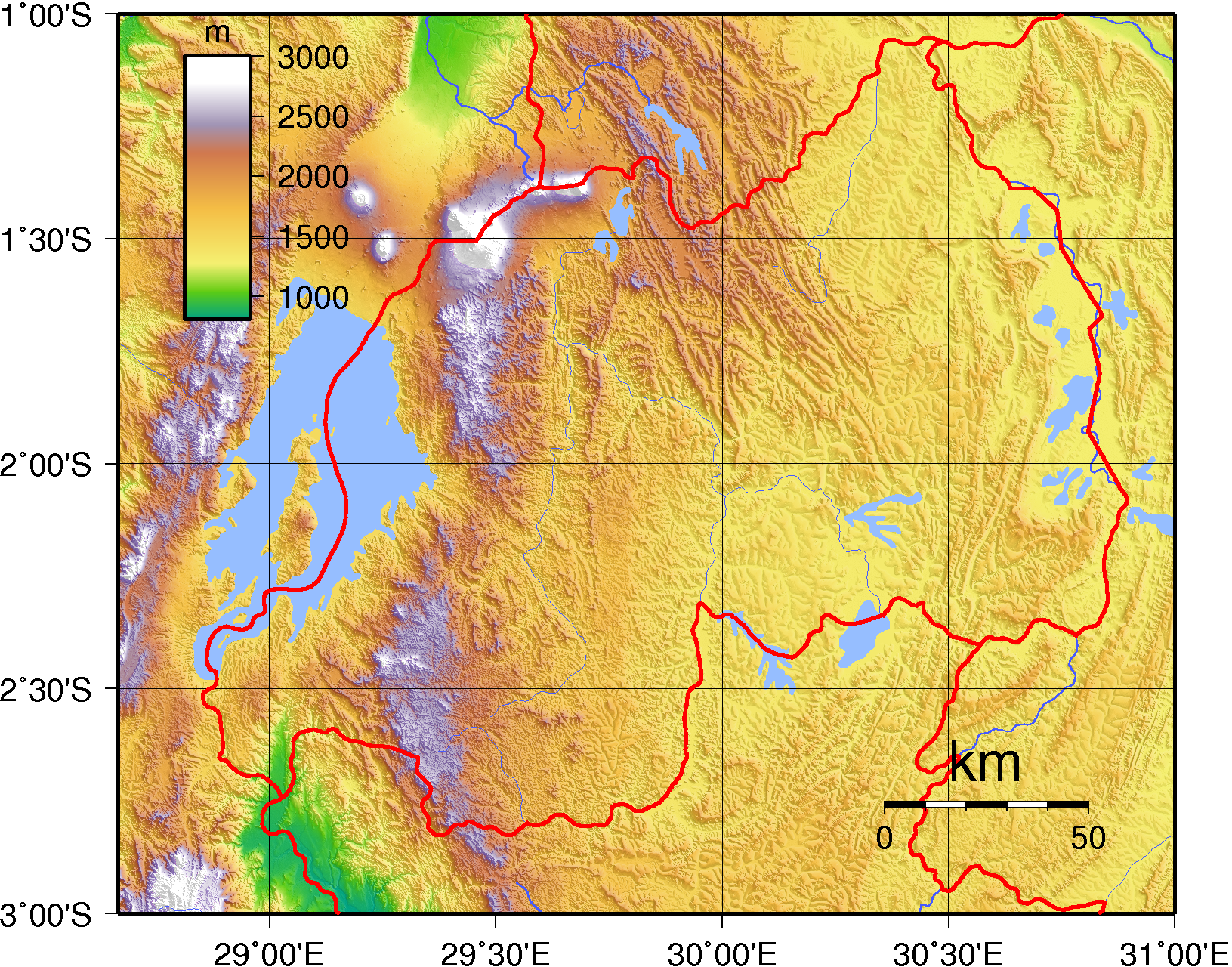
Topography of Rwanda

Rwanda is located in East Africa, in the eastern-central part of the African continent, between 1° and 3° S latitude and between 29° and 31° E longitude. Its geography is characterized by rolling highlands, mountains, and numerous lakes. At 26,338 square kilometres (10,169 sq mi), Rwanda is the world's 144th-largest country, and the fourth smallest on the African mainland after Gambia, Eswatini, and Djibouti. It is comparable in size to Burundi, Haiti and Albania. The entire country is at a high altitude: the lowest point is the Rusizi River at 950 metres (3,117 ft) above sea level.

The watershed between the major Congo and Nile drainage basins runs from north to south through Rwanda, with around 80% of the country's area draining into the Nile and 20% into the Congo via the Rusizi River and Lake Tanganyika. The country's longest river is the Nyabarongo, which rises in the south-west, flows north, east, and southeast before merging with the Ruvubu to form the Kagera; the Kagera then flows due north along the eastern border with Tanzania. The Nyabarongo-Kagera eventually drains into Lake Victoria, and its source in Nyungwe Forest is a contender for the as-yet undetermined overall source of the Nile. Rwanda has many lakes, the largest being Lake Kivu. This lake occupies the floor of the Albertine Rift along most of the length of Rwanda's western border, and with a maximum depth of 480 metres (1,575 ft), it is one of the twenty deepest lakes in the world. Other sizeable lakes include Burera, Ruhondo, Muhazi, Rweru, and Ihema, the last being the largest of a string of lakes in the eastern plains of Akagera National Park.

Mountains dominate central and western Rwanda and the country is sometimes called "Pays des mille collines" in French ("Land of a thousand hills"). They are part of the Albertine Rift Mountains that flank the Albertine branch of the East African Rift, which runs from north to south along Rwanda's western border. The highest peaks are found in the Virunga volcano chain in the northwest; this includes Mount Karisimbi, Rwanda's highest point, at 4,507 metres (14,787 ft). This western section of the country lies within the Albertine Rift montane forests ecoregion. It has an elevation of 1,500 to 2,500 metres (4,921 to 8,202 ft). The centre of the country is predominantly rolling hills, while the eastern border region consists of savanna, plains and swamps.

=== Climate ===
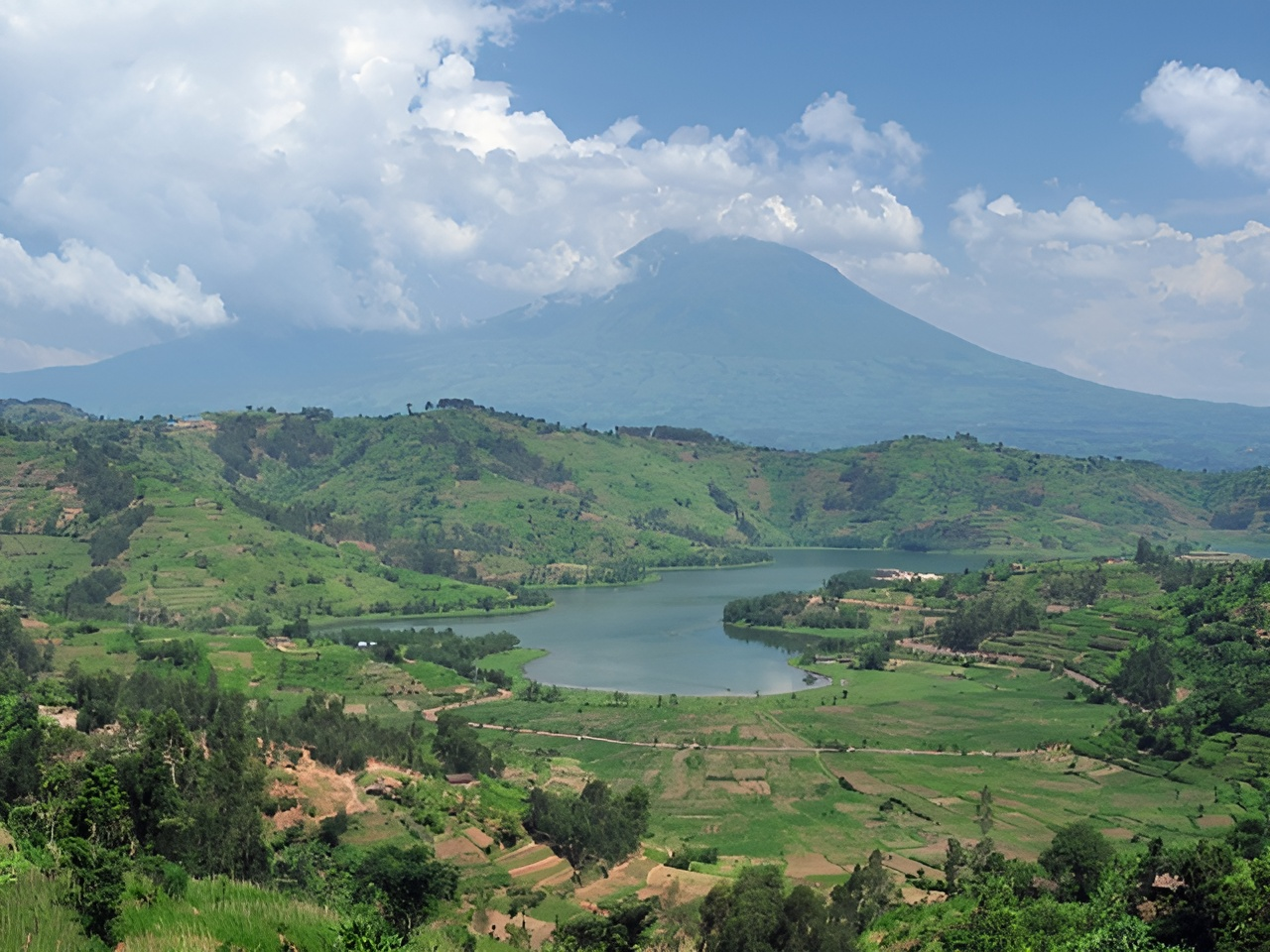
Lake and volcano in the Virunga Mountains

Rwanda has a tropical highland climate, with lower temperatures than are typical for equatorial countries because of its high elevation. Precipitation usually ranges from 1,000 to 1,400 millimetres per year, depending on the area. Kigali, in the centre of the country, has a typical daily temperature range between 15 and 28 °C (59 and 82 °F), with little variation through the year. There are some temperature variations across the country; the mountainous west and north are generally cooler than the lower-lying east. There are two rainy seasons in the year; the first runs from February to June and the second from September to December. These are separated by two dry seasons: the major one from June to September, during which there is often no rain at all, and a shorter and less severe one from December to February. Rainfall varies geographically, with the west and northwest of the country receiving more precipitation annually than the east and southeast. Global warming has caused a change in the pattern of the rainy seasons. According to a report by the Strategic Foresight Group, change in climate has reduced the number of rainy days experienced during a year, but has also caused an increase in frequency of torrential rains. Both changes have caused difficulty for farmers, decreasing their productivity. Strategic Foresight also characterise Rwanda as a fast warming country, with an increase in average temperature of between 0.7 °C to 0.9 °C over fifty years.

=== Biodiversity ===
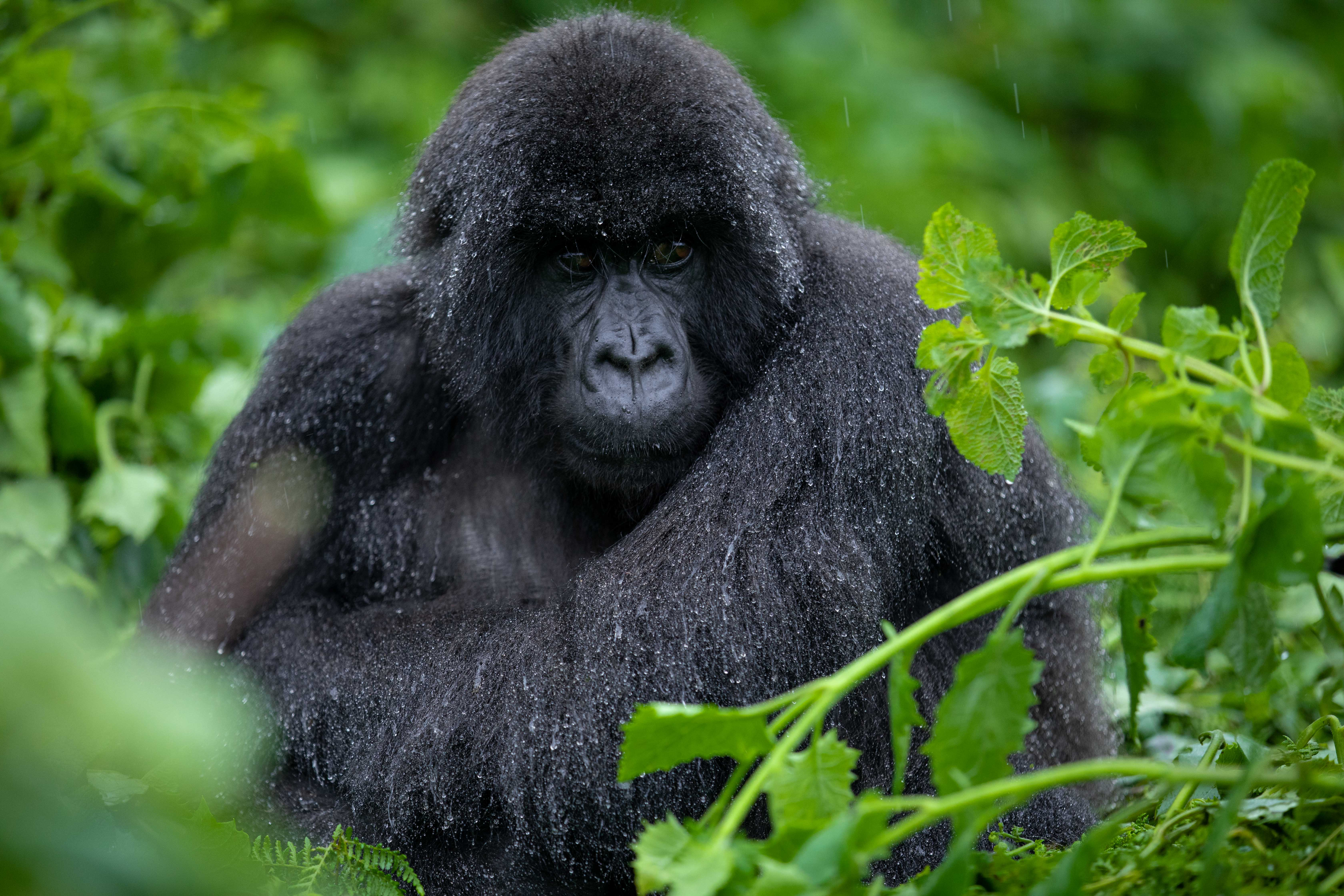
Volcanoes National Park is the home of the largest population of mountain gorillas in the world.

In prehistoric times, montane forest occupied one-third of the territory of present-day Rwanda. Naturally occurring vegetation is now mostly restricted to the three national parks, with terraced agriculture dominating the rest of the country. Nyungwe, the largest remaining tract of forest, contains 200 species of tree as well as orchids and begonias. Vegetation in the Volcanoes National Park is mostly bamboo and moorland, with small areas of forest. By contrast, Akagera has a savanna ecosystem in which acacia dominates the flora. There are several rare or endangered plant species in Akagera, including Markhamia lutea and Eulophia guineensis.

The greatest diversity of large mammals is found in the three national parks, which are designated conservation areas. Akagera contains typical savanna animals such as giraffes and elephants, while Volcanoes is home to an estimated one-third of the worldwide mountain gorilla population. Nyungwe Forest boasts thirteen primate species including common chimpanzees and Ruwenzori colobus arboreal monkeys; the Ruwenzori colobus move in groups of up to 400 individuals, the largest troop size of any primate in Africa.

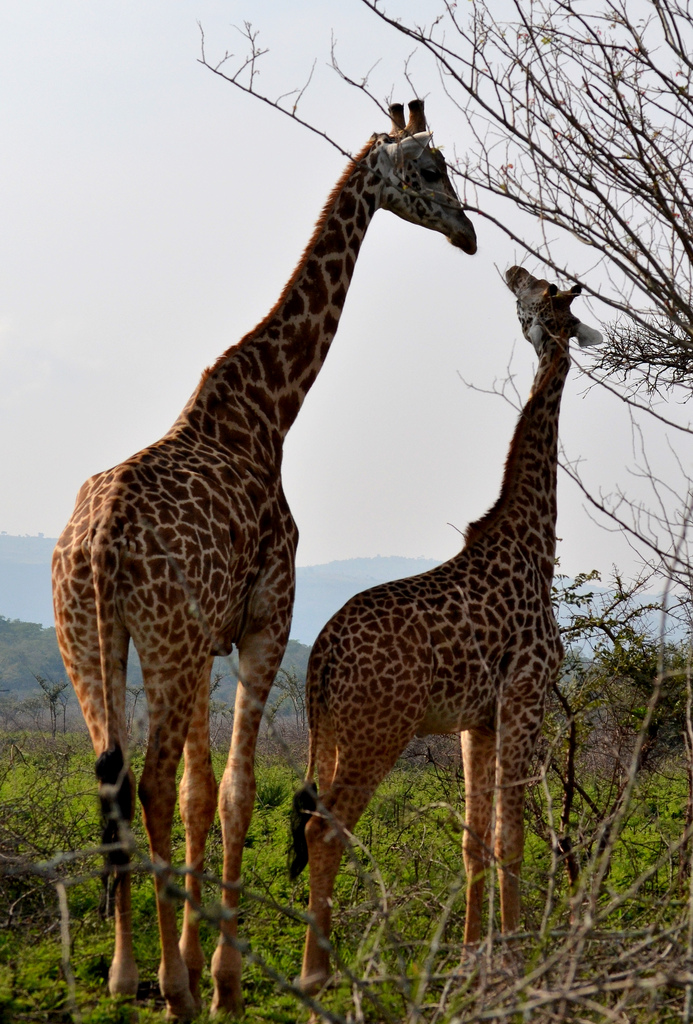
Giraffe in Akagera National Park

Rwanda's population of lions was destroyed in the aftermath of the genocide of 1994, as national parks were turned into camps for displaced people and the remaining animals were poisoned by cattle herders. In June 2015, two South African parks donated seven lions to Akagera National Park, reestablishing a lion population in Rwanda. The lions were held initially in a fenced-off area of the park, and then collared and released into the wild a month later.

Eighteen endangered black rhinos were brought to Rwanda in 2017 from South Africa. After positive results, five more black rhinos were delivered to Akagera National Park from zoos all over Europe in 2019.

Similarly, the white rhino population is growing in Rwanda. In 2021, Rwanda received 30 white rhinos from South Africa with the goal of Akagera being a safe breeding ground for the near-threatened species.

There are 670 bird species in Rwanda, with variation between the east and the west. Nyungwe Forest, in the west, has 280 recorded species, of which 26 are endemic to the Albertine Rift; endemic species include the Rwenzori turaco and handsome spurfowl. Eastern Rwanda, by contrast, features savanna birds such as the black-headed gonolek and those associated with swamps and lakes, including storks and cranes.

Recent entomological work in the country has revealed a rich diversity of praying mantises, including a new species Dystacta tigrifrutex, dubbed the "bush tiger mantis".

Rwanda contains three terrestrial ecoregions: Albertine Rift montane forests, Victoria Basin forest-savanna mosaic, and Ruwenzori-Virunga montane moorlands. The country had a 2019 Forest Landscape Integrity Index mean score of 3.85/10, ranking it 139th globally out of 172 countries.

== Economy ==
Rwanda's economy suffered heavily during the 1994 genocide, with widespread loss of life, failure to maintain infrastructure, looting, and neglect of important cash crops. This caused a large drop in GDP and heavily damaged the country's ability to attract private and external investment. However, in the 2000s Rwanda witnessed an economic boom which improved the standard of living for many Rwandans. The economy of Rwanda has expanded consistently since the 1994 genocide, with real GDP growth of 8.2% in 2023, 8.9% in 2024, and 9.4% in 2025; as reported by the National Institute of Statistics of Rwanda. Growth is projected to be 7.5% in 2026, and the government is actively pursuing policies to encourage industrial growth, such as the "Made In Rwanda".

As of the most recent survey in 2024, 30.5% of the population are affected by multidimensional poverty with 27.4% of the population under the national poverty line, a significant drop from the monetary poverty of 60.3% in 2000. The UN classification for extreme poverty, or living below US$3 per day, estimates 38.5% of individuals fall in this category. In 2024, the country was classified by the UN as one of forty-four least developed countries (LDC), despite recent progress in growth. Rwanda's GNI per capita is US$3,620, and represents an 11.04% growth from 2023.

Rwanda's economy is mainly driven by the service sector, which has seen frequent growth. Service sector production constitutes 52% of total GDP, followed by industry (22%) and agriculture (20%). Agriculture, including for subsistence and cash crops, have a much higher share of employment than the other sectors (64.5%). More than two thirds of households in the country engage in agriculture, primarily undertaking crop farming and livestock rearing.

=== Trade ===
In 2024 top export markets include United Arab Emirates, Democratic Republic of the Congo, China, South Sudan and the United Kingdom. Total merchandise exports, which exclude services, increased nearly 30% from 2023 to 2024. Primary exports are agriculture products, including horticulture products, coffee, tea and processed agriculture goods. Other major exports include precious stones and metal and ores, oil and manufactured goods (agro-processing, cement, furniture, textiles and plastic pipes). Rwanda imports from its main partners, including China, India, South Korea and Germany. Local importers within Africa make up nearly 20% of total imports and include Uganda, Tanzania, Kenya, and Egypt. Key imports include oil and petroleum products, sugar, telephones and electronics, and packaged healthcare supplies.

=== Agriculture ===
Agriculture is prominent in Rwanda and approximately 59% of the land is used for agricultural processes.

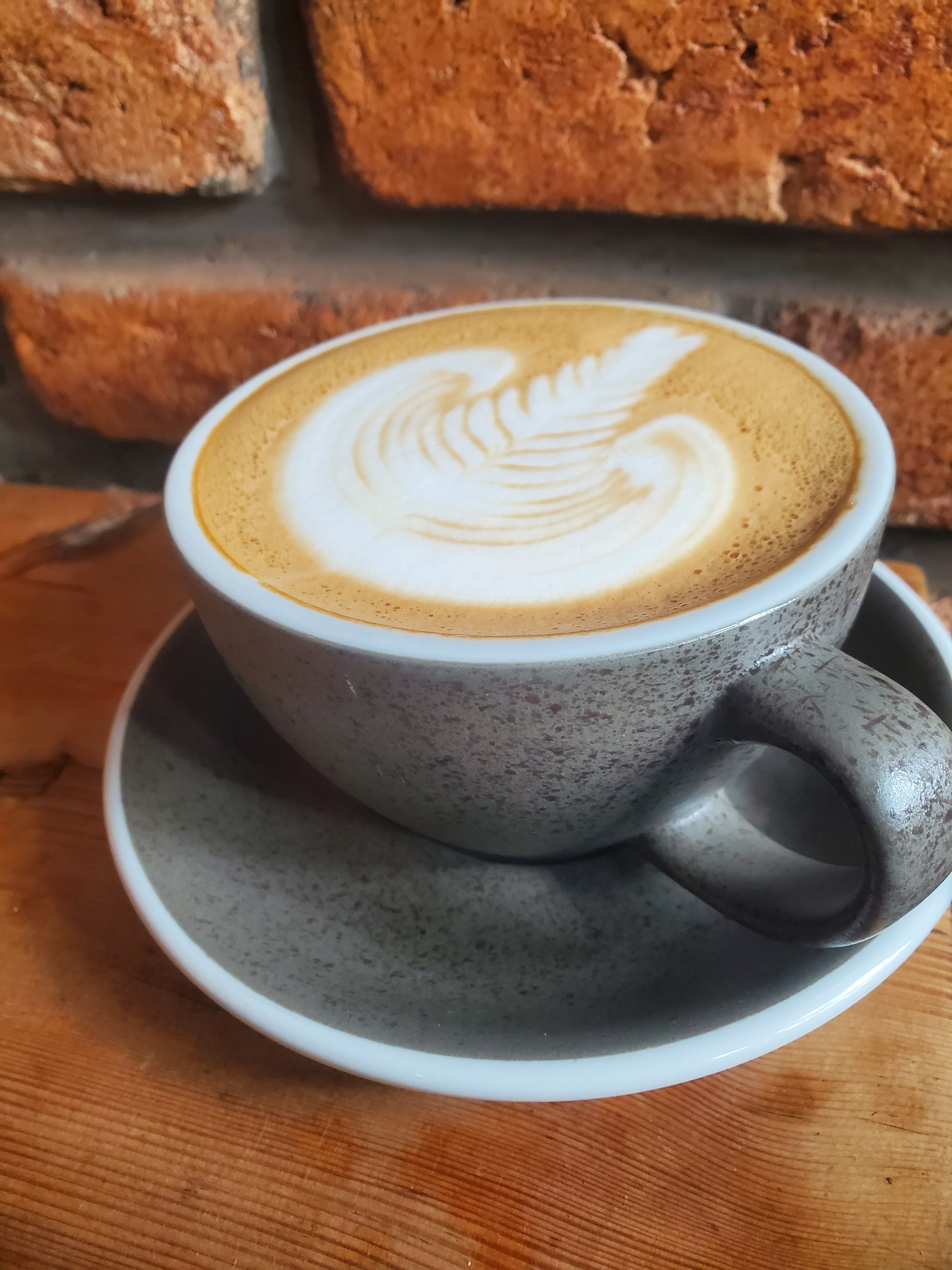
Coffee is Rwanda's largest cash crop due to profitability, although far exceeded in banana production

Crops grown in the country include matoke (green bananas), which occupy more than a third of the country's farmland, potatoes, beans, sweet potatoes, cassava, wheat and maize. Coffee and tea are the major cash crops for export, with the high altitudes, steep slopes and volcanic soils providing favourable conditions. Reports have established that more than 400,000 Rwandans make their living from coffee plantation. Reliance on agricultural exports makes Rwanda vulnerable to shifts in their prices. Animals raised in Rwanda include cows, goats, sheep, pigs, chicken, and rabbits, with geographical variation in the numbers of each. Production systems are mostly traditional, although there are a few intensive dairy farms around Kigali. Shortages of land and water, insufficient and poor-quality feed, and regular disease epidemics with insufficient veterinary services are major constraints that restrict output. Fishing takes place on the country's lakes, but stocks are very depleted, and live fish are being imported in an attempt to revive the industry.

To promote sustainable practices, the government of Rwanda partnered with the Howard G. Buffett Foundation to establish the Rwanda Institute for Conservation Agriculture (RICA) in 2019. Located in Bugesera District, the institution provides hands-on training in conservation agriculture and "One Health" principles.

=== Industry and manufacturing ===
The industrial sector is currently experiencing growth, contributing 21.5% of GDP in 2014. Products manufactured include cement, agricultural products, small-scale beverages, soap, furniture, shoes, plastic goods, textiles and cigarettes. Rwanda's mining industry is an important contributor, generating US$93 million in 2008. Minerals mined include cassiterite, wolframite, gold, and coltan, which is used in the manufacture of electronic and communication devices such as mobile phones.

Rwanda's service sector suffered during the late-2000s recession as bank lending, foreign aid projects and investment were reduced. The sector rebounded in 2010, becoming the country's largest sector by economic output and contributing 43.6% of the country's GDP. Key tertiary contributors include banking and finance, wholesale and retail trade, hotels and restaurants, transport, storage, communication, insurance, real estate, business services and public administration including education and health.

Rwanda was ranked 104th in the Global Innovation Index in 2025.

=== Tourism ===
Tourism is one of Rwanda's fastest-growing economic sectors and remains the country's leading foreign exchange earner. In 2023, Rwanda recorded over 1.4 million international visitors, generating about US$620 million in revenue, according to the Rwanda Development Board (RDB). The World Travel & Tourism Council reported that in 2024, the sector supported nearly 386,000 jobs in Rwanda and contributed over 10% of GDP. The government has explicitly created an agenda for high cost, low traffic luxury tourism, emphasizing high end lodges and experiences within a natural setting. The tourism was greatly impacted by the COVID-19 pandemic, as well as the Ebola outbreak in 2026 in neighboring Uganda and DRC.

A major draw for visitors is mountain gorilla tracking in Volcanoes National Park, one of only three places worldwide where mountain gorillas can be seen in the wild. A single mountain gorilla permits cost US$1,500 for foreigners and are highly restricted to a few number of individuals per day. Other attractions include Nyungwe Forest National Park, known for its chimpanzees and canopy walkway, the resorts of Lake Kivu, and Akagera National Park; a savanna reserve in the east home to elephants, lions, and giraffes.

The government, through the RDB, has promoted tourism as a pillar of economic growth. Visitor numbers have increased steadily since the early 2000s, with international arrivals often linked to conferences in Kigali as well as ecotourism. In 2018, Rwanda launched the Visit Rwanda campaign, including sponsorship deals with European football clubs such as Arsenal F.C., Paris Saint-Germain F.C., and Atlético Madrid, to raise the country's profile as a travel destination.

In 2025, Visit Rwanda expanded its sports marketing into the United States, entering multi-year agreements with the Los Angeles Clippers (NBA) and the Los Angeles Rams (NFL). As part of the Clippers partnership, Visit Rwanda became the exclusive jersey patch sponsor and the official coffee sponsor of the team's Intuit Dome arena. In the Rams deal, Visit Rwanda is an official international tourism sponsor of the team, SoFi Stadium, and Hollywood Park, and will secure prominent advertising and entitlement placements within the stadium complex.

Tourism in Rwanda has been seen as a model for other countries in East Africa, as it focuses on sustainability and conservation. The government has a program in which it directly shares a portion of annual tourism revenues, 5% beginning in 2005, and increasing to 10% in 2017, with the local communities around the park. Despite marketing, there is still debate on whether the sector is improving the conditions locally. In a survey, those working within the tourism industry did not self report the same positive perception of Rwanda as visitors had, particularly on politics and safety. Similarly, a review conducted fifteen years from the deployment of the scheme found about 57% of community members near parks felt satisfied with the scheme, while 20% remained dissatisfied. Vulnerable communities, those not a part of a formal cooperative or not involved in local governance reported lowest levels of satisfaction with the program.

=== Media and communications ===
The largest radio and television stations are state-run, and the majority of newspapers are owned by the government. Most Rwandans have access to radio; during the 1994 genocide, the radio station Radio Télévision Libre des Mille Collines broadcast across the country, and helped to fuel the killings through anti-Tutsi propaganda. As of 2015, the state-run Radio Rwanda was the largest station and the main source of news throughout the country. Television access was limited, with most homes not having their own set. The government rolled out digital television in 2014, and a year later there were seven national stations operating, up from just one in the pre-2014 analogue era. The press is tightly restricted, and newspapers routinely self-censor to avoid government reprisals. Nonetheless, publications in Kinyarwanda, English, and French critical of the government are widely available in Kigali. Restrictions were increased in the run-up to the Rwandan presidential election of 2010, with two independent newspapers, Umuseso and Umuvugizi, being suspended for six months by the High Media Council.

The country's oldest telecommunications group, Rwandatel, went into liquidation in 2011, having been 80% owned by Libyan company LAP Green. The company was acquired in 2013 by Liquid Telecom, a company providing telecommunications and fibre-optic networks across eastern and southern Africa. In 2015, Liquid Telecom provided landline service to 30,968 subscribers, with mobile operator MTN Rwanda serving an additional 15,497 fixed line subscribers. Landlines are mostly used by government institutions, banks, NGOs and embassies, with private subscription levels low. In 2015, mobile phone penetration in the country was 72.6%, up from 41.6% in 2011. MTN Rwanda is the leading provider, with 3,957,986 subscribers, followed by Tigo with 2,887,328, and Bharti Airtel with 1,336,679. Rwandatel has also previously operated a mobile phone network, but the industry regulator revoked its licence in April 2011, following the company's failure to meet agreed investment commitments. Internet penetration is low but rising rapidly; in 2015 there were 12.8 internet users per 100 people, up from 2.1 in 2007. In 2011, a 2,300-kilometre (1,400 mi) fibre-optic telecommunications network was completed, intended to provide broadband services and facilitate electronic commerce. This network is connected to SEACOM, a submarine fibre-optic cable connecting communication carriers in southern and eastern Africa. Within Rwanda the cables run along major roads, linking towns around the country. Mobile provider MTN also runs a wireless internet service accessible in most areas of Kigali via pre-paid subscription. As of 2024, the largest internet providers are MTN and Airtel. MTN Rwanda has shown impressive growth in its subscriber base. As of the first quarter of 2024, MTN Rwanda had approximately 7.4 million mobile subscribers. (Additionally, their Mobile Money platform, MoMo, had around 5.1 million users), compared to Airtel Rwanda's 5,792,046 active mobile-cellular telephone subscriptions. In October 2019, Mara Corporation launched the first African-made smartphone in Rwanda. Following its launch in 2024, Airtel Rwanda, in cooperation with the Rwandan government, released the most affordable smartphone in the world, the Airtel Imagine 4G. The phone was introduced as part of the ConnectRwanda 2.0 initiative. It costs only 20,000 RWF (approximately US$14.49).

=== Infrastructure ===
==== Water supply and sanitation ====
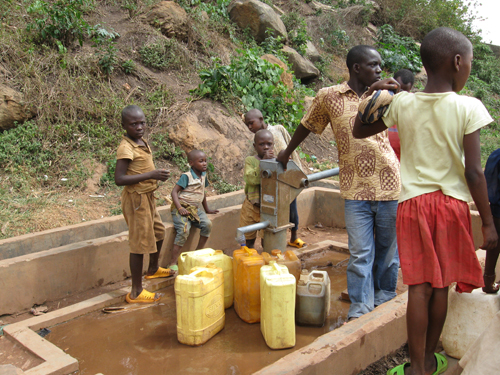
Rural water pump

The Rwandan government prioritised funding of water supply development during the 2000s, significantly increasing its share of the national budget. This funding, along with donor support, caused a rapid increase in access to safe water. In 2015, 74% of the population had access to safe water, up from about 55% in 2005; the government initially set a target to increase this to 100% by 2017.

The country's water infrastructure consists of urban and rural systems that deliver water to the public, mainly through standpipes in rural areas and private connections in urban areas. In areas not served by these systems, hand pumps and managed springs are used. Despite rainfall exceeding 750 millimetres (30 in) annually in most of the country, little use is made of rainwater harvesting, and residents are forced to use water very sparingly relative to usage in other African countries.

Access to sanitation historically lagged behind water access; the United Nations estimated that in 2006, only 34% of urban and 20% of rural dwellers had access to improved sanitation. By 2022, overall access to improved sanitation had increased significantly to 92% of the total population (95% urban and 91% rural). Government policy measures to improve sanitation have traditionally focused heavily on urban areas, and Kigali has been recognized as one of the cleanest cities in Africa. However, a majority of the population across both rural and urban areas continues to rely on public shared pit latrines.

==== Energy ====
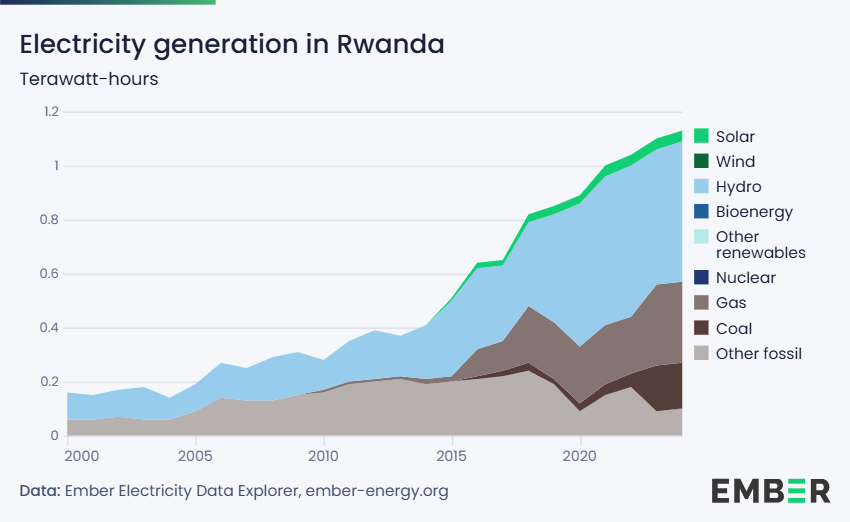
Electricity generation in Rwanda in terawatt-hours

Until the early 2000s, Rwanda's electricity supply was generated almost entirely from hydroelectric sources; power stations on Lakes Burera and Ruhondo provided 90% of the country's electricity. A combination of below-average rainfall and human activity, including the draining of the Rugezi wetlands for cultivation and grazing, caused the two lakes' water levels to fall from 1990 onward; by 2004, levels were reduced by 50%, leading to a sharp drop in output from the power stations. This, coupled with increased demand as the economy grew, precipitated a shortfall in 2004 and widespread loadshedding.

As an emergency measure, the government installed diesel generators north of Kigali; by 2006 these were providing 56% of the country's costly electricity. The government later enacted a number of measures to alleviate this problem, including rehabilitating the Rugezi wetlands and investing in a scheme to extract methane gas from Lake Kivu to increase power generation. Only 18% of the population had access to electricity in 2012, though this had risen from 10.8% in 2009. The government's Economic Development and Poverty Reduction Strategy for 2013–18 aimed to scale up infrastructure to bring household electricity access to 70% by 2017.

==== Transport ====
The government has increased investment in the transport infrastructure of Rwanda since the 1994 genocide, with aid from the United States, European Union, Japan, and other international donors. The transport system consists primarily of a road network, featuring paved roads connecting Kigali to most other major cities and towns. Rwanda is linked by road to neighbor nations in the East African Community—namely Uganda, Tanzania, Burundi, and Kenya—as well as to the eastern Congolese cities of Goma and Bukavu. The country's most critical trade corridor is the road to the port of Mombasa via Kampala and Nairobi, known as the Northern Corridor.

The principal form of domestic public transport is the minibus, accounting for more than half of all passenger-carrying capacity. Some minibuses, particularly within Kigali, operate unscheduled services under a shared taxi system, while others run on fixed schedules offering express routes between major cities. A smaller number of larger buses operate scheduled routes nationwide. For private hire, the dominant vehicle is the motorcycle taxi; in 2013, there were 9,609 registered motorcycle taxis in Rwanda, compared with just 579 standard taxicabs. Long-distance coach services are also available to destinations in neighboring countries.

Aviation is centered at Kigali International Airport, which serves several international destinations; the busiest routes are those to Nairobi and Entebbe. A single domestic route connects Kigali to Kamembe Airport near Cyangugu. In 2017, construction began on the Bugesera International Airport south of Kigali, designed to become the country's largest facility upon completion to complement the existing infrastructure. The national carrier is RwandAir, and the country is additionally served by several foreign airlines.

As of the mid-2010s, the country had no operational railways, though a project was initiated in conjunction with Burundi and Tanzania to extend the Tanzanian Central Line into Rwanda via a public private partnership. There is no public water transport network across the port cities on Lake Kivu, although a limited private service exists and the government has initiated a development programme for full commercial service. The Ministry of Infrastructure has also investigated the feasibility of linking Rwanda to Lake Victoria via shipping lanes on the Akagera River.

=== Macroeconomics ===
Monetary policy and management of government finances is controlled by the central National Bank of Rwanda (BNR). The currency used is the Rwandan franc, created in 1964. In August 2025, the exchange rate was 1445 francs to one US dollar. Rwanda joined the East African Community in 2007, and has ratified a plan for monetary union amongst the seven member nations, with an earlier policy goal of creating a unified East African shilling.

==== Financial services ====
The financial sector in Rwanda is the third-largest contributor to the service sector and is supervised by the BNR. As of March 2025, the sector's total assets stood at FRW 13.6 trillion (approx. US$9.4 billion), representing a year-on-year growth of 23.2%.

Rwanda has achieved near-universal financial inclusion, largely driven by mobile technology. According to the 2024 FinScope survey, 96% of the adult population is financially included, with the majority relying on non-bank mobile financial services.

Mobile money platforms, operated primarily by MTN Rwanda and Airtel Rwanda, have effectively replaced cash for daily economic activity. In 2024, the total value of mobile money transactions reached Rwf 21.0 trillion, exceeding the country's nominal GDP (Rwf 18.8 trillion). This high monetary velocity is supported by the government's "Cashless Rwanda" policy and the "eKash" interoperability system, which allows seamless transfers between rival telecom operators and commercial banks.

==== Capital markets ====
The Rwanda Stock Exchange (RSE) is the principal stock exchange with a market capitalization of approximately FRW 4.6 trillion (US$3.1 billion) as of December 2025. In 2024, the market expanded into sustainable finance with the listing the first green bonds and environmental-outcome linked bonds. Parallel to equities, the East Africa Exchange (EAX) is a regional agricultural commodities exchange based in Kigali, which operates a warehouse receipt system for stored agricultural commodities, including the use of electronic warehouse receipts in commodity trading.

The sector is anchored by the Kigali International Financial Centre (KIFC), a government initiative launched in 2020 to position Rwanda as a pan-African financial hub. Managed by Rwanda Finance Limited, KIFC provides a legal and tax framework designed to attract investment funds, family offices, and fintech ventures.

== Demographics ==
As of 2025, Rwanda's estimated population is around 14.6 million, although estimates vary. A decade earlier, in 2015, the estimated population was 11,262,564 (according to the National Institute of Statistics of Rwanda), and the 2012 census recorded a population of 10,515,973. The population is young: as of 2024–2025, estimates of the median age ranged from 19.9 to 20.8, with 42.9% of the population under the age of 15, and 54.7% between 15 and 64. In 2015, according to the CIA World Factbook, the annual birth rate was estimated at 40.2 births per 1,000 inhabitants, and the death rate at 14.9. The current life expectancy is between 68.2 and 70.54 years (71 years for females and 66 years for males), placing it 156th out of 224 countries and territories. The overall sex ratio of the country is 95.9 males per 100 females.

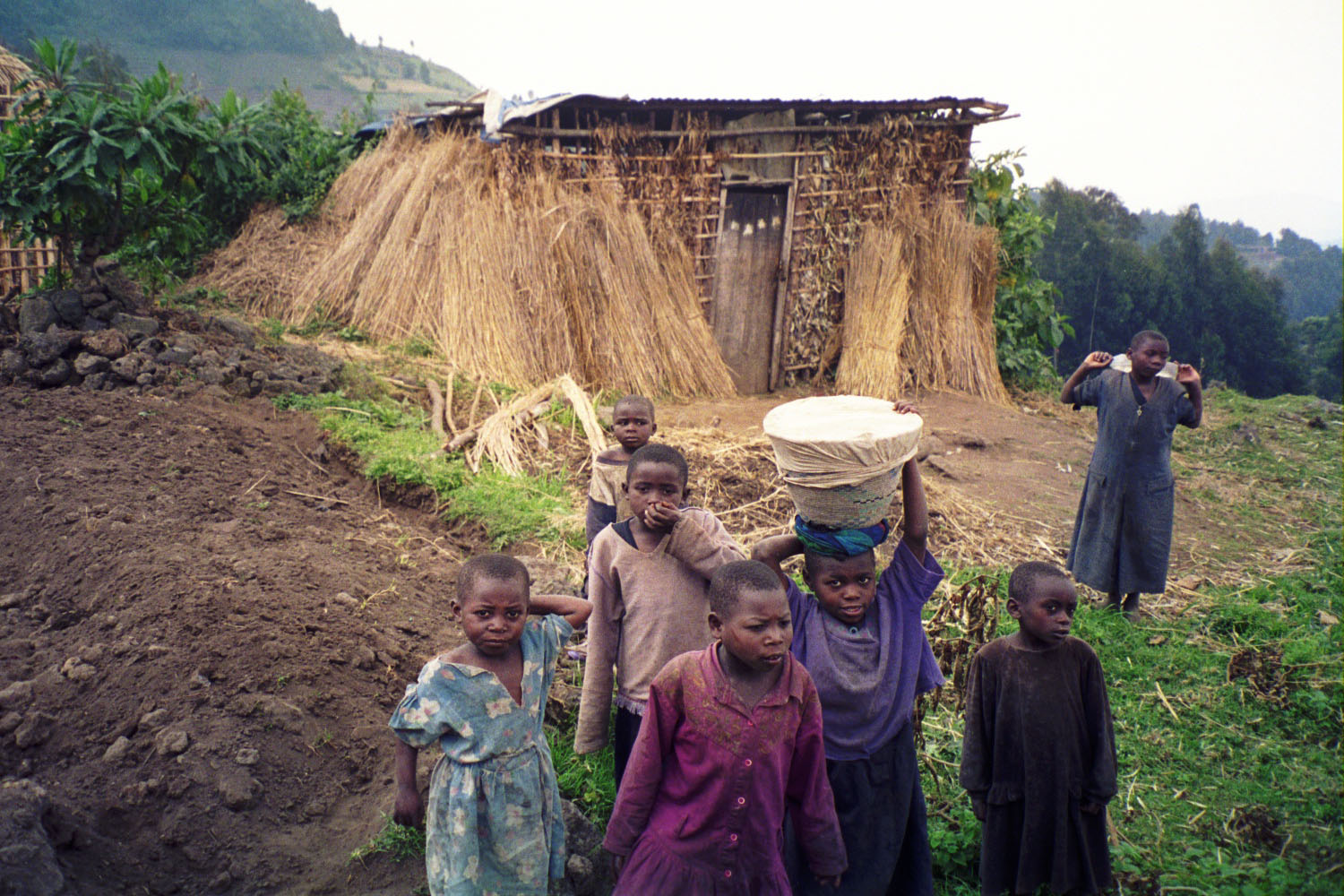
Rural children

At 445 inhabitants per square kilometre (1,150/sq mi), Rwanda's population density is amongst the highest in Africa. Historians such as Gérard Prunier believe that the 1994 genocide can be partly attributed to the population density. The population is predominantly rural, with a few large towns; dwellings are evenly spread throughout the country. The only sparsely populated area of the country is the savanna land in the former province of Umutara and Akagera National Park in the east. Kigali is the largest city, with a population of around one million. Its rapidly increasing population challenges its infrastructural development. According to the 2012 census, the second largest city is Gisenyi, which lies adjacent to Lake Kivu and the Congolese city of Goma, and has a population of 126,000. Other major towns include Ruhengeri, Butare, and Muhanga, all with populations below 100,000. The urban population rose from 6% of the population in 1990, to 16.6% in 2006; by 2011, however, the proportion had dropped slightly, to 14.8%.

Rwanda has been a unified state since pre-colonial times, and the population is drawn from just one cultural and linguistic group, the Banyarwanda; this contrasts with most modern African states, whose borders were drawn by colonial powers and did not correspond to ethnic boundaries or pre-colonial kingdoms. Within the Banyarwanda people, there are three separate groups, the Hutu, Tutsi and Twa. The CIA World Factbook gives estimates that the Hutu made up 84% of the population in 2009, the Tutsi 15% and Twa 1%. The Twa are a pygmy people who descend from Rwanda's earliest inhabitants, but scholars do not agree on the origins of and differences between the Hutu and Tutsi. Anthropologist Jean Hiernaux contends that the Tutsi are a separate race, with a tendency towards "long and narrow heads, faces and noses"; others, such as Villia Jefremovas, believe there is no discernible physical difference and the categories were not historically rigid. In precolonial Rwanda the Tutsi were the ruling class, from whom the kings and the majority of chiefs were derived, while the Hutu were agriculturalists. The current government discourages the Hutu/Tutsi/Twa distinction, and has removed such classification from identity cards. The 2002 census was the first since 1933 which did not categorise Rwandan population into the three groups.

Largest cities or towns in Rwanda Source:
| Rank | Name | Province | Pop. |
|---|---|---|---|
| 1 | Kigali | Kigali | 1,745,555 |
| 2 | Rubavu | Western | 294,448 |
| 3 | Musanze | Northern | 234,258 |
| 4 | Bugesera | Eastern | 221,227 |
| 5 | Rwamagana | Eastern | 180,056 |
| 6 | Rusizi | Western | 162,165 |
| 7 | Nyagatare | Eastern | 157,894 |
| 8 | Kamonyi | Southern | 142,520 |
| 9 | Muhanga | Southern | 87,252 |
| 10 | Huye | Southern | 79,744 |

=== Education ===
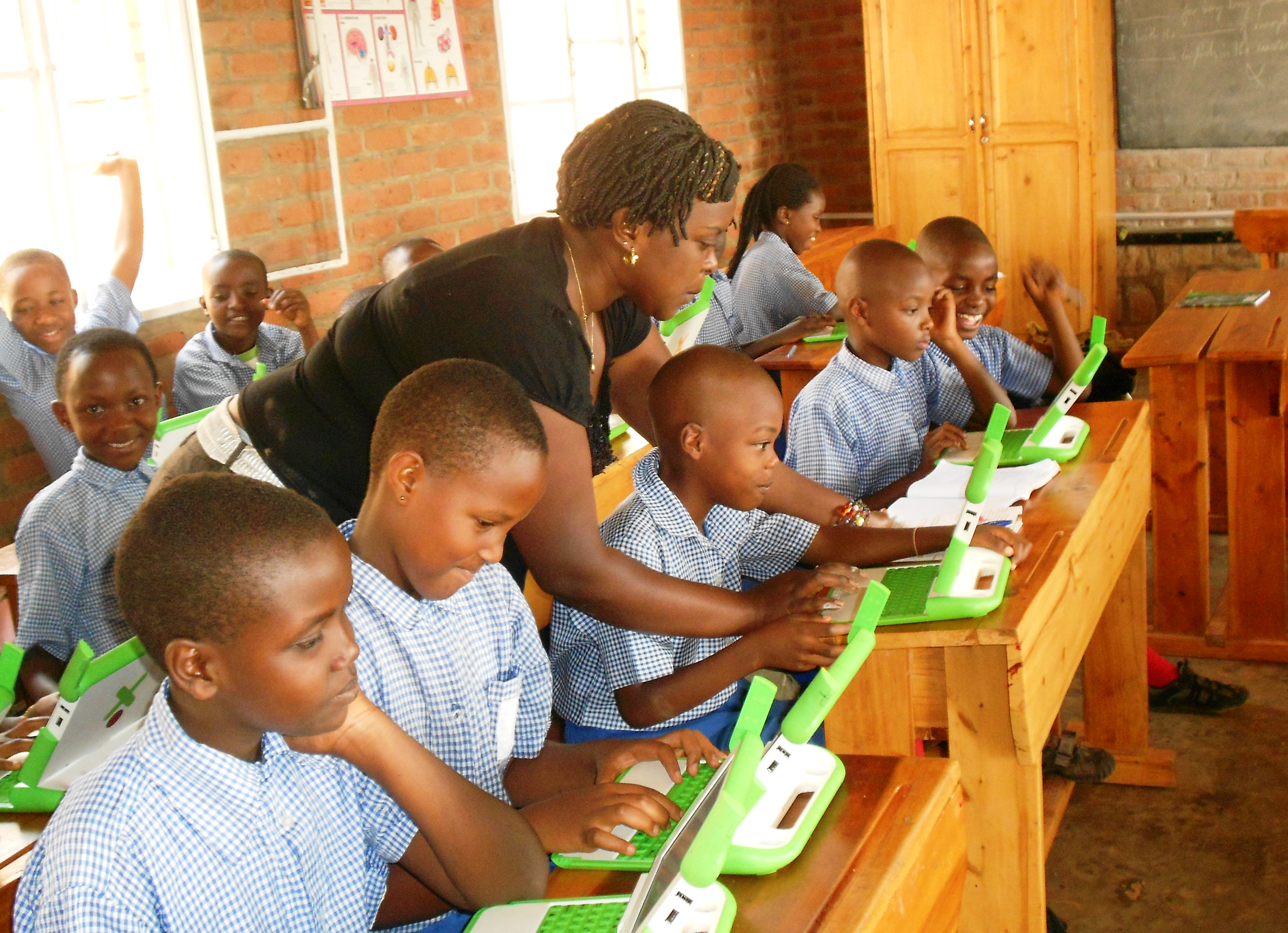
Children in a Rwandan primary school, using laptops supplied by the One Laptop Per Child programme

Prior to 2012, the Rwandan government provided nine years of free basic education in state-run schools, consisting of six years of primary and three years of lower secondary education (known as the Tronc Commun). In 2012, this policy was expanded to cover twelve years of free basic education, including upper secondary.

A 2015 study noted that while primary school enrollment was nearly universal, completion rates remained low and repetition rates high. Although schooling is officially fee free, parents are expected to contribute to certain costs such as school materials, teacher support, and infrastructure maintenance. The government maintains that these contributions should not prevent any child from attending school.

There are also many private and church affiliated schools that follow the national curriculum but charge tuition fees. From 1994 until 2009, secondary education was offered in either French or English. Following Rwanda's accession to the East African Community and the Commonwealth, English became the main medium of instruction from 2009 onward.

The country has several institutions of higher learning. In 2013, the government established the University of Rwanda (UR) through the merger of the National University of Rwanda and other public higher education institutions. In 2023, the gross enrollment ratio for tertiary education was 8.89%, up from 3.6% in 2006. Rwanda's adult literacy rate, defined as the share of those aged 15 and above who can read and write, rose from 38% in 1978 to 58% in 1991, 71% in 2009, and 78.8% in 2022.

=== Health ===
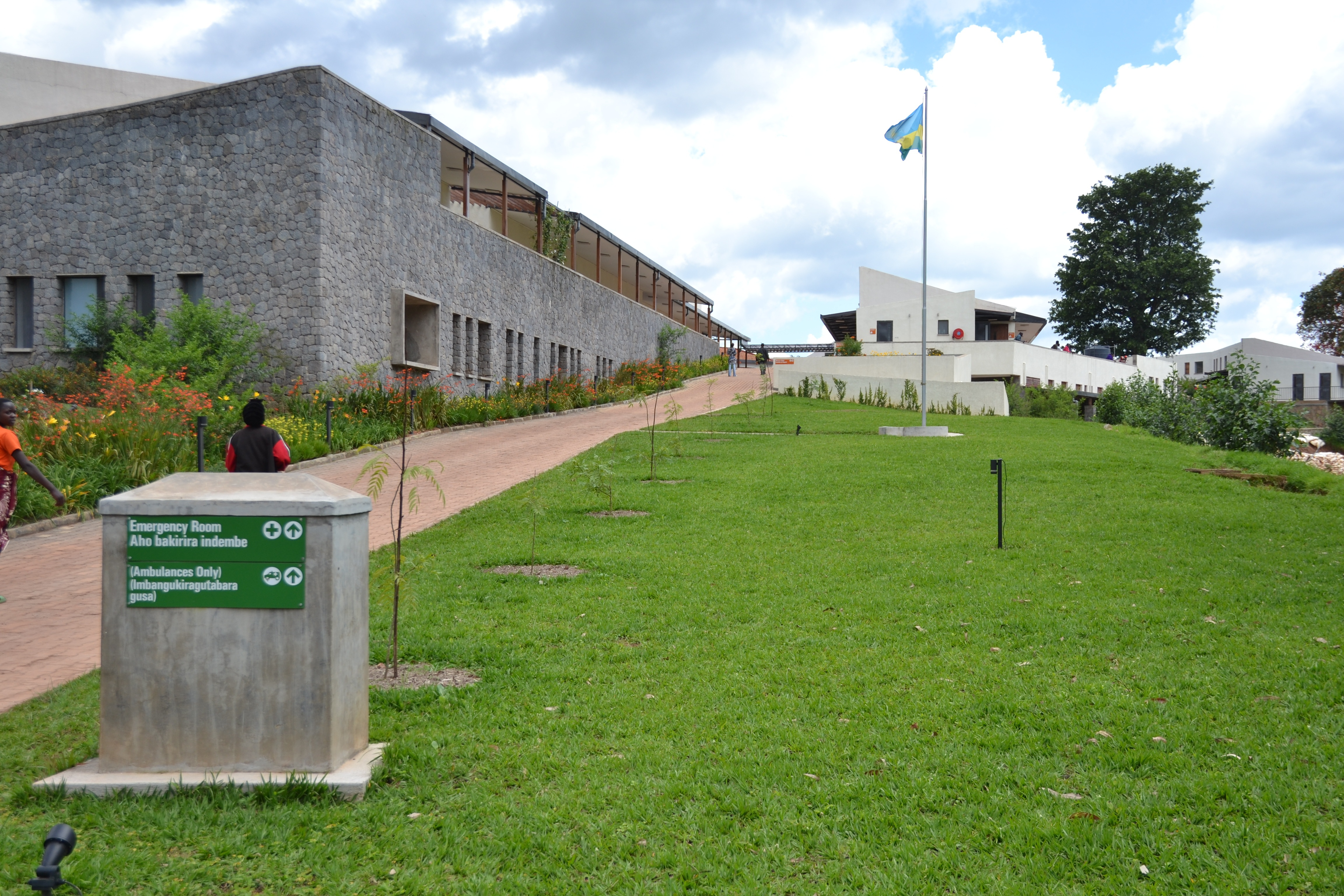
Butaro Hospital at Burera, Northern Province

The quality of healthcare in Rwanda has historically been very low, both before and immediately after the 1994 genocide. In 1998, more than one in five children died before their fifth birthday, often from malaria.

President Kagame has made healthcare one of the priorities for the Vision 2020 development programme, boosting spending on health care to 6.5% of the country's gross domestic product in 2013, compared with 1.9% in 1996. The government has devolved the financing and management of healthcare to local communities, through a system of health insurance providers called mutuelles de santé. The mutuelles were piloted in 1999, and were made available nationwide by the mid-2000s, with the assistance of international development partners. Premiums under the scheme were initially US$2 per annum; since 2011 the rate has varied on a sliding scale, with the poorest paying nothing, and maximum premiums rising to US$8 per adult. As of 2014, more than 90% of the population was covered by the scheme. The government has also set up training institutes including the Kigali Health Institute (KHI), which was established in 1997 and is now part of the University of Rwanda. In 2005, President Kagame also launched a programme known as The Presidents' Malaria Initiative. This initiative aimed to help get the most necessary materials for prevention of malaria to the most rural areas of Rwanda, such as mosquito nets and medication.

Historical development of life expectancy in Rwanda, showing an extremely sharp drop in 1994.

In recent years Rwanda has seen improvement on a number of key health indicators. Between 2005 and 2013, life expectancy increased from 55.2 to 64.0, under-5 mortality decreased from 106.4 to 52.0 per 1,000 live births, and incidence of tuberculosis has dropped from 101 to 69 per 100,000 people. The country's progress in healthcare has been cited by the international media and charities. The Atlantic devoted an article to "Rwanda's Historic Health Recovery". Partners In Health described the health gains "among the most dramatic the world has seen in the last 50 years".

Despite these improvements, however, the country's health profile remains dominated by communicable diseases, and the United States Agency for International Development has described "significant health challenges", including the rate of maternal mortality, which it describes as "unacceptably high", as well as the ongoing HIV/AIDS epidemic. According to the American Centers for Disease Control and Prevention, travellers to Rwanda are highly recommended to take preventive malaria medication as well as make sure they are up to date with vaccines such as yellow fever.

Rwanda also has a shortage of medical professionals, with only 0.84 physicians, nurses, and midwives per 1,000 residents. The United Nations Development Programme (UNDP) is monitoring the country's health progress towards Millennium Development Goals 4–6, which relate to healthcare. A mid-2015 UNDP report noted that the country was not on target to meet goal 4 on infant mortality, despite it having "fallen dramatically"; the country is "making good progress" towards goal 5, which is to reduce by three quarters the maternal mortality ratio, while goal 6 is not yet met as HIV prevalence has not started falling.

=== Religion ===
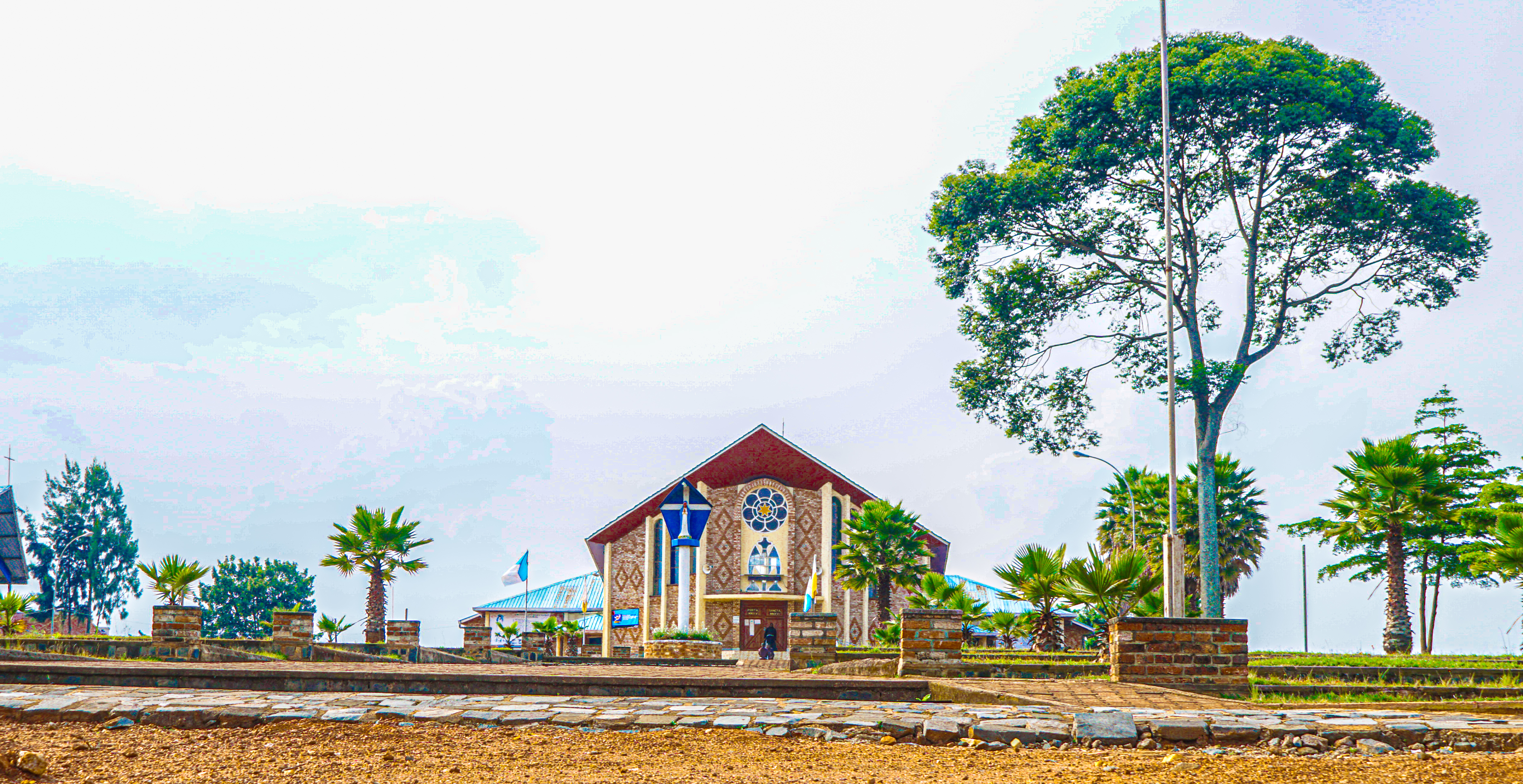
Catholic shrine of Our Lady of Kibeho

The largest faith in Rwanda is Catholicism, but there have been significant changes in the nation's religious demographics since the genocide, with many conversions to evangelical Christianity, and, to a lesser degree, Islam. According to the 2012 census, Catholic Christians represented 43.7% of the population, Protestants (excluding Seventh-day Adventists) 37.7%, Seventh-day Adventists 11.8%, and Muslims 2.0%; 0.2% claimed no religious beliefs and 1.3% did not state a religion. Traditional religion, despite officially being followed by only 0.1% of the population, retains an influence. Many Rwandans view the Christian God as synonymous with the traditional Rwandan God Imana.

=== Languages ===
The country's principal and national language is Kinyarwanda, which is spoken by almost the entire population (about 98%). The inhabitants of the islands on Lake Kivu, including the island of Nkombo and the coastal areas of the western province of Rwanda, speak Mashi, a Congolese language widely spoken in the Democratic Republic of Congo. This is due to the ancient belonging of these territories to the former Kingdom of Bushi.

During the colonial era, German was the first European language introduced to Rwanda, though it was never widely used or taught. After 1916, French became dominant under Belgian administration and was used in government and education. The 1962 Constitution made French an official language alongside Kinyarwanda. Dutch was also used in limited administrative contexts during the Belgian period.

The return of English-speaking Rwandan refugees from Uganda, Kenya, and Tanzania in the 1990s reshaped the country's linguistic landscape and accelerated the shift toward English. As Rwanda deepened its ties with the East African Community and joined the Commonwealth, English became increasingly important in education, business, and administration. In 2008, the government changed the medium of instruction in schools from French to English to strengthen regional integration. Since then, the starting point of English instruction in schools has been adjusted several times. While the national curriculum is in English, private schools offering international curricula may still opt to teach in French.

As a member of the Commonwealth of Nations, Rwanda officially adheres to Commonwealth English (British English) conventions in education and government administration; however, the variety used locally is sometimes referred to as Rwandan English and is described as an African English variety shaped by Rwanda's multilingual environment, particularly contact with Kinyarwanda. However, there is no expert linguistic consensus on whether a variety distinct and consistent enough to be labelled 'Rwandan English' yet exists.

Today, Kinyarwanda, English, French, and Swahili are all official languages. Kinyarwanda serves as the national and unifying language, while English is now the primary language of government, education, and business. French remains in limited use in diplomacy and cultural contexts, and Swahili, the lingua franca of the East African Community, is taught in schools and used in regional trade. Swahili was introduced as a compulsory subject in secondary schools in 2015.

According to the 2012 Census of Rwanda, literacy among residents aged 15 and above was 67.7% in Kinyarwanda, 14.7% in English, and 11.4% in French. A decade later, the 2022 Census showed notable shifts: literacy in Kinyarwanda had risen to 78.3%, English to 21.2%, French had decreased to 8.2%, and Swahili reached 4.0%. These results reflect the steady growth of English and Swahili literacy and a continuing decline in the proportion of French-literate speakers. Kinyarwanda remains the mother tongue of nearly all Rwandans, while English and Swahili use continue to expand, particularly in urban areas and schools. As in many postcolonial societies, proficiency in European languages is closely linked to education, migration background, and social class.

=== Human rights ===
Homosexuality is generally considered a taboo topic, and there is no significant public discussion of this issue in any region of the country. Some lesbian, gay, bisexual and transgender (LGBT) Rwandans have reported being harassed and blackmailed. Same-sex sexual activity is not specifically illegal in Rwanda. Some cabinet-level government officials have expressed support for the rights of LGBT people; however, no special legislative protections are afforded to LGBT people, who may be arrested by the police under various laws dealing with public order and morality. Same-sex marriages are not recognized by the state, as the constitution provides that "[o]nly civil monogamous marriage between a man and a woman is recognized".

Since 2006, Human Rights Watch has documented that Rwandan authorities round up and detain street children, street vendors, sex workers, homeless people, and beggars. They have also documented the use of torture in safe houses and other facilities, such as Kami military camp, Kwa Gacinya and Gikondo prison.

== Culture ==
The culture of Rwanda is varied. Unlike many other countries in Africa, Rwanda has been a unified state since precolonial times, populated by the Banyarwanda people who share a single language and cultural heritage.

=== Arts ===
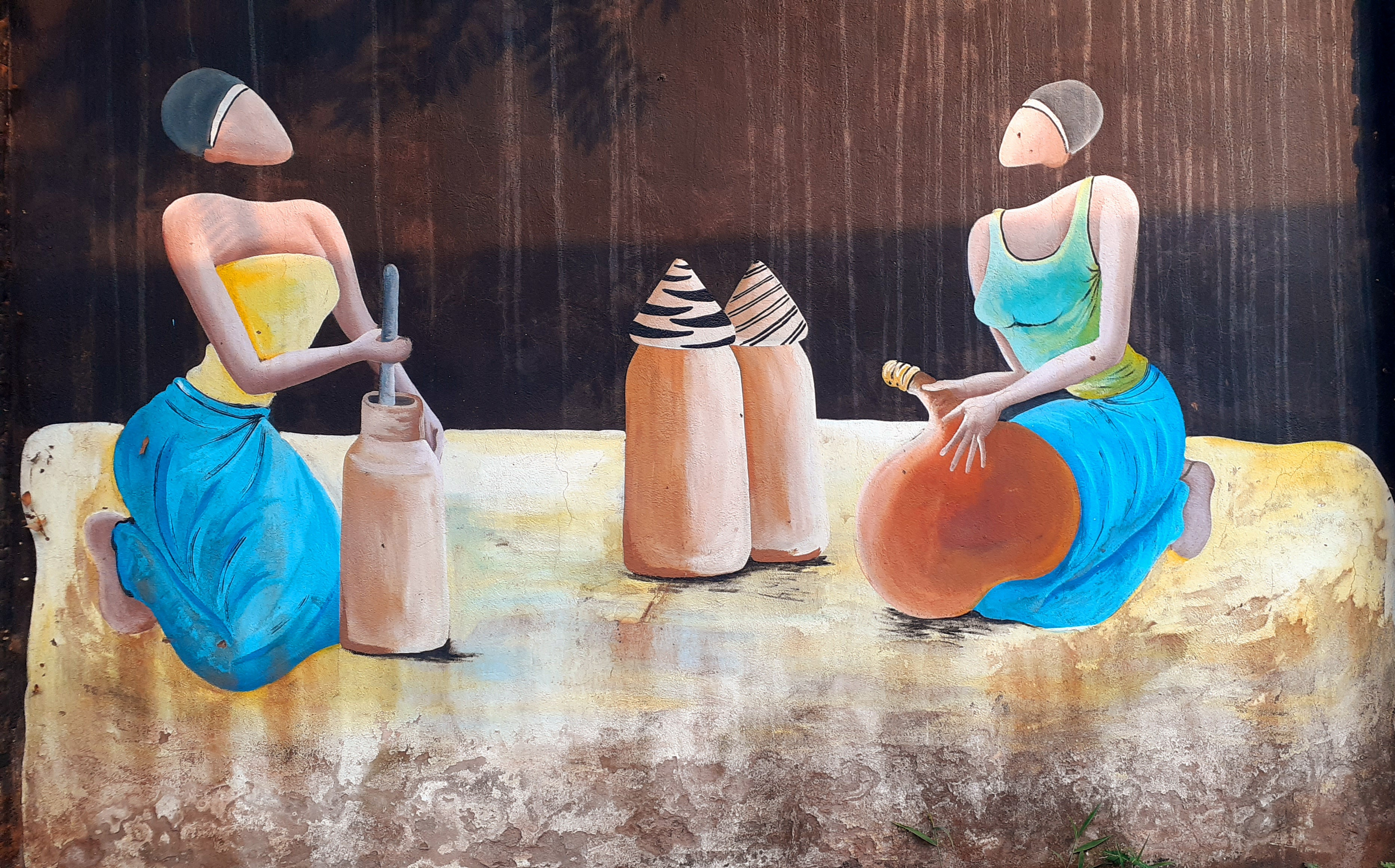
Visual art depicting traditional milk churning

Music and dance are an integral part of Rwandan ceremonies, festivals, social gatherings and storytelling. The most famous traditional dance is a highly choreographed routine consisting of three components: the umushagiriro, or cow dance, performed by women; the intore, or dance of heroes, performed by men; and the drumming, also traditionally performed by men, on drums known as ingoma. The best-known dance group is the National Ballet. It was established by President Habyarimana in 1974, and performs nationally and internationally. Traditionally, music is transmitted orally, with styles varying between the social groups. Drums are of great importance; the royal drummers enjoyed high status within the court of the King (Mwami). Drummers play together in groups of varying sizes, usually between seven and nine in number. The country has a growing popular music industry, influenced by East African, Congolese, and American music. The most popular genre is hip hop, with a blend of dancehall, rap, ragga, R&B and dance-pop.

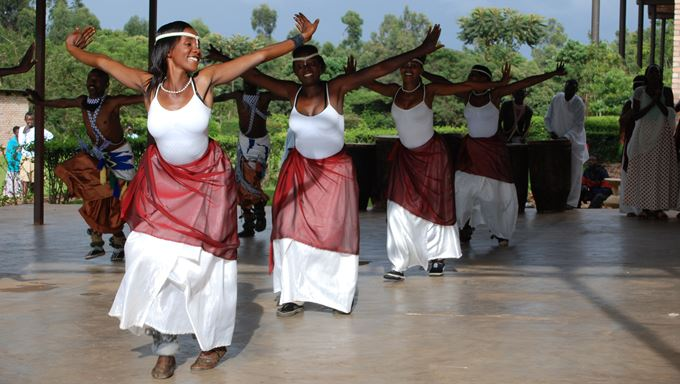
Dance is an integral aspect of the Rwandan culture

Traditional arts and crafts are produced throughout the country, although most originated as functional items rather than purely for decoration. Woven baskets and bowls are especially common, notably the basket style of the agaseke. Imigongo, a unique cow dung art, is produced in the southeast of Rwanda, with a history dating back to when the region was part of the independent Gisaka kingdom. The dung is mixed with natural soils of various colours and painted into patterned ridges to form geometric shapes. Other crafts include pottery and wood carving. Traditional housing styles make use of locally available materials; circular or rectangular mud homes with grass-thatched roofs (known as nyakatsi) are the most common. The government has initiated a programme to replace these with more modern materials such as corrugated iron.

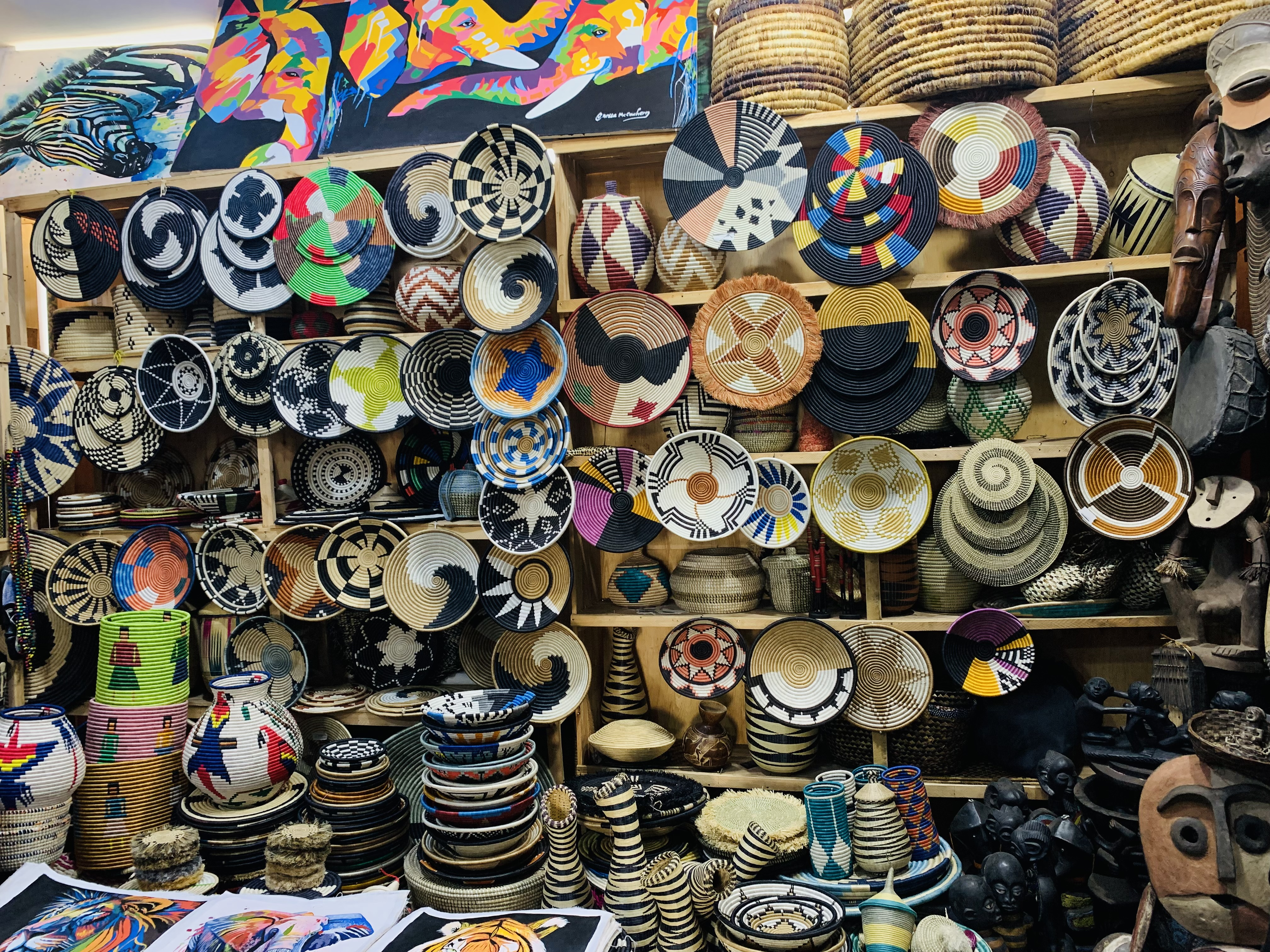
Collection of different types of woven baskets

Rwanda does not have a long history of written literature, but there is a strong oral tradition ranging from poetry to folk stories. Many of the country's moral values and details of history have been passed down through the generations. The most famous Rwandan literary figure was Alexis Kagame (1912–1981), who carried out and published research into oral traditions as well as writing his own poetry. The Rwandan Genocide resulted in the emergence of a literature of witness accounts, essays and fiction by a new generation of writers such as Benjamin Sehene and Mfuranzima Fred. A number of films have been produced about the Rwandan Genocide, including the Golden Globe-nominated Hotel Rwanda, 100 Days, Shake Hands with the Devil, Sometimes in April, and Shooting Dogs, the last four having been filmed in Rwanda and having featured survivors as cast members.

Fourteen regular national holidays are observed throughout the year, with others occasionally inserted by the government. The week following Genocide Memorial Day on 7 April is designated an official week of mourning. The victory for the RPF over the Hutu extremists is celebrated as Liberation Day on 4 July. The last Saturday of each month is umuganda, a national morning of mandatory community service lasting from 8 am to 11 am, during which all able bodied people between 18 and 65 are expected to carry out community tasks such as cleaning streets or building homes for vulnerable people. Most normal services close down during umuganda, and public transportation is limited.

=== Cuisine ===
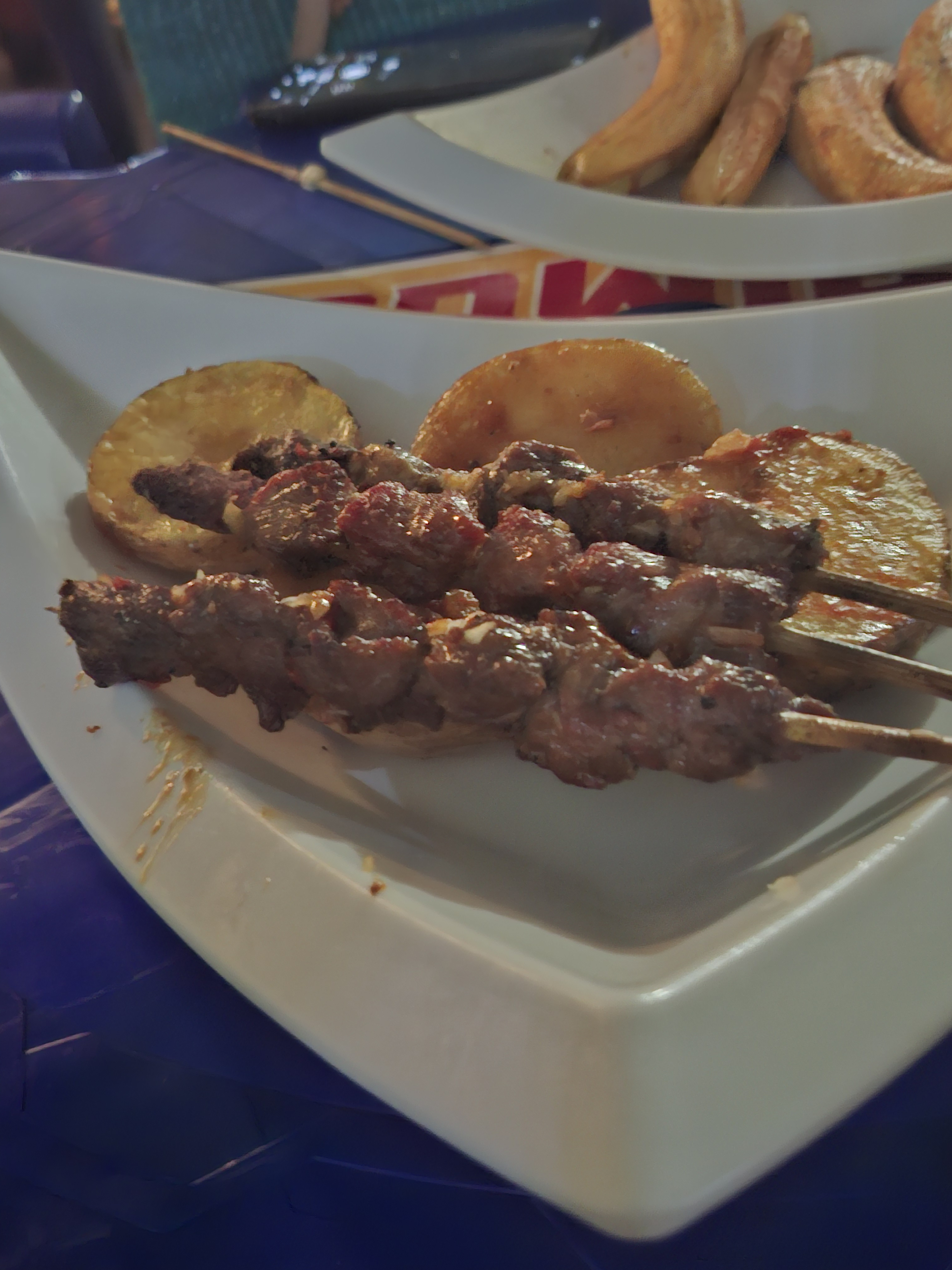
Brochettes, meat on a stick

Rwanda's cuisine consists of staple foods largely produced by subsistence agriculture (e.g. plantains, pulses, sweet potatoes, cassava) and reflects other East African foods (e.g. mandazi, chapati). For those who live near lakes and have access to fish, tilapia is popular. The potato, thought to have been introduced to Rwanda by German and Belgian colonialists, is very popular. Ugali, locally known as Ubugari (or umutsima) is common, a paste made from cassava or maize and water to form a porridge-like consistency that is eaten throughout East Africa and across sub-Saharan Africa. Isombe is made from mashed cassava leaves and can be served with dried fish, rice, ugali, potatoes etc. Lunch is usually a buffet known as mélange, consisting of the above staples and sometimes meat.

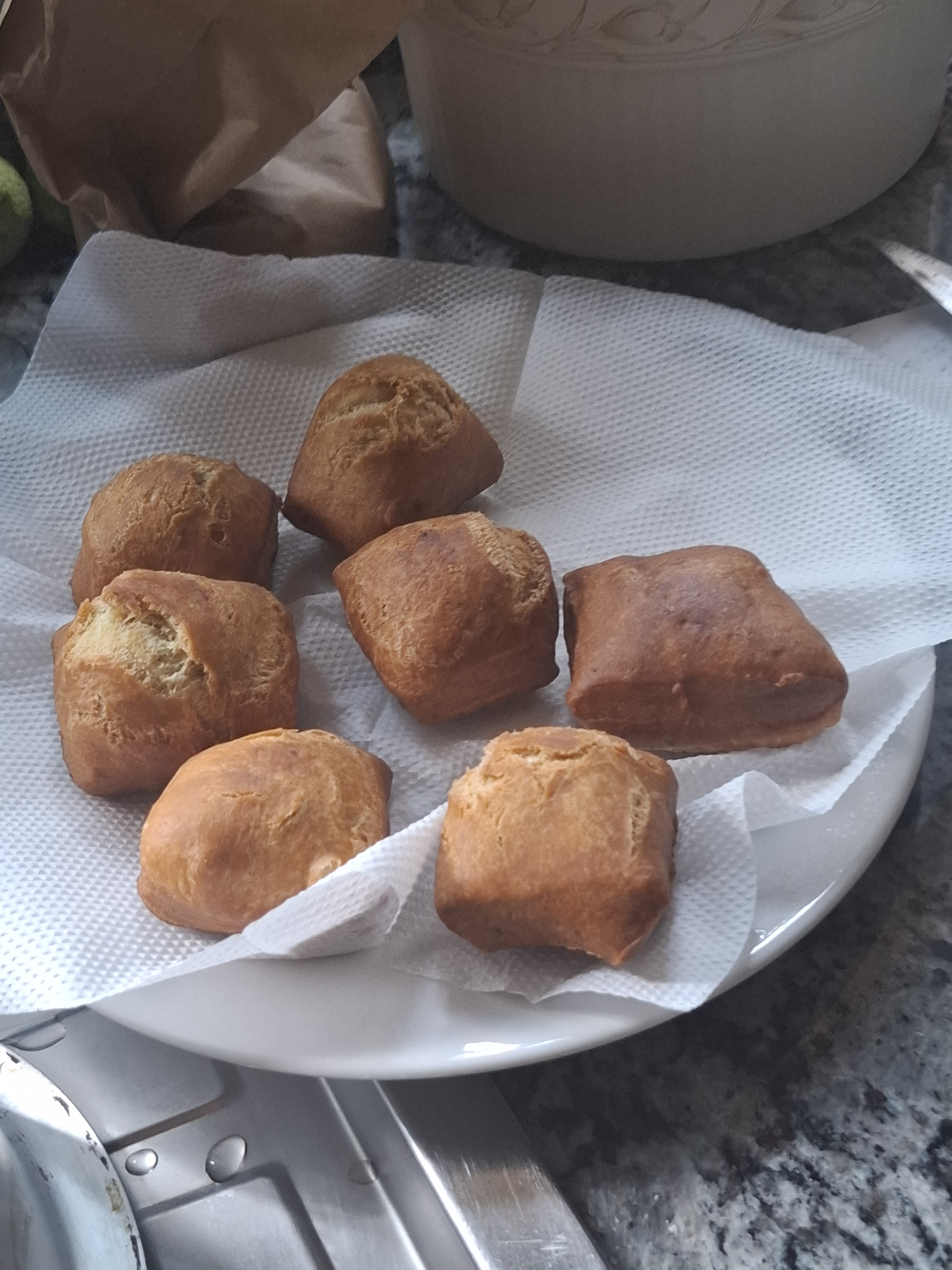
Shortcake Mandazi (originated in neighbouring Tanzania)

Brochettes are the most popular food when eating out in the evening, usually made from goat but sometimes tripe, beef, or fish. In rural areas, many bars have a brochette seller responsible for tending and slaughtering the goats, skewering and barbecuing the meat, and serving it with grilled bananas.

However, many children in Rwanda are malnourished (1/3 for children under five).

Milk, particularly in a fermented yoghurt form called ikivuguto, is a common drink throughout the country. Other drinks include a traditional beer called ikigage, made from sorghum, and urwagwa, made from bananas, and a soft drink called umutobe which consists of banana juice; these popular drinks feature in traditional rituals and ceremonies.

The major drinks manufacturer in Rwanda is Bralirwa, which was established in the 1950s, a Heineken partner, and is now listed on the Rwandan Stock Exchange. Bralirwa manufactures soft drink products from The Coca-Cola Company, under licence, including Coca-Cola, Fanta, and Sprite, and a range of beers including Primus, Mützig, Amstel, and Turbo King. In 2009 a new brewery, Brasseries des Mille Collines (BMC) opened, manufacturing Skol beer and a local version known as Skol Gatanu; BMC is now owned by Belgian company Unibra. East African Breweries also operate in the country, importing Guinness, Tusker, and Bell, as well as whisky and spirits.

=== Sport ===
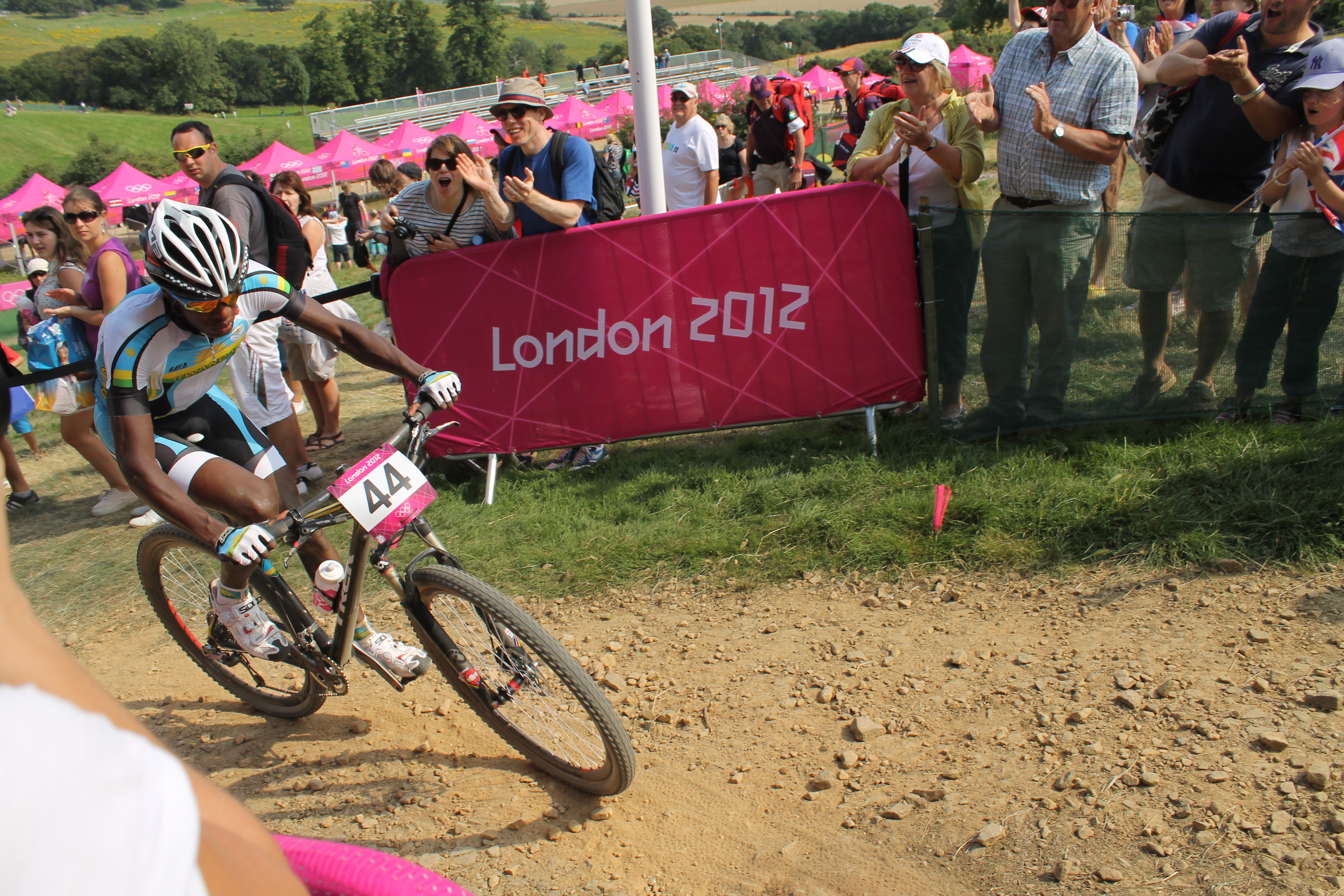
Adrien Niyonshuti, "one of the most famous people in Rwanda", competing in the cross-country mountain biking event at the 2012 Summer Olympics

The Rwandan government, through its Sports Development Policy, promotes sport as a strong avenue for "development and peace building", and the government has made commitments to advancing the use of sport for a variety of development objectives, including education. The most popular sports in Rwanda are association football, volleyball, basketball, athletics and Paralympic sports. Cricket has been growing in popularity, as a result of refugees returned from Kenya, where they had learned to play the game.

Cycling, traditionally seen largely as a mode of transport in Rwanda, is also growing in popularity as a sport; and Team Rwanda have been the subject of a book, Land of Second Chances: The Impossible Rise of Rwanda's Cycling Team and a film, Rising from Ashes. The UCI Road World Championships took place in Kigali in September 2025.

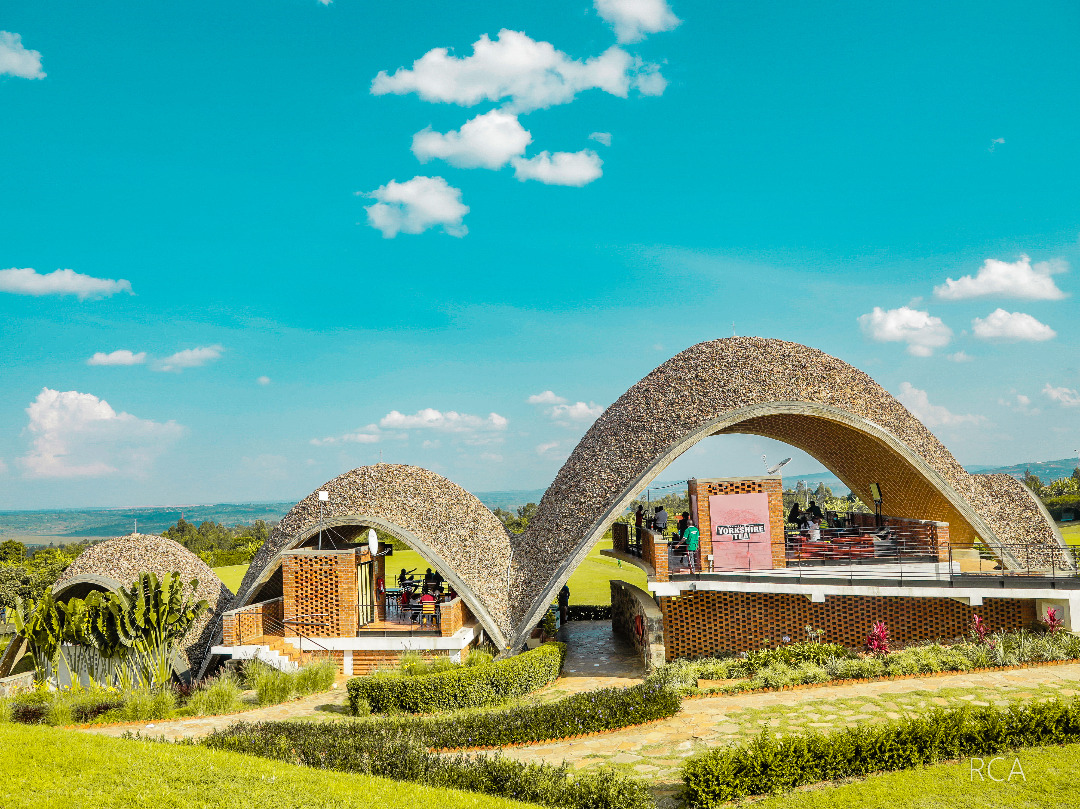
The Gahanga Cricket Stadium

Rwandans have been competing at the Olympic Games since 1984, and the Paralympic Games since 2004. The country sent seven competitors to the 2012 Summer Olympics in London, representing it in athletics, swimming, mountain biking and judo, and 15 competitors to the London Summer Paralympics to compete in athletics, powerlifting and sitting volleyball. The country has also participated in the Commonwealth Games since joining the Commonwealth in 2009. The country's national basketball team has been growing in prominence since the mid-2000s, with the men's team qualifying for the final stages of the African Basketball Championship four times in a row since 2007. The country bid unsuccessfully to host the 2013 tournament. Rwanda's national football team has appeared in the African Cup of Nations once, in the 2004 edition of the tournament, but narrowly failed to advance beyond the group stages. The team have failed to qualify for the competition since, and have never qualified for the World Cup. Rwanda's highest domestic football competition is the Rwanda National Football League; as of 2015, the dominant team is APR FC of Kigali, having won 13 of the last 17 championships. Rwandan clubs participate in the Kagame Interclub Cup for Central and East African teams, sponsored since 2002 by President Kagame.

== See also ==
- Outline of Rwanda

== General and cited references ==
- Adekunle, Julius (2007). Culture and customs of Rwanda. Westport, Conn.: Greenwood Press. ISBN 978-0-313-33177-0.
- African Development Bank (AfDB) (26 August 2011). "Boosting Rwanda's Energy Sector: AfDB, other Lenders Commit USD 91.25 million to Kivuwatt Project". Archived from the original on 5 January 2013.
- African Development Bank (AfDB); Organisation for Economic Co-operation and Development (OECD) Development Centre (2006). African Economic Outlook (5 ed.). Paris: OECD Publishing. ISBN 978-92-64-02243-0.
- Agence Africaine de Presse (24 July 2015). "Rwanda, DR Congo open trade talks". Dakar. Archived from the original on 3 October 2015.
- Agence France-Presse (16 August 2002). "Ethnic origins ignored in Rwanda's first census since genocide". Paris. Archived from the original on 3 February 2016.
- Aglietti, Stephanie (11 September 2014). "Rwanda cricket, growing a game of hope". Yahoo Sports. Paris. Agence France-Presse. Archived from the original on 17 October 2019.
- Agutamba, Kenneth (4 December 2014). "Rwanda graft index falters but ranking unaffected". The New Times. Kigali. Archived from the original on 10 October 2017.
- Al Jazeera (20 September 2007). "Rwanda blames DR Congo for violence". Doha. Archived from the original on 13 May 2011.
- Anyango, Gloria I. (4 February 2010). "The Barbecue Chef who masters his roast". The New Times. Kigali. Archived from the original on 10 October 2017.
- Appiah, Anthony; Gates, Henry Louis (2010). Encyclopedia of Africa, Volume 1 (illustrated ed.). Oxford: Oxford University Press. ISBN 978-0-19-533770-9. Archived from the original on 11 January 2023.
- Asiimwe, Bosco R (28 September 2011). "Gov't to sanction officials who failed to declare wealth". The New Times. Kigali. Archived from the original on 10 October 2017.
- Asiimwe, Dicta (20 December 2014). "Uganda races to meet Monetary Union date". The EastAfrican. Nairobi. Archived from the original on 8 December 2015.
- Auzias, Dominique (2007). Rwanda (in French). Paris: Petit Futé. ISBN 978-2-7469-2037-8.
- Banda, Honoré (12 February 2015). "Rwanda's job crunch". Paris: The Africa Report. Archived from the original on 19 January 2019.
- Baringanire, Paul; Malik, Kabir; Banerjee, Sudeshna Ghosh (2014). "Scaling Up Access to Electricity: The Case of Rwanda" (PDF). World Bank Group. Archived (PDF) from the original on 21 March 2016.
- "Rwanda redrawn to reflect compass". BBC News. 3 January 2006a. Archived from the original on 1 June 2013.
- "Team reaches Nile's 'true source'". BBC News. 31 March 2006b. Archived from the original on 1 June 2013.
- "Hutus 'killed Rwanda President Juvenal Habyarimana'". BBC News. 12 January 2010a. Archived from the original on 1 June 2013.
- "Q&A: DR Congo conflict". BBC News. 27 August 2010b. Archived from the original on 18 March 2020.
- "Rwanda gives DR Congo back tonnes of smuggled minerals". BBC News. 3 November 2011. Archived from the original on 23 February 2020.
- "Rwanda profile – Media". BBC News. 23 June 2015a. Archived from the original on 7 May 2019.
- "Rwanda country profile – Overview". BBC News. 4 June 2015b. Archived from the original on 23 February 2020.
- "Rwanda 'gacaca' genocide courts finish work". BBC News. 18 June 2012a. Archived from the original on 8 March 2015.
- "Goma: M23 rebels capture DR Congo city". BBC News. 20 November 2012b.
- "Why cricket is gaining in popularity in Rwanda". BBC News. 24 December 2014. Archived from the original on 30 March 2015.
- "Rwanda". BBC Sport. 13 August 2012. Archived from the original on 30 July 2012.
- "Commonwealth Games 2010: Participating nations in Africa". BBC Sport. 27 September 2010. Archived from the original on 17 December 2018.
- Berry, Philip; Lewis, Janice; Williams, Cara (1990). "32: East African Highlands". In Turner, B.L. (ed.). The Earth as Transformed by Human Action: Global and Regional Changes in the Biosphere Over the Past 300 Years (Illustrated, Reprint ed.). Cambridge: Cambridge University Press. ISBN 978-0-521-36357-0. Archived from the original on 1 July 2023.
- Best Country Reports (2007). "Temperature Map of Rwanda". World Trade Press. Archived from the original on 17 November 2012.
- Bishumba, Richard (7 February 2015). "Meet Mutokambali, the national hoops team coach". The New Times. Kigali. Archived from the original on 10 October 2017.
- Bowdler, Neil (14 May 2010). "Apprentice adviser Nick Hewer's Rwanda mission". BBC News. Archived from the original on 1 June 2013.
- Bowcott, Owen (2 April 2014). "Rwanda genocide: the fight to bring the perpetrators to justice". The Guardian. London. Archived from the original on 20 February 2020.
- Boyd, J. Barron (December 1979). "African Boundary Conflict: An Empirical Study". African Studies Review. 22 (3): 1–14. doi:10.2307/523892. JSTOR 523892. S2CID 145722128.
- Bralirwa (I). "History and Background Information". Archived from the original on 3 July 2015.
- Bralirwa (II). "Sparkling beverages". Archived from the original on 4 July 2015.
- Bralirwa (III). "Beer". Archived from the original on 6 November 2015.
- Briggs, Jimmy (August 2004). "A dance of hope in Rwanda". Dance Magazine. New York, N.Y.
- Briggs, Philip; Booth, Janice (2006). Rwanda – The Bradt Travel Guide (3rd ed.). London: Bradt Travel Guides. ISBN 978-1-84162-180-7.
- Bucyensenge, Jean-Pierre (17 September 2014). "Farmers wary as new weather patterns threaten production". The New Times. Kigali. Archived from the original on 14 March 2018.
- Butera, Saul (9 January 2010). "MTN Rwanda deploys new Internet technology". The New Times. Kigali. Archived from the original on 10 October 2017.
- Butera, Saul (6 April 2011). "MTN, Tigo Reaping From Rwandatel Misery". The New Times. Kigali. Archived from the original on 10 October 2017.
- Carlin, John (13 July 2003). "Rwanda's magic moment". The Guardian. London. Archived from the original on 3 April 2019.
- CECAFA. "Kagame Cup Championships". CECAFA Website. Archived from the original on 24 September 2019.
- Central Intelligence Agency (CIA) (I). "Rwanda". The World Factbook. Archived from the original on 9 January 2021.
- Central Intelligence Agency (CIA) (III) (2011). "Rank Order – Life expectancy at birth". The World Factbook. Archived from the original on 2 January 2018.
- Centre For Aviation (22 December 2014). "RwandAir plans further regional expansion in 2015 and launch of long-haul services in 2017". Archived from the original on 7 November 2015.
- Chrétien, Jean-Pierre (2003). The Great Lakes of Africa: Two Thousand Years of History. Cambridge, Massachusetts: MIT Press. ISBN 978-1-890951-34-4. Archived from the original on 11 January 2023.
- City Population (2012). "Rwanda: Cities". Archived from the original on 30 August 2019.
- Clark, Phil (5 August 2010). "Rwanda: Kagame's power struggle". The Guardian. London. Archived from the original on 23 February 2020.
- Coleman, Isobel (7 April 2010). "Rwanda: Road to Recovery". The Huffington Post. New York, N.Y. Archived from the original on 2 November 2013.
- Commission Juridique Et Constitutionnelle Du Rwanda (CJCR) (26 May 2003). "Constitution of the Republic of Rwanda". Archived from the original on 25 March 2009.
- Copnall, James (2 February 2004). "Camara breaks Rwanda hearts". The Guardian. London. Archived from the original on 18 June 2018.
- Craig, Tara (23 October 2012). "Unibra ramps up in Rwanda". Brewer's Guardian. Reigate. Archived from the original on 5 August 2019.
- CyclingNews.com (27 July 2012). "Niyonshuti to carry Rwandan flag in Olympic Games opening ceremony". London. Archived from the original on 6 August 2019.
- Dallaire, Roméo (2005). Shake Hands with the Devil: The Failure of Humanity in Rwanda. London: Arrow. ISBN 978-0-09-947893-5. Archived from the original on 1 July 2023.
- Delawala, Imtiyaz (7 September 2001). "What Is Coltan?". ABC News. New York, N.Y. Archived from the original on 8 December 2015.
- Office of the Prime Minister, Republic of Rwanda. "Statement on Cabinet Decisions of 29.07.2014". Archived from the original on 14 April 2015.
- Dorsey, Learthen (1994). Historical Dictionary of Rwanda. Metuchen, N.J.: Scarecrow Press. ISBN 978-0-8108-2820-9.
- Drobac, Peter; Naughton, Brienna (15 June 2014). "Health Equity in Rwanda: The New Rwanda, Twenty Years Later". Harvard International Review. Cambridge, Massachusetts. Archived from the original on 8 December 2015.
- Emery, Neal (20 February 2013). "Rwanda's Historic Health Recovery: What the U.S. Might Learn". The Atlantic. Washington, D.C. Archived from the original on 17 September 2019.
- Encyclopædia Britannica (2010). "Rwanda". Archived from the original on 30 April 2015.
- Evans, Ruth (20 January 2014). "Rwanda's health service evolution – podcast". The Guardian. London. Archived from the original on 3 January 2019.
- Fegley, Randall (2016). A History of Rwandan Identity and Trauma: The Mythmakers' Victims. Langham, Maryland: Lexington Books. ISBN 978-1-49851944-1.
- Fletcher, Pascal (30 November 2009). "Rwanda accepted into Commonwealth only 15 years after genocide". The Scotsman. Edinburgh. Archived from the original on 11 May 2011.
- Food and Agriculture Organization / World Food Programme (FAO / WFP) (1 July 1997). "Special Report: FAO/WFP Crop and Food Supply Assessment Mission to Rwanda". Archived from the original on 2 October 2013.
- Francophonie. "Welcome to the International Organisation of La Francophonie's official website". Archived from the original on 1 April 2014.
- Gasore, Ben (31 December 2014). "Digital broadcasting stirs up local TV industry, but ..." The New Times. Kigali. Archived from the original on 10 October 2017.
- Gourevitch, Philip (2000). We Wish To Inform You That Tomorrow We Will Be Killed With Our Families (Reprint ed.). London; New York, N.Y.: Picador. ISBN 978-0-330-37120-9. Archived from the original on 11 January 2023.
- Government of Rwanda (I). "Official Holidays". Archived from the original on 16 September 2019.
- Government of Rwanda (II). "Animals". Archived from the original on 18 September 2019.
- Grainger, Sarah (18 June 2007). "East Africa trade bloc expanded". BBC News. Archived from the original on 1 June 2013.
- Henley, Jon (31 October 2007). "Scar tissue". The Guardian. London. Archived from the original on 1 September 2013.
- Heuler, Hilary (12 December 2011). "Uganda, Rwanda Move to Mend Troubled Relations". Voice of America News. Archived from the original on 11 February 2012.
- Hodd, Michael (1994). East African Handbook. Trade & Travel Publications. ISBN 978-0-8442-8983-0. Archived from the original on 1 July 2023.
- Hoye, Russell; Smith, Aaron C.T; Nicholson, Matthew; Stewart, Bob (2015). Sport Management: Principles and Applications (4th ed.). Abingdon: Routledge. ISBN 978-1-138-83960-1.
- Wells, Sarah; Burnett, Maria; Huggins, Christopher; Haskell, Leslie; Des Forges, Alison (2008). Law and reality: progress in judicial reform in Rwanda. Human Rights Watch. ISBN 978-1-56432-366-8. Archived from the original on 24 July 2014.
- International Basketball Federation (21 November 2011). "CIV – Ivory Coast to host AfroBasket 2013". Mies. Archived from the original on 4 March 2016.
- International Development Association (IDA). "Rwanda: Bringing Clean Water to Rural Communities". Archived from the original on 11 July 2010.
- International Monetary Fund (IMF) (November 2000). "An approach to the Poverty Reduction Action Plan for Rwanda: The Interim PRSP" (PDF). Archived (PDF) from the original on 10 October 2017.
- International Monetary Fund (IMF) (I) (2012). "Gross domestic product based on purchasing-power-parity (PPP) per capita GDP, Rwanda, 1994". World Economic Outlook Database. Archived from the original on 28 March 2020.
- International Paralympic Committee (4 March 2015). "Rwandan para-sport develops at pace". Bonn. Archived from the original on 4 April 2019.
- Jefremovas, Villia (1995). "Acts of Human Kindness: Tutsi, Hutu and the Genocide". Issue: A Journal of Opinion. 23 (2): 28–31. doi:10.2307/1166503. JSTOR 1166503.
- Jørgensen, Sven Erik (2005). Lake and reservoir management. Amsterdam: Elsevier. ISBN 978-0-444-51678-7.
- Kamere, Emmanuel (17 March 2011). "Enforcing Contracts: The Experience of Rwanda" (PDF). Archived from the original (PDF) on 4 March 2016.
- Kezio-Musoke, David (16 September 2014). "A Beautiful Rwandan Economy ... Made in Kenya". Inspire Rwanda. Kigali. Archived from the original on 19 November 2015.
- Kigali City. "Kigali at a glance". Archived from the original on 28 February 2014.
- King, David C. (2007). Rwanda (Cultures of the World). New York, N.Y.: Benchmark Books. ISBN 978-0-7614-2333-1. Archived from the original on 11 January 2023.
- Kiwuwa, David E. (2012). Ethnic Politics and Democratic Transition in Rwanda. Abingdon: Routledge. ISBN 978-0-415-61608-9.
- Koenig, Ann M. (9 September 2014). "Rwanda: Reorganization of public higher education underway". American Association of Collegiate Registrars and Admissions Officers. Washington, D.C. Archived from the original on 30 April 2015.
- KT Press (11 February 2015). "Over a Million Tourists Help Rwanda's Tourism Revenue Cross US$ 300m". London: PR Newswire. Archived from the original on 10 October 2017.
- Lavelle, John (5 July 2008). "Resurrecting the East African Shilling". East African Business Week. Kampala. Archived from the original on 7 October 2012.
- Linden, Ian; Linden, Jane (1977). Church and Revolution in Rwanda (illustrated ed.). Manchester: Manchester University Press. ISBN 978-0719-00-671-5.
- Longman, Timothy (2010). Christianity and Genocide in Rwanda. Cambridge, UK; New York, N.Y.: Cambridge University Press. ISBN 978-0-521-26953-7.
- Longman, Timothy (2017). Memory and Justice in Post-Genocide Rwanda. Cambridge, UK; New York, N.Y.: Cambridge University Press. ISBN 978-1-107-67809-5.
- Maboja, Wilhelmina (12 February 2015). "Rwanda and Uganda Move to Strengthen Relations". Johannesburg: CNBC Africa. Archived from the original on 23 September 2015.
- MacGregor, Karen (21 June 2014). "A new university, new international leader, new future". University World News. No. 325. London. Archived from the original on 10 October 2017.
- Mackay, Duncan (24 December 2009). "Rwanda launch bid for 2013 African Championships". insidethegames.biz. Milton Keynes. Archived from the original on 3 April 2019.
- Majyambere, Gertrude (14 May 2010). "Rwandatel's Landline Telephony Increases By 7 Percent". The New Times. Kigali. Archived from the original on 10 October 2017.
- Mamdani, Mahmood (2002). When Victims Become Killers: Colonialism, Nativism, and the Genocide in Rwanda. Princeton, N.J.: Princeton University Press. ISBN 978-0-691-10280-1. Archived from the original on 11 January 2023.
- Howell, Elizabeth (20 May 2014). "Newly discovered bush tiger praying mantis in Rwanda is a vicious hunter". NBC News.
- Mbabazi, Linda (11 May 2008). "Hip Hop Dominating Music Industry". The New Times. Kigali. Archived from the original on 10 October 2017.
- McCracken, Kathryn; Colucci, Emma (2014). "Using sport and play to achieve educational objectives" ( (PDF)). In Dudfield, Oliver (ed.). Strengthening Sport for Development and Peace: National Policies and Strategies. London: Commonwealth Secretariat. ISBN 978-1-84859-912-3. Archived from the original on 18 April 2015.
- McGreal, Chris (16 January 2009). "Why Rwanda said adieu to French". The Guardian. London. Archived from the original on 18 May 2015.
- McGreal, Chris (1 October 2010). "Delayed UN report links Rwanda to Congo genocide". The Guardian. London. Archived from the original on 21 August 2016.
- Mehta, Hitesh; Katee, Christine (2005). "Virunga Massif Sustainable Tourism Development Plan" (PDF). International Gorilla Conservation Programme (IGCP). Archived from the original (PDF) on 4 March 2014.
- Melvern, Linda (2004). Conspiracy to Murder: The Rwandan Genocide. Revised. London; New York, N.Y.: Verso Books. ISBN 978-1-85984-588-2.
- Milmo, Cahal (29 March 2006). "Flashback to terror: Survivors of Rwandan genocide watch screening of Shooting Dogs". The Independent. London. Archived from the original on 10 October 2017.
- Ministry of Agriculture (MINAGRI), Republic of Rwanda (10 June 2006). "Livestock production". Archived from the original on 23 March 2012.
- Ministry of Education (MINEDUC), Republic of Rwanda (13 July 2010). "Achievements (2003–2010)" (PDF). Archived from the original (PDF) on 11 March 2012.
- Ministry of Finance and Economic Planning (MINECOFIN), Republic of Rwanda (June 2002). "Poverty Reduction Strategy Paper" (PDF). Archived (PDF) from the original on 23 October 2012.
- Ministry of Infrastructure (MININFRA), Republic of Rwanda (June 2013). "Ministry of Infrastructure Final Report on Transport Sector Strategic Plan for EDPRS2" (PDF). Archived from the original (PDF) on 4 March 2016.
- Ministry of Infrastructure (MININFRA), Republic of Rwanda (9 August 2017). "New Bugesera International Airport construction works kick-off". Archived from the original on 21 February 2018.
- Ministry of Local Government (MINALOC), Republic of Rwanda (2004). "Administrative Units". Archived from the original on 22 October 2013.
- Ministry of Local Government (MINALOC), Republic of Rwanda (August 2007). "Rwanda Decentralization Strategic Framework". Archived from the original on 29 March 2013.
- Ministry of Sports and Culture, Republic of Rwanda (MINISPOC) (October 2012). "Rwanda Sports Development Policy". Archived from the original on 18 April 2015.
- Montague, James (2014). Thirty-One Nil: On the Road With Football's Outsiders, A World Cup Odyssey. London: Bloomsbury Publishing. p. 67. ISBN 978-1-4081-5884-5.
- Mugabe, Bonnie; Kamasa, Peter (18 October 2014). "Who will win the 2014/15 national football league?". The New Times. Kigali. Archived from the original on 10 October 2017.
- Mugisha, Ivan R (3 June 2013). "Liquid Telecom acquires Rwandatel assets". The New Times. Kigali. Archived from the original on 10 October 2017.
- Mugwe, David (3 June 2013). "Liquid Telecom acquires RwandaTel, eyes broadband market". The East African. Nairobi. Archived from the original on 5 October 2015.
- Mukaaya, Eddie (28 January 2008). "Tourism is Rwanda's biggest foreign exchange earner". The New Times. Kigali. Archived from the original on 28 February 2018.
- Mukaaya, Eddie (15 January 2009). "Mining industry generated $93 million in 2008". The New Times. Kigali. Archived from the original on 4 March 2016.
- Munyakazi, Augustine; Ntagaramba, Johnson Funga (2005). Atlas of Rwanda (in French). Oxford: Macmillan Education. ISBN 0-333-95451-3.
- Nakayima, Lillian (23 June 2010). "Nkombo Island's Hope for the Future". The New Times. Kigali. Archived from the original on 10 October 2017.
- Namata, Berna (28 December 2008). "Rwanda to restock water bodies with fisheries". The New Times. Kigali. Archived from the original on 10 October 2017.
- Nantaba, Eriosi (18 October 2010). "Rwanda services sector boosts GDP". East African Business Week. Kampala. Archived from the original on 19 October 2012.
- National Institute of Statistics of Rwanda (February 2012). "The third Integrated Household Living Conditions Survey (EICV 3) – Main indicators Report" (PDF). Archived from the original (PDF) on 20 November 2015.
- National Institute of Statistics of Rwanda (January 2014). "Fourth Population and Housing Census, Rwanda, 2012—Final Results: Main indicators report" (PDF). Archived from the original (PDF) on 24 September 2015.
- National Institute of Statistics of Rwanda (2015). "Featured indicators". Archived from the original on 8 April 2018.
- Ndengeye, Joseph (2014). "Country Report: Rwanda". In Keim, Marion; de Coning, Christo (eds.). Sport and Development Policy in Africa: Results of a Collaborative Study of Selected Country Cases. Stellenbosch: SUN Press. ISBN 978-1-920689-40-7.
- Ngarambe, Alex (21 September 2012). "Competition heats up for beer market". The EastAfrican. Nairobi. Archived from the original on 8 December 2015.
- Nielsen, Hannah; Spenceley, Anna (April 2010). "The success of tourism in Rwanda – Gorillas and more" (PDF). African Success Stories Study. World Bank & SNV Netherlands Development Organisation. Archived from the original (PDF) on 20 March 2014.
- Nile Basin Initiative (2010). "Nile Basin Countries". Archived from the original on 14 March 2012.
- Ntambara, Paul (9 December 2009). "Minister Irked By Big Number of Grass-Thatched Houses". The New Times. Kigali. Archived from the original on 10 October 2017.
- Nzabuheraheza, François Dominicus (2005). "Milk Production and Hygiene in Rwanda". African Journal of Food, Agriculture, Nutrition and Development. 5 (2). ISSN 1684-5374. Archived from the original on 3 March 2014.
- "Mandate". Office of the Ombudsman (in Kinyarwanda). Archived from the original on 6 August 2019.
- Opobo, Moses (24 May 2015). "Digital TV is opening the floodgates of opportunities for local content producers – Watta". The New Times. Kigali. Archived from the original on 10 October 2017.
- Organization of African Unity (OAU) (2000). "Rwanda – The preventable genocide" (PDF). The Report of International Panel of Eminent Personalities to Investigate the 1994 Genocide in Rwanda and Surrounding Events. Archived from the original (PDF) on 8 September 2015.
- Our Africa. "Rwanda: Climate & Agriculture". Archived from the original on 19 April 2018.
- Panapress (4 June 2003). "Rwandan Presidents promulgates new constitution". Dakar. Archived from the original on 10 October 2017.
- Partners In Health (20 November 2013). "Rwanda Launches Bold Medical Education Partnership". Boston, Mass. Archived from the original on 13 June 2017.
- Percival, Valerie; Homer-Dixon, Thomas (1995). "Environmental Scarcity and Violent Conflict, The Case of Rwanda". Occasional Paper: Project on Environment, Population and Security. University of Toronto. Archived from the original on 22 February 2012.
- Porter, Andrew (7 August 2008). "Europe 'ignoring French role in genocide'". The Daily Telegraph. London. Archived from the original on 1 May 2019.
- Prunier, Gérard (1995). The Rwanda Crisis, 1959–1994: History of a Genocide (second ed.). London: C. Hurst & Co. Publishers. ISBN 978-1-85065-243-4.
- Reporters Without Borders (14 April 2010). "Two leading independent weeklies suspended for six months". Archived from the original on 24 June 2013.
- "Rwanda completes $95 mln fibre optic network". Reuters. London. 16 March 2011. Archived from the original on 18 September 2012.
- Richards, Charles (24 July 1994). "Rwanda: Question Time: How could it happen?: Rebellion, slaughter, exodus, cholera: the catastrophe in Rwanda is beyond our worst imaginings. Who is to blame? Who are the Hutus and Tutsis? Can peace ever be restored? Some answers ..." The Independent. London. Archived from the original on 25 September 2015.
- Robbins, Tom (9 August 2013). "Bumpy ride". Financial Times. London. Archived from the original on 9 March 2016.
- Rosenberg, Tina (3 July 2012). "In Rwanda, Health Care Coverage That Eludes the U.S." The New York Times. New York, N.Y. Archived from the original on 3 February 2014.
- Royal Museum for Central Africa (RMCA). "Ingoma". Archived from the original on 12 May 2013.
- Rutayisire, Emmanuel (16 August 2013). "Institutes of higher learning to merge with University of Rwanda". The EastAfrican. Nairobi. Archived from the original on 14 April 2015.
- Rwanda Development Board (RDB) (I) (7 May 2010). "World Environment Day & Kwita Izina". Archived from the original on 11 May 2012.
- Rwanda Development Board (RDB) (II). "National Parks". Archived from the original on 13 April 2012.
- Rwanda Development Board (RDB) (III). "Akagera National Park". Archived from the original on 12 February 2018.
- Rwanda Development Gateway. "National Ballet – Urukerereza". Archived from the original on 14 March 2012.
- Rwanda Environment Management Authority (REMA) (Chapter 2) (2009). "Chap II. Population, Health and human settlements". Rwanda State of Environment and Outlook Report. Archived from the original on 11 September 2013.
- Rwanda Environment Management Authority (REMA) (Chapter 5) (2009). "Chap V. Biodiversity and Genetic Resources". Rwanda State of Environment and Outlook Report. Archived from the original on 11 September 2013.
- Rwanda Governance Board. "Umuganda". Archived from the original on 20 October 2019.
- Rwanda Utilities Regulatory Authority (RURA) (December 2011). "Statistics and tariff information in telecom sector as of December 2011" (PDF). Archived from the original (PDF) on 10 October 2017.
- Rwanda Utilities Regulatory Authority (RURA) (June 2015). "Statistics and tariff information in telecom sector as of June 2015" (PDF). Archived from the original (PDF) on 4 March 2016.
- Samuelson, Beth Lewis; Freedman, Sarah Warshauer (2010). "Language policy, multilingual education, and power in Rwanda". Language Policy. 9 (3): 191–215. doi:10.1007/s10993-010-9170-7. Archived from the original on 21 April 2018.
- Schöggl, Hans (1 October 2015). "Rwanda – List of Champions". Rec.Sport.Soccer Statistics Foundation. Archived from the original on 1 August 2012.
- Senelwa, Kennedy (25 July 2015). "Rwanda, Burundi, Tanzania plan joint railway project". The East African. Nairobi. Archived from the original on 8 December 2015.
- Shyaka, Anastase. "The Rwandan Conflict: Origin, Development, Exit Strategies" (PDF). National Unity and Reconciliation Commission, Republic of Rwanda. Archived (PDF) from the original on 29 December 2013.
- Smith, David (28 June 2015). "Lions to be reintroduced to Rwanda after 15-year absence following genocide". The Guardian. London. Archived from the original on 15 February 2020.
- Southern Province. "Governor". Archived from the original on 4 March 2012.
- Gmünder, Bruno (2007). Spartacus International Gay Guide 2007. Berlin: Bruno Gmunder Verlag.
- Strategic Foresight Group (2013). "Blue Peace for the Nile" (PDF). Archived from the original (PDF) on 26 February 2014.
- Straus, Scott (2013). The Order of Genocide: race, power, and war in Rwanda. Ithaca, NY: Cornell University Press. ISBN 978-0-8014-6714-1.
- Streissguth, Thomas (2007). Rwanda in Pictures. Minneapolis, Minn.: Twenty-First Century Books. ISBN 978-0-8225-8570-1.
- Southwood, Russell (19 October 2013). "What is Liquid Telecom upto after buying Rwandatel?". The East African. Nairobi. Archived from the original on 5 October 2015.
- Stanford University Swahili Department. "Where Swahili is Spoken". Archived from the original on 23 November 2016.
- Tabaro, Jean de la Croix (21 January 2015). "Rwanda Introduces Kiswahili in Curriculum". KT Press. London. Archived from the original on 8 December 2015.
- Tancott, Glen (30 June 2014). "Northern corridor". Transport World Africa. Johannesburg. Archived from the original on 13 August 2018.
- Tedrow, Riley (2015). "A survey of the praying mantises of Rwanda, including new records (Insecta, Mantodea)". Zootaxa. 4027 (1): 67–100. doi:10.11646/zootaxa.4027.1.3. PMID 26624167. Archived from the original on 28 March 2020.
- The New Times (13 June 2015). "VIDEO: The lions are now free to stroll Akagera Park". Kigali. Archived from the original on 11 July 2016.
- Transparency International (2014). "Corruption Perceptions Index 2014 Results". Archived from the original on 3 December 2014.
- Tumwebaze, Peterson (21 July 2016). "Coffee export revenue drops by 5% during 2015/16 FY". The New Times Rwanda. Archived from the original on 10 October 2017.
- Tumwebaze, Peterson (13 June 2015). "Kamembe airport reopens to flights". The New Times. Kigali. Archived from the original on 10 October 2017.
- Umutesi, Doreen (18 March 2015). "Rwandans urged to embrace rain water harvesting". The New Times. Kigali. Archived from the original on 10 October 2017.
- United Nations (I). "United Nations Member States". Archived from the original on 12 April 2014.
- United Nations (II). "International Trusteeship System". Archived from the original on 12 April 2014.
- United Nations (III). "Trust and Non-Self-Governing Territories (1945–1999)". Archived from the original on 26 March 2019.
- United Nations Development Programme (UNDP) (I) (2010). "Human Development Index Trends, 1980–2010" (PDF). Archived from the original (PDF) on 1 April 2012.
- United Nations Development Programme (UNDP) (II) (2015). "Millennium Development Goal 4: Reduce child mortality". Archived from the original on 15 September 2015.
- United Nations Development Programme (UNDP) (III) (2015). "Millennium Development Goal 5: Improve maternal health". Archived from the original on 15 September 2015.
- United Nations Development Programme (UNDP) (IV) (2015). "Millennium Development Goal 6: Combat HIV/AIDS, malaria, and other diseases". Archived from the original on 15 September 2015.
- United Nations Development Programme (UNDP) (V) (2013). "Human Development Report 2013: Rwanda" (PDF). Archived (PDF) from the original on 18 October 2018.
- United States Agency for International Development (USAID) (I) (2008). "Rwanda: Water and Sanitation Profile" (PDF). Archived from the original (PDF) on 29 October 2013.
- United States Agency for International Development (USAID) (II) (8 December 2014). "Health Insurance Expands Care For Rwanda's Poorest". Archived from the original on 4 March 2016.
- United States Agency for International Development (USAID) (III) (2015). "Rwanda: Global Health". Archived from the original on 14 August 2019.
- United States Department of State (2004). "Background Note: Rwanda". Background Notes. Archived from the original on 28 March 2020.
- "Rwands 2016 Human Rights Report" (PDF). U.S. Department of State's Country Reports on Human Rights Practices. 2016. Archived from the original (PDF) on 7 March 2017.
- Université Laval (2010). "Rwanda: Aménagement linguistique dans le monde" (in French). Archived from the original on 29 March 2013.
- Unrepresented Nations and Peoples Organization (UNPO) (25 March 2008). "Batwa". Archived from the original on 2 April 2014.
- USA Today (29 October 2008). "Congolese army claims attack by Rwandan troops". Tysons Corner, VA. Archived from the original on 4 November 2012.
- Walker, Robert (30 March 2004). "Rwanda still searching for justice". BBC News. Archived from the original on 26 August 2007.
- Walker, Robert (1 April 2004). "Rwanda's religious reflections". BBC News. Archived from the original on 1 June 2013.
- Wildlife Conservation Society (WCS). "Birds endemic to the Albertine Rift" (PDF). Albertine Rift Programme. Archived (PDF) from the original on 24 June 2013.
- Willgoss, Graham (30 October 2014). "Tour de Second Chance". Sport Magazine. No. 378. Archived from the original on 12 April 2015.
- Williams, Timothy P.; Abbott, Pamela; Mupenzi, Alfred (2015). "'Education at our school is not free': the hidden costs of fee-free schooling in Rwanda". Compare: A Journal of Comparative and International Education. 45 (6): 931–952. doi:10.1080/03057925.2014.938611. S2CID 153661006.
- Watson, Graeme; Renzi, Barbara Gabriella; Viggiani, Elisabetta (2010). Friends and Foes Volume II: Friendship and Conflict from Social and Political Perspectives. Newcastle upon Tyne: Cambridge Scholars Publishing. ISBN 978-1-4438-1993-0.
- Wiredu, Kwasi; Abraham, William E.; Irele, Abiola; Menkiti, Ifeanyi (2006). A companion to African philosophy. Malden, MA: Wiley-Blackwell. ISBN 978-1-4051-4567-1.
- World Bank (I). "Rwanda". Archived from the original on 3 April 2012.
- World Bank (II). "Internet users (per 100 people), graph". Archived from the original on 8 April 2016.
- World Bank (III). "School enrollment, tertiary (% gross), graph". Archived from the original on 8 April 2016.
- World Bank (IV). "Mortality rate, under-5 (per 1,000 live births)". Archived from the original on 14 November 2018.
- World Bank (V). "Health expenditure, public (% of GDP), 2010–2014". Archived from the original on 27 February 2020.
- World Bank (VI). "Health expenditure, public (% of GDP), 1995–1999". Archived from the original on 27 February 2020.
- World Bank (VII). "Life expectancy at birth, total (years), graph". Archived from the original on 8 April 2016.
- World Bank (VIII). "Mortality rate, under-5 (per 1,000 live births), graph". Archived from the original on 8 April 2016.
- World Bank (IX). "Incidence of tuberculosis (per 100,000 people), graph". Archived from the original on 9 April 2016.
- World Bank (X). "GDP (current US$), graph". Archived from the original on 28 June 2016.
- World Bank (XI). "International tourism, number of arrivals, graph". Archived from the original on 8 April 2016.
- World Bank (XII). "GINI index (World Bank estimate) – Rwanda". World Bank Open Data.
- World Bank (XIII). "Access to electricity (% of population)". Archived from the original on 8 April 2016.
- World Health Organization (WHO) (2015). WHO Country Cooperation Strategy at a glance: Rwanda (PDF). Archived from the original (PDF) on 4 March 2016.
- World Health Organization (WHO) (2008). "Sharing the burden of sickness: mutual health insurance in Rwanda". Bulletin of the World Health Organization. 86 (11): 817–908. ISSN 0042-9686. Archived from the original on 25 October 2013.
- World Meteorological Organization. "World Weather Information Service – Kigali". Archived from the original on 20 January 2021.
- World Resources Institute (WRI) (2006). "Agriculture and Food: Country profile – Rwanda". EarthTrends: The Environmental Information Portal. Archived from the original on 2 April 2012.
- World Resources Report (2011). "Maintenance of Hydropower Potential in Rwanda Through Ecosystem Restoration" (PDF). Archived from the original (PDF) on 24 March 2012.
- World Trade Organization (WTO) (30 September 2004). "Continued reforms and technical assistance should help Rwanda in its efforts to achieve a dynamic economy". Trade policy review: Rwanda. Archived from the original on 2 October 2013.
- World Wide Fund for Nature (WWF) (2001). "Terrestrial Ecoregions: Albertine Rift montane forests (AT0101)". Archived from the original on 22 December 2004.
- Xinhua News Agency (26 August 2015). "Rwanda deplores French decision on case of genocide suspect". Beijing. Archived from the original on 2 March 2016.
