= Papias Malimba Musafiri =

Rwandan academic

- Born: Rwanda
- Citizenship: Rwanda
- Education: University of Dar es Salaam (Bachelor of Commerce); IIT Roorkee (Master of Business Administration); VIT University (Doctor of Philosophy)
- Occupations: Academic, researcher and politician
- Years active: 2001–present
- Known for: Academics, research and public service
- Title: Cabinet Minister of Education in the Cabinet of Rwanda

Papias Malimba Musafiri is a Rwandan academic, researcher and politician, who has served as the Minister of Education in the Rwandan cabinet, since 25 June 2015, replacing Prof. Silas Lwakabamba.

== Background and education ==
He holds a Bachelor of Commerce, obtained from the University of Dar es Salaam. He also holds a Master of Business Administration with majors in Finance and Information Technology, obtained from the Indian Institute of Technology Roorkee. His Doctor of Philosophy in management was awarded by Vellore Institute of Technology, also in India.

== Career ==
Circa 2001, Musafiri has served in various roles in academia, research and as a consultant. Prior to the establishment of the University of Rwanda (UR) in 2013, he held senior management positions in several institutions that today comprise the UR. He has served as (a) Director of Administration and Human Resources (b) Dean, Faculty of Management (c) Vice Rector Academics and (d) Acting Rector, in former institutions of higher education. Immediately prior to his appointment as education minister, he was the Principal of the College of Business and Economics (CBE) of the University of Rwanda.

In the cabinet reshuffle of 5 October 2016, and that of 31 August 2017, he was retained in cabinet and he retained the education portfolio. In his role as minister of education, he announced the termination and expulsion of Ugandan teachers from Rwanda, following the expiry of their teaching contracts.

== See also ==
- Education in Rwanda
- Parliament of Rwanda
