= Silas Lwakabamba =

Rwandan professor

Professor Silas Lwakabamba

Managing Director at Coventry University Africa Hub
- In office May 2021 – Present

Rwanda’s Minister of Education

Minister
- In office July 2014 – June 2015
- Preceded by: Vincent Biruta

Rwanda’s Minister of Infrastructure

Minister
- In office February 2013 – July 2014
- Succeeded by: James Musoni

Personal details
- Born: Silas Stanislaus Bernard Lwakabamba; 1947 (age 78–79) Tanganyika Territory, British Empire
- Education: University of Leeds (BSc), (PhD)
- Profession: Mechanical Engineer

Silas Stanislaus Bernard Lwakabamba or simply Silas Lwakabamba (born 1947), is a Rwandan engineer, academic and politician. Since May 2021, he has been serving as the Regional Managing Director of Coventry University African Hub, based in Kigali, Rwanda. Lwakabamba holds a PhD in Mechanical Engineering from University of Leeds in England since 1975. Since 1997, he served as the founding Rector of Rwanda’s Kigali Institute of Science and Technology. In 2006, he was appointed Rector of National University of Rwanda until 2013. Lwakabamba served as Rwanda's Minister of Infrastructure between February 2013 and July 2014, he also served as Rwanda's Minister of Education since July 2014 until June 2015.

== Early life and education ==
Silas Lwakabamba was born in 1947, he grew up and studied his elementary and secondary education in Tanzania. He attended the University of Leeds in England where he studied Mechanical engineering, graduating with a Bachelor of Science in 1971, a Doctor of Philosophy in 1975, and he attained his Professorship in 1981 from University of Dar es Salaam. Lwakabamba was awarded twice the honorary degrees in recognition of his contribution to higher education, in 2005 the Doctor of Technology by the Glasgow Caledonian University in Scotland, United Kingdom, and in 2007 the Doctor of engineering by the Solent University in Southampton, England.

== Academic career ==
=== University of Dar es Salaam ===
After graduating with a PhD in Mechanical engineering from University of Leeds, Lwakabamba returned to Tanzania, he joined the staff of the Faculty of Engineering at the University of Dar es Salaam and served as head of Mechanical Engineering Department until 1982. Subsequently, he became Dean of the Faculty at the same institution until 1985.

=== ARCEDEM ===
In 1985, Lwakabamba moved to Nigeria and joined African Regional Center for Engineering Design and Manufacturing (ARCEDEM), a UN-sponsored project, based in Ibadan, Nigeria with aim of assisting African member states in development of capability for engineering design and manufacturing of industrial and agricultural machines and equipment. He served as director of training and extension services, until 1997.

=== Rwandan Universities ===
In 1997, he moved to Rwanda and became founding Vice Chancellor of Kigali Institute of Science and Technology (KIST). Lwakabamba was a leader for a Kigali-based institution which was created in partnership between the Rwanda Ministry of Education, UNDP Rwanda, and GTZ. He served in this position until 2006.

Subsequently, he was appointed by President of Republic of Rwanda, Paul Kagame, as Vice Chancellor of National University of Rwanda, a former largest university in Rwanda which was merged with other higher education institutions of Rwandan government into the created University of Rwanda in 2013. While Lwakabamba was in the office he also chaired Inter-University Council of East Africa among others. Lwakabamba served the positions until 2013.

In October 2015, Lwakabamba was appointed Vice Chancellor of University of Kibungo also known as University of Agriculture, Technology and Education of Kibungo (INATEK) which was based in Ngoma, Rwanda. He resigned from position after two years, Lwakabamba told the Igihe.Com that poor working relationship with owners of the institution was the reason.

== Career in politics ==
Lwakabamba was appointed by President Paul Kagame in the Cabinet of Rwanda as Minister of Infrastructure on February 25, 2013. He succeeded Albert Nsengiyumva, during his tenure, Lwakabamba worked on finalizing of the KivuWatt Power Station project among others, a first methane gas-fired thermal power plant in Rwanda. He served the office until July 2014.

Subsequently, he was appointed as Minister of Education succeeding Vincent Biruta. While Lwakabamba was in the office, he called for more research to boost Rwandan education. The Ministry of Education signed a long-term contracts with IBM and Microsoft for boosting Rwanda education and research system. He served the office until June 2015.

== Additional career ==
=== Board memberships ===
- Board Chairman, Rwanda Initiative for Sustainable Development, (2016 to 2018).
- Board Chairman, Inter University Council of East Africa (IUCEA), (2010 to 2012).
- Board Chairman, Rwandatel, (2001 to 2006).
- President, Institution of Engineers Rwanda (IER), (1999 to 2000).
