= Language policy in Rwanda =

Policy and usage of languages in Rwanda

Language policy in Rwanda is the set of constitutional provisions, laws, and government decisions that govern the status, use, and teaching of languages in Rwanda. Although Kinyarwanda is the mother tongue of almost the entire population, Rwanda has four official languages: Kinyarwanda (the national language), English, French, and Swahili (Kiswahili).

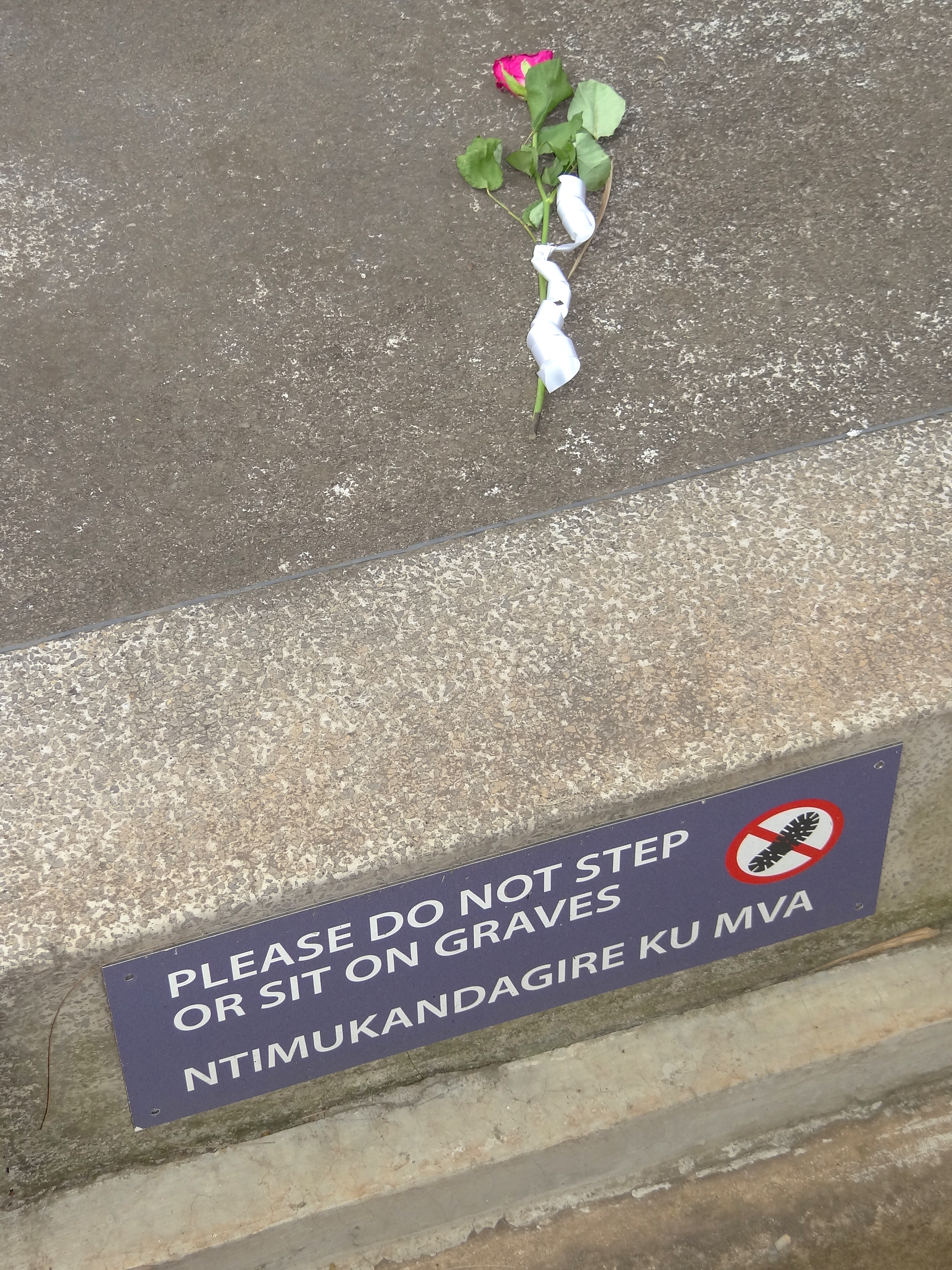
English / Kinyarwanda bilingual sign at the Kigali Genocide Memorial

The country has undergone several major language-policy shifts over the past century, most notably the 2008 transition from French to English in public administration and education. Academic studies have characterised the reform as rapid and contested, with effects on schooling, state administration, and Rwanda's international orientation.

== Constitutional and legal framework ==
Article 8 of the Constitution of Rwanda of 2003, as revised in 2015, states that "the national language is Kinyarwanda" and that the official languages are Kinyarwanda, English and French; it also allows an organic law to add or remove an official language. Swahili was added by Organic Law N° 02/2017 establishing Kiswahili as an official language, published in the Official Gazette in May 2017.

The institution responsible for preserving national heritage, safeguarding Kinyarwanda, and promoting Rwandan culture is the Rwanda Cultural Heritage Academy (Inteko y'Umuco). Operational language-in-education decisions are made by the Ministry of Education (MINEDUC) and implemented through the Rwanda Basic Education Board (REB). The national curriculum uses British English spelling conventions.

== Historical background ==
=== Pre-colonial period ===
Before European colonisation, Kinyarwanda was the recognised language of the Kingdom of Rwanda and the language of instruction in traditional institutions such as Itorero for young men and Ibohero for young women. Rwanda differs from many sub-Saharan African states in having one language spoken by almost the entire population; the 2002 census recorded Kinyarwanda as spoken by 99.4 per cent of the population.

=== German colonial period (1898–1916) ===
When the German Empire established its administration over the Kingdom of Rwanda in 1898 as part of German East Africa, it introduced Swahili, the administrative language of the wider colony, in Rwanda. Swahili was used to facilitate colonial administration through a common administrative language across German East Africa.

=== Belgian period (1916–1962) ===
Following Belgium's military takeover in 1916 and the later League of Nations mandate, French replaced Swahili as the language of administration and medium of instruction. Schools run by Catholic missionaries played a central role in colonial education, with Kinyarwanda used in early instruction and French used at higher levels. Kinyarwanda nevertheless remained the main spoken language for the wider population.

=== Post-independence (1962–1994) ===
Post-independence constitutions recognised Kinyarwanda as the national language and Kinyarwanda and French as official languages. French remained important in administration and education after independence. In 1978, a general educational reform known as "Rwandanisation" designated Kinyarwanda as the medium of instruction from grade 1 through grade 8. The policy was reversed from 1991, when French was reintroduced as the medium of instruction from grade 4 onward.

=== Post-genocide reforms (1994–2008) ===
After the 1994 Genocide against the Tutsi, the return of refugees from neighbouring countries affected Rwanda's linguistic context. Many returnees from Anglophone countries such as Uganda, Kenya, and Tanzania had been educated in English, including senior figures of the Rwandan Patriotic Front (RPF) such as President Paul Kagame.

In 1996, the Ministry of Education introduced a trilingual education policy, adding English alongside French as a possible medium of instruction after the first three years of primary school. The change reflected Rwanda's post-genocide linguistic context, including the return of Rwandans educated in Anglophone countries; before 1994, French had been the medium of instruction from grade 4 onwards. Kinyarwanda remained the medium of instruction in the first three years of primary school, while French and English could be used from grade 4 onwards.

English was introduced into language-in-education policy in the 1996–1997 revision and was later recognised as an official language in the 2003 Constitution, alongside Kinyarwanda and French.

=== 2008 language policy shift to English ===
In October 2008, the Rwandan Cabinet adopted a resolution making English the medium of instruction in government schools, with implementation beginning in the 2009 academic year. French was reduced from a medium of instruction to a subject in the school curriculum. The policy also extended beyond schools, with English introduced in government institutions and the private sector.

Government officials presented the shift to English as supporting Rwanda's economic development and regional integration, including communication with other East African Community members, which Rwanda had joined in 2007. Rwanda joined the Commonwealth of Nations in November 2009; at the time, Rwanda and Mozambique were the only Commonwealth members without historical ties to the British Empire. President Kagame stated in 2010 that the government was prioritising "the language that will help our children to be more competent and will serve our country's vision of development".

Scholars have linked the change to political factors, including Rwanda's deteriorating relations with France and the prominence of Anglophone returnees within the post-1994 leadership.

In February 2011, the Ministry of Education modified the 2008 policy so that Kinyarwanda again became the medium of instruction for the first three years of primary school, with English taught as a subject. Implementation remained difficult, including because some private schools continued to prioritise English-medium instruction. The 2015 Competence-Based Curriculum continued the use of Kinyarwanda as the medium of instruction in lower primary education in public and government-aided schools.

=== Anglicisation of the public sphere (2008–present) ===
==== Urban landscape and transport signage ====
Changes in Rwanda's linguistic landscape were also visible in urban signage. In 2012, Kigali introduced a new alphanumeric street-addressing system, replacing many earlier commemorative and descriptive street names. The system uses district-based prefixes such as KN for Nyarugenge, KG for Gasabo and KK for Kicukiro, followed by a number and an English street-type abbreviation such as St (Street), Rd (Road) or Ave (Avenue).

Studies of Rwanda's linguistic landscape have also noted the use of English in transport-related signs and road markings.

==== Currency and commercial signage ====
In December 2014, the National Bank of Rwanda issued new Rwandan franc banknotes in denominations of 2,000 and 5,000, from which French had been removed. Text on those notes appeared in Kinyarwanda on the front and English on the back.

A study of Rwanda's commercial linguistic landscape found that English-only shop signs in sampled Kigali streets rose from 23% in 2005–2008 to almost 58% in 2018, alongside a decline in the visible use of French. The same study links this shift to post-2008 language-policy changes and official promotion of English in administration, education and economic development.

=== Adoption of Swahili (2017) ===
In 2017, Rwanda adopted an organic law establishing Swahili as the country's fourth official language. The measure was linked to Rwanda's membership of the East African Community, whose treaty calls for the promotion of Swahili among member states. The law was assented to by President Paul Kagame on 20 April 2017 and came into force when it was published in the Official Gazette on 1 May 2017.

Swahili was already included in the national curriculum as a language subject before it became an official language. The 2015 Competence-Based Curriculum lists Kinyarwanda, French and Swahili as language subjects, with English as the language of learning from upper primary to upper secondary level.

=== 2019 return to English in lower primary ===
On 5 December 2019, the Ministry of Education announced that public and government-aided schools using Kinyarwanda at lower primary level would gradually transition to English as the medium of instruction. The communiqué also allowed private schools that had already been using another medium of instruction at lower primary level to continue doing so. Kinyarwanda remained a mandatory subject in both public and private schools.

The decision reversed the 2015 Competence-Based Curriculum arrangement under which Kinyarwanda was the language of learning in pre-primary and lower primary education, while other languages were taught as subjects. The change was criticised by civil society organisations and education specialists, who argued that the previous policy was supported by research on mother-tongue instruction and UNESCO recommendations.

The 2026 UNESCO Global Education Monitoring Report later linked the rise in primary-school repetition after 2020 partly to the 2019 language-of-instruction change.

== Language literacy ==
According to the 2022 Fifth Rwanda Population and Housing Census (RPHC5), 78.8% of residents aged 15 and over were literate in at least one language, while 21.2% were illiterate. Literacy was highest in Kinyarwanda, at 78.3%, followed by English at 21.2%, French at 8.2% and Swahili at 4.0%.

Because many literate Rwandans read more than one language, these single-language figures overlap. The RPHC5 also reports language combinations, showing the specific set of languages each person could read. Of the total population aged 15 and over:

- 54.0% were literate in Kinyarwanda only;
- 14.1% in Kinyarwanda and English;
- 4.1% in Kinyarwanda, English, and French;
- 1.9% in Kinyarwanda and French;
- 4.7% in other combinations, including combinations involving Swahili;
- 21.2% reported no language of literacy.

Literacy rates were higher in Kigali than in the rest of the country. In the capital, 89.9% of residents aged 15 and over were literate in Kinyarwanda, 41.0% in English, 19.5% in French, 11.7% in Swahili, and 2.7% in other languages, all above the national averages.

Compared with the 2012 Fourth Population and Housing Census (RPHC4), when literacy stood at 67.7% in Kinyarwanda, 14.7% in English, and 11.4% in French, the RPHC5 figures show higher Kinyarwanda and English literacy and lower French literacy. The 2022 census also reported Swahili literacy separately; in 2012, Swahili had been included under "Other".

The 2022 language-combination data also show that French literacy was largely concentrated among people who were also literate in English. Nationally, 5.9% of residents aged 15 and over were literate in both English and French, while 2.3% were literate in French but not English. In Kigali, 15.6 percentage points of the 19.5% literate in French were also literate in English.

=== Languages ===
Kinyarwanda is a Bantu language of the Rwanda-Rundi group and is mutually intelligible with Kirundi, the national language of Burundi. It is spoken in Rwanda and by communities in neighbouring countries, including eastern Democratic Republic of the Congo, southern Uganda and parts of Tanzania.

The use of English in Rwanda expanded after 1994, partly through the return of Rwandans from Anglophone countries, especially Uganda, and later through its wider use in official contexts and higher education. Rwandan English has been described as sharing features with other East African varieties of English, including a smaller vowel inventory than Received Pronunciation and little or no vowel reduction in unstressed syllables.

== Language in education ==
Under the 2015 Competence-Based Curriculum, Kinyarwanda was the language of learning in pre-primary and lower primary education, while English, French and Swahili were taught as language subjects. English was the language of learning from Primary 4 onwards. Following the December 2019 ministerial communiqué, English became the medium of instruction from Grade 1 in public and government-aided schools.

=== Teacher capacity and training ===
Government surveys around 2008–2009 indicated that many teachers had limited English proficiency; one account reported that about 85% of primary school teachers and 66% of secondary school teachers had only beginner, elementary or pre-intermediate English. In 2009, about 4,700 of Rwanda's roughly 31,000 primary school teachers and about 600 of its roughly 12,000 secondary school teachers had been trained in English. The Ministry of Education and partner organisations later introduced teacher-training programmes, including the Rwanda English in Action Programme.

== International dimension ==
Rwanda belongs to both the Organisation internationale de la Francophonie and the Commonwealth of Nations, reflecting its Francophone and Anglophone diplomatic links. It is also a member of the East African Community (EAC), a regional bloc that Rwanda joined in 2007.

== Debates and criticism ==
Rwanda's language policy choices have been the subject of academic and political debate. Critics of the 2008 shift to English argued that the transition was introduced without sufficient planning, funding, or teacher preparation, and that it disadvantaged many students and teachers. Some scholars also argued that the policy reinforced inequalities between an English-speaking elite and a largely Kinyarwanda-speaking population.

Scholars have linked the adoption of English to post-genocide identity politics and Rwanda's closer orientation towards East Africa and other Anglophone partners. Officials described the policy as a way to strengthen ties with English-speaking neighbours and improve access to trade, investment and international communication.

Some scholars have argued instead for an additive multilingual policy that would retain Kinyarwanda as a medium of instruction for longer while teaching other languages as additional subjects. They argue that mother-tongue instruction in the early years supports literacy development and the later acquisition of additional languages.

== See also ==
- Languages of Rwanda
- Kinyarwanda
- Rwandan English
- Education in Rwanda
- Constitution of Rwanda
- East African Community
