= List of schools in Rwanda =

This is a list of notable schools in the African country of Rwanda, organized by the provinces of Rwanda.

== Kigali City ==
- Green Hills Academy
- Ecole Francaise Antoine de Saint Exupery (French School)
- École Belge de Kigali
- International School of Kigali
- Kigali International Community School
- Excella School

== Northern Province ==
- Groupe Scolaire Marie Reine Rwaza
- Ecole des Sciences de Musanze

== Southern Province ==
- Ecole des Sciences Byimana
- Ecole des Sciences saint louis de montfort nyanza
- Groupe Scolaire Officiel de Butare (GSOB)
- College Maranatha
- Ecole Notre Dame De La Providence Karubanda (ENDPK)
- Groupe Scolaire Sainte Bernadette Save

== See also ==
- Education in Rwanda
- Lists of schools
