= .rw =

Internet country code top-level domain for Rwanda

- Introduced: 21 October 1996
- TLD type: Country code top-level domain
- Status: Active
- Registry: RICTA
- Sponsor: RICTA
- Intended use: Entities connected with Rwanda
- Actual use: Gets some use, mostly in Rwanda.
- Structure: Registrations are directly at second level
- Documents: Registrar agreement Policies
- Dispute policies: UDRP
- Registry website: RICTA

.rw is the Internet country code top-level domain (ccTLD) for Rwanda.

== Second-level domains ==
In addition to registering a Rwanda domain name directly under .rw, RICTA, through accredited and registered registrars, offers as well the following second level domains:

Second-level domain zones	Type of organization
.rw	None (any general purpose domain name)
.co.rw	Commercial and Business Organizations
.org.rw	Not-for-profit and/or Non-Government Organizations
.net.rw	Network Infrastructure Providers
.ac.rw	Rwanda Academic Institutions. Authorization must be issued by the Ministry of Education or the Rwanda Education Board
.gov.rw	Government of Rwanda Institutions. Authorization must be issued by the Office of The President.
.mil.rw	Reserved for the Rwanda Defense Forces
.coop.rw	Rwanda Cooperatives. Authorization must be issued by the Rwanda Cooperative Agency.
.ltd.rw	Rwanda Limited Companies. Authorization must be issued by the Rwanda Development Board

== History ==
The .rw country code top-level domain (ccTLD) for Rwanda was created around 1996. It was managed and operated under a Swiss company by a Belgian entrepreneur named Frédéric Grégoire. In 2005, the Rwanda Internet Community and Technology Alliance (RICTA) started a legal process to retain the domain name and operate it locally in Rwanda. They were finally able to achieve this in 2012.
