= Languages of Rwanda =

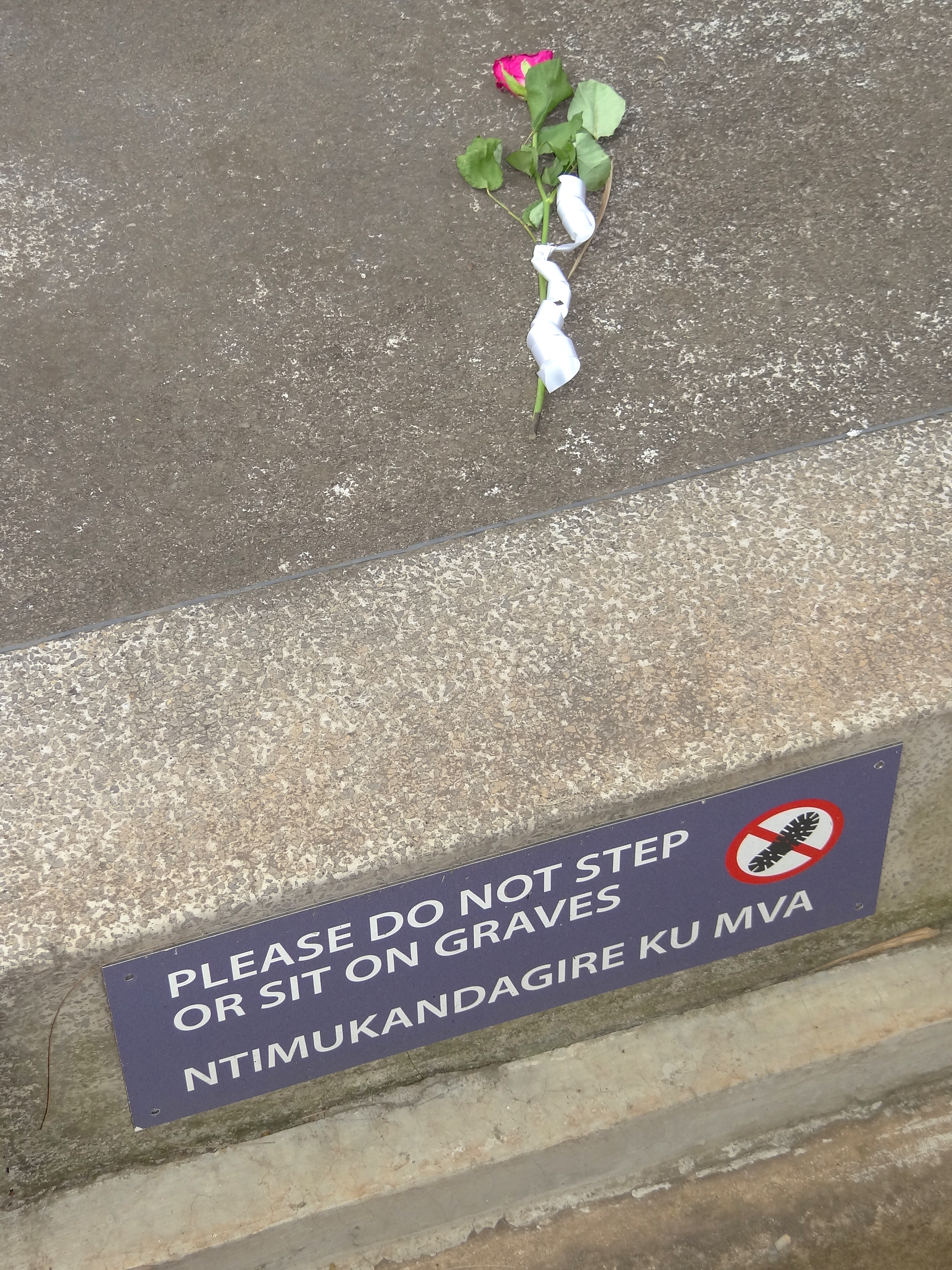
- Sign in English and Kinyarwanda in Kigali
- Official: Kinyarwanda, English, French, Swahili
- National: Kinyarwanda
- Main: Kinyarwanda (most spoken); English (working language)
- Vernacular: Kinyarwanda, Rwandan English
- Minority: Mashi
- Signed: Rwandan Sign Language
- Keyboard layout: QWERTY

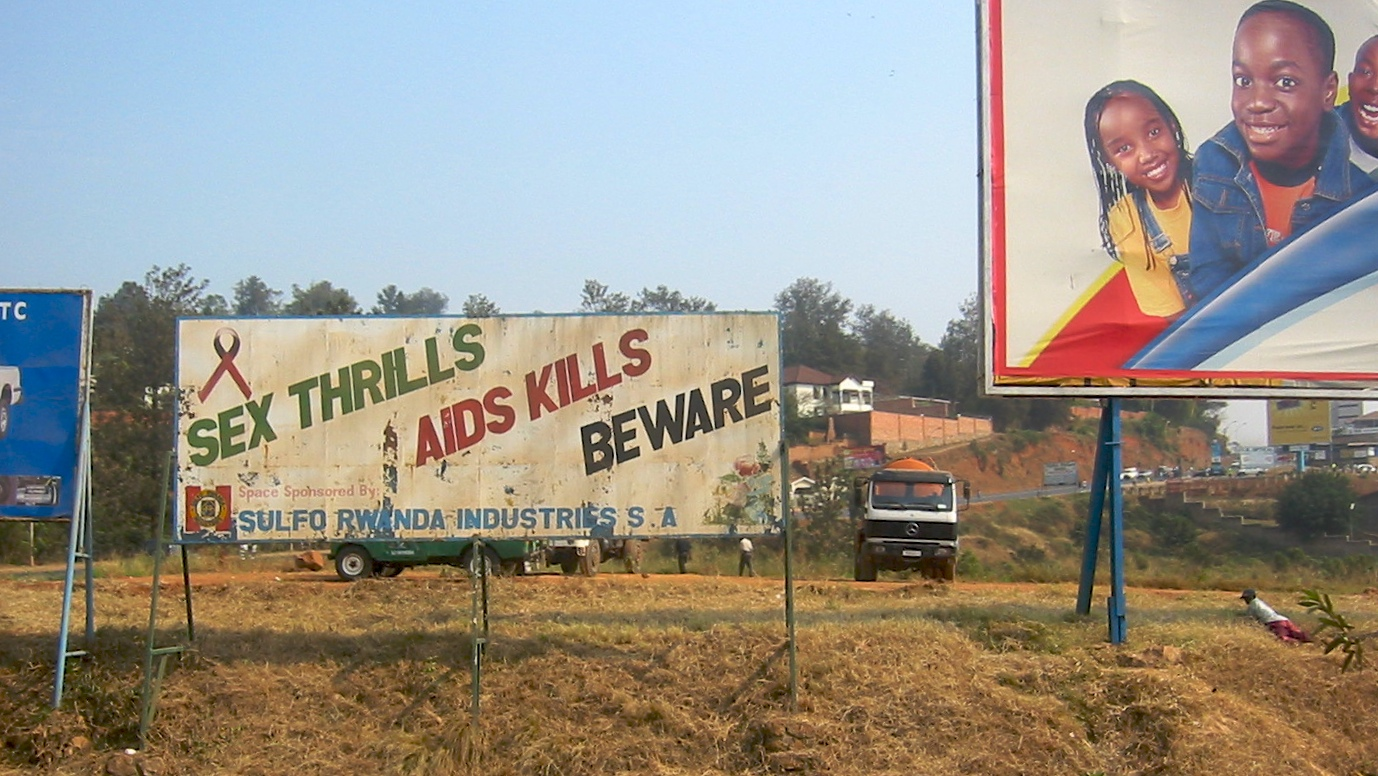
An anti-AIDS campaign poster in English, Rwanda

Rwanda has four official languages: Kinyarwanda, English, French, and Swahili. Kinyarwanda is the national language and is spoken by virtually the entire population. English is the sole medium of instruction from primary school through university and serves as the primary working language in government and business. French, which served as the main administrative language during the colonial period, is now used selectively, primarily among older generations and in Francophone-specific official communications. Swahili was adopted as an official language in 2017 to promote regional communication within the East African Community.

Although Rwanda recognises four official languages, Kinyarwanda and English function as the country's main languages. Kinyarwanda is used for everyday communication by nearly the entire population, while English is used for formal education, government administration, and business.

In addition to these official languages, Mashi is spoken by inhabitants of Nkombo Island on Lake Kivu, and Rwandan Sign Language is used by the deaf community.

According to the 2022 national census, 78.3% of residents aged 15 and above are literate in Kinyarwanda, 21.2% in English, 8.2% in French, and 4.0% in Swahili, with literacy rates substantially higher in Kigali across all languages.

== History ==
French was the language of administration from Rwanda's time under Belgian administration, between World War I and independence in 1962. Following the 1994 genocide, the complications of relations with successive French governments and the return of numerous refugees from anglophone neighbouring countries, primarily Uganda, but also Tanzania and Kenya, led to an increase in the use of English across the population and administration.

English was formally recognised as an official language in the 2003 constitution, alongside Kinyarwanda and French. 2008 then marked a decisive turning point: the government changed the medium of education from French to English, and in the same year English also became the working language of government and administration, displacing French from official domains.

On 8 February 2017, the Rwandan National Assembly adopted a law making Swahili the fourth official language of Rwanda, a move aimed at strengthening ties within the East African Community.

== Official languages ==
=== Kinyarwanda ===
Kinyarwanda is the national language of Rwanda and is spoken by virtually the entire population. A member of the Bantu language family, it serves as the principal medium of everyday communication across all regions and social groups, and is used in domestic media, religious services, and informal government interaction.

=== English ===
English has been an official language of Rwanda since 2003, when it was added to the constitution alongside Kinyarwanda and French. Following the 2008 policy change, English became the sole medium of instruction from primary school through university and was also adopted as the working language of government administration. It is used in government administration, commerce, higher education, and media. In 2009, Rwanda became the 54th member of the Commonwealth of Nations, the second country to join without prior constitutional ties to Britain.

As a member of the Commonwealth of Nations, Rwanda officially adheres to Commonwealth English (British English) conventions in education and government administration. The national curriculum, developed by the Rwanda Basic Education Board (REB), mandates standard British spelling and grammar (e.g., colour rather than color, centre rather than center).

=== French ===
French was introduced during the Belgian colonial period and served as the primary language of administration and education until 2008, when a Rwandan Cabinet resolution mandated the immediate replacement of French with English as the medium of instruction in schools following the national curriculum. French remains one of the four official languages of Rwanda under the 2003 constitution.

Although French retains its constitutional status as an official language, it is no longer a general working language of administration, education, or business. Since 2008, English has occupied those roles, and French use in official contexts is now limited to diplomacy and Francophone-specific communications.

Proficiency in French is concentrated in older generations. Rwandans who completed secondary or tertiary education before 2008 are more likely to have been educated in French, while those who completed it after 2008 were taught primarily in English.

=== Swahili ===
Swahili became Rwanda's fourth official language in February 2017. It is used in cross-border commerce, taught as a subject in schools, and serves as a practical lingua franca for trade and travel within the East African Community. Its official adoption was part of a broader regional integration strategy.

== Kinyarwanda and English as the main languages in practice ==
Although Rwanda has four official languages, two function as the country's main languages in everyday and institutional use: Kinyarwanda as the national language spoken by virtually the entire population, and English as the medium of instruction at all levels of education and the primary working language of government, business, and commerce.

Kinyarwanda is the national language of Rwanda under the 2003 constitution and is spoken by virtually the entire population. It is the principal medium of everyday communication, domestic media, religious services, and informal government interaction, and the only language with near-universal literacy in the country, recorded at 78.3% nationally and 89.9% in Kigali in the 2022 census.

English is the medium of instruction at all levels of Rwandan education, from lower primary through university, and is the principal working language of government administration, business, and higher learning. Its expanding reach is reflected in literacy data: between 2012 and 2022, English literacy rose from 14.7% to 21.2% nationally and from 29.0% to 41.0% in Kigali. English is also overwhelmingly dominant in Rwanda's formal online presence, accounting for over 96% of detected content on .rw websites.

The complementary roles of these two languages are widely recognised in academic and policy literature on Rwandan language planning, where the country is often described as operating under a Kinyarwanda–English bilingual framework.

Government communication practice reflects this bilingual framework. Official communiqués and public announcements from Rwandan government institutions, such as the Office of the Prime Minister and the Cabinet, are generally published in Kinyarwanda and English only, a practice followed by many other ministries and agencies.

== Minority languages ==
=== Mashi ===
Inhabitants of Rwanda's Nkombo Island speak Mashi. Mashi is the native language of the inhabitants of Nkombo Island on Lake Kivu. Its use on the island is a direct legacy of the region's historical affiliation with the Kingdom of Bushi.

Mashi is a distinct Bantu language, separate from Kinyarwanda. This linguistic autonomy is established by several facts:

- The language has its own ISO 639-3 code: job.
- Its phonology presents unique sounds and syllabic structures.
- Its lexicon contains fundamental differences in basic vocabulary.
- Its grammar, particularly the system of noun classes, is unique to it.

== Literacy and language use ==
=== National literacy (2012 and 2022 censuses) ===
The National Institute of Statistics of Rwanda (NISR) measures literacy by language among the resident population aged 15 years and above. The table below compares results from the 4th (2012) and 5th (2022) Population and Housing Censuses.

Rwanda – Literacy by language (national population aged 15+)
Language	2012 (%)	2022 (%)	Change (%)
Kinyarwanda	67.7	78.3	▲ +10.6
English	14.7	21.2	▲ +6.5
French	11.4	8.2	▼ −3.2
Swahili	–	4.0	–
Other	3.7	0.7	▼ −3.0
None	29.4	21.2	▼ −8.2

Note: Percentages may exceed 100% because individuals can have literacy in more than one language. Swahili was not reported separately in 2012.

Between 2012 and 2022, literacy increased in Kinyarwanda and English while French literacy declined, reflecting the 2008 switch to English-medium education and the growing reach of schooling across the population.

=== Kigali literacy (2012 and 2022 censuses) ===
Urban literacy rates in Kigali are substantially higher than the national average across all languages.

Kigali – Literacy by language (population aged 15+)
Language	2012 (%)	2022 (%)	Change (%)
Kinyarwanda	83.4	89.9	▲ +6.5
English	29.0	41.0	▲ +12.0
French	26.7	19.5	▼ −7.2
Swahili	–	11.7	–
Other	0.2	2.7	▲ +2.5

Note: Percentages may exceed 100% because individuals can have literacy in more than one language. Swahili was not reported separately in 2012.

The gap between English and French literacy in Kigali widened sharply between the two censuses: in 2012 the two languages were nearly equal, but by 2022 English literacy exceeded French by more than 20 percentage points.

=== The English–French asymmetry ===
The 2022 census reveals an asymmetric relationship between English and French as second languages of literacy in Rwanda, where Kinyarwanda is the near-universal first language.

Nationally, literacy rates are 21.2% for English and 8.2% for French. Rather than existing as separate demographics, these populations overlap heavily: most French-literate Rwandans are also English-literate, whereas the reverse is not true. The same asymmetry holds in Kigali, where overall foreign-language literacy is higher, but the imbalance is even more pronounced.

The table below compares English and French literacy only. Kinyarwanda literacy (78.3% nationally, 89.9% in Kigali) is the near-universal first language and is not part of this comparison.

Literacy in English and French (2022 census)
Literacy group	National	Kigali
Total literate in English	21.2%	41.0%
Total literate in French	8.2%	19.5%
Breakdown of overlap
— Literate in English, but not French	15.3%	25.4%
— Literate in both English and French	5.9%	15.6%
— Literate in French, but not English	2.3%	3.9%

The asymmetry is clearest when each language's literates are examined as a share of the other group. Nationally, of the 8.2% of the population literate in French, approximately 72% are also literate in English (accounting for 5.9% of the total population). This leaves only 2.3% of Rwandans literate in French but not in English. By contrast, of the 21.2% of the population literate in English, only about 28% are also literate in French. This leaves a significantly larger demographic, 15.3% of the national population, literate in English but not in French.

In Kigali, the asymmetry is even more pronounced. Of the 19.5% of residents literate in French, 80% are also literate in English (accounting for 15.6% of the city's population). This leaves only 3.9% of Kigali residents literate in French but not in English. Conversely, of the 41.0% of residents literate in English, only about 38% are also literate in French. This leaves 25.4% of the capital's population literate in English but not in French.

Consequently, French literacy in Rwanda almost always accompanies English literacy, whereas English literacy extends well beyond the French-literate population. This dynamic solidifies English's position as the dominant foreign language both nationally and in the capital.

=== Multilingual profiles ===
National multilingual breakdown (2022 Census)

Language literacy breakdown – National
Language(s) of Literacy	Percentage
Kinyarwanda	54.0%
Kinyarwanda & English	14.1%
Kinyarwanda, English & French	4.1%
Kinyarwanda & French	1.9%
Kinyarwanda, English, French & Swahili	1.5%
Kinyarwanda, English & Swahili	1.0%
Kinyarwanda & Swahili	0.7%
Kinyarwanda, French & Swahili	0.4%
Kinyarwanda, English, French, Swahili & Other	0.2%
Kinyarwanda & Other	0.1%
Kinyarwanda, English & Other	0.1%
Kinyarwanda, English, French & Other	0.1%
Kinyarwanda, English, Swahili & Other	0.1%
Other	0.1%
None	21.2%
Total	100%

Kigali multilingual breakdown (2022 Census)

Language literacy breakdown – Kigali
Language(s) of Literacy	Percentage
Kinyarwanda	46.5%
Kinyarwanda & English	21.6%
Kinyarwanda, English & French	9.6%
Kinyarwanda, English, French & Swahili	4.6%
Kinyarwanda, English & Swahili	2.5%
Kinyarwanda & French	2.5%
Kinyarwanda & Swahili	1.7%
Kinyarwanda, French & Swahili	1.2%
Kinyarwanda, English, French, Swahili & Other	0.8%
Kinyarwanda & Other	0.2%
English & Other	0.2%
Kinyarwanda, English & Other	0.4%
Kinyarwanda, English, French & Other	0.3%
Kinyarwanda, English, Swahili & Other	0.3%
English & French	0.1%
English & Swahili	0.1%
English, French & Swahili	0.1%
English, French & Other	0.1%
Kinyarwanda, Swahili & Other	0.1%
Kinyarwanda, French, Swahili & Other	0.1%
English, Swahili & Other	0.1%
French & Swahili	0.1%
None	6.5%
Not Stated	0.1%
Total	100%

== Digital and online presence ==
According to W3Techs (retrieved April 2026), English is the most common detected content language among websites using Rwanda’s .rw country-code top-level domain.

Languages used by .rw websites (W3Techs, April 2026)
Rank	Language	Share of .rw websites (%)
1	English	96.9
2	Kinyarwanda	2.0
3	French	1.1

This suggests that English is especially prominent in Rwanda’s formal web presence, although .rw websites represent only one part of Rwanda’s broader online ecosystem.

== See also ==
- Language policy in Rwanda
- Education in Rwanda
- Kinyarwanda
- Rwandan English
