= Rwanda's Access to Information Act =

The Rwanda Access to Information law (AIL) was written in October 2009 and put into effect with some revisions four years later, on February 8, 2013. The Prime Minister of Rwanda Paul Kagame ordered to publish the law in the official gazette on 11 March 2013, officially making the country the 11th country in Africa and 94th country globally to adopt an Access to Information law. The Rwanda AIL provides a comprehensive framework for access to information in Rwanda. The purpose of the law, as declared in Article 1, is to “enable the public and journalists to access information possessed by public organs and some private bodies.” The legislative project has been praised by Article 19, a British human rights organisation as one of the best access to information laws both in Africa and globally, and recognised by the Commonwealth Human Rights Initiative as “a signal of government’s intention to entrench transparency and enhance public participation in governance.”

== Main features ==
Rwandan access to information law goes to broaden the scope of the organs to which the law applies. Under Article 13, all private organs “whose activities are in connection with public interest, human rights and freedoms” have to comply with the Law. Article 15 then requires all private organs to appoint an information officer to deal with information requests from persons. Finally, Article 14 provides for a way for persons to access information in a private organ to which this Law does not apply.

Chapter IV, which deals with compliance with the Law by private organs, has been subject to some criticism. The human rights organization Article 19 has stated that the definition of a private body, provided in Article 2, is inconsistent with the above provisions in the Chapter IV.

An inclusion of a provision for improvement of the protection of whistleblowers has been labelled as progressive by the international community. Article 16 includes a prohibition to punish any person, who has disclosed information in the public interest.

Chapter III defines the procedures for accessing information. Any individual or a group of persons can apply for information with no fees required, except some postage and paper charges. The time for the provision of information is not provided in the Law, and is given to the liberty of a Ministerial Order. The request for information can be laid down in any of the constitutionally acknowledged languages and done by writing, verbally, telephone, internet or any other means of communication.

The Rwandan access to information law also provides for a broad list of exemptions where access to information can be restricted to material of “public interest.” Article 4 of the Rwandan AIL foresees that information is confidential when it may:

- destabilise national security;
- impede the enforcement of Law or justice;
- involve interference in the privy of an individual when it is not of public interest;
- violate the legitimate protection of trade secrets or other intellectual property rights protected by the Law;
- obstruct actual or contemplated legal proceedings against the management of public organ.

== Significance of the Rwanda access to information act ==
The Rwandan ACI is said to help promote transparency and more budgetary accountability within the country. The right to access of information is associated with democratic values within the country. Furthermore, the Law is expected to help journalists keep the public better informed, citizens gain more knowledge on their rights and students to conduct better research. While the law was seen as a positive step toward bettering access to information in the country, it has been criticized for its vague legal language as well as the law not being enforced effectively to protect information access. Article 19 and the UN backed Rwandan group The Legal Aid Forum have pushed to correct and extend the law to address these issues. According to the think tank Freedom House, Rwanda's Freedom of the Net ranking has been downgraded from partly free to not free in 2026.
