= MINEDUC =

MINEDUC may refer to:

- Ministry of Education (Chile)
- Ministry of Education (Rwanda)
