= Irere =

Irere may refer to:

- Irere, a common name for the white-faced whistling duck
- Irere (collection), a 2003 fashion collection by Alexander McQueen
- Irere Claudette, Rwandan politician
