= Rwanda Education Board =

Rwanda Education Board (REB)
Agency overview
- Formed: 2011
- Jurisdiction: Government of Rwanda
- Headquarters: Kigali; Rwanda
- Agency executive: Dr. Mbarushimana Nelson, Director General
- Parent agency: Ministry of Education (Rwanda)
- Website: http://reb.rw

Rwanda Education Board (REB) is Rwanda's national education assessment body.
