= LandNet Rwanda Chapter =

LandNet Rwanda Chapter is part of LandNet Africa and is a network of local Rwandan organizations and international NGO's which deals with land issues. The idea of LandNet Rwanda Chapter is to bring together academicians, policy makers and the civil society to discuss together about land issues. At the moment LandNet Rwanda is hosted by the Rwandan Initiative for Sustainable development (RISD)

== Launch ==
LandNet Rwanda Chapter was officially launched on 21 September 2000

== Land Situation in Rwanda ==
Rwanda is one of the poorest countries in Africa but has the highest population density of all African countries with about 370 persons/km2. The annual growth rate of Rwanda is very with 3.3% very high; the population is currently over 10 million and is expected to increase to about 13 million in 2020. Of these 10 million almost 90% are dependent on agriculture for their living, 93% of all women and 81% of all men. 80% of the land related disputes arise from community or family levels, most of the time one piece of land is claimed by multiple groups and 90% of these disputes affect vulnerable groups, like women, who are often discriminated in land disputes concerning for example inheritance cases.

== Work ==
Currently, the government of Rwanda is exercising a nationwide land reform called the Land Tenure Regularization Program (LTRP), which is aiming at addressing land related problems and ending gender based discrimination in land access. LandNet Rwanda Chapter is monitoring the LTRP and provides data through research for policy makers from which they can conclude the success of the LTRP. Also LandNet is reviewing existing laws and policies in order to improve them. LandNet Rwanda Chapter trains local leaders to be able to solve land disputes peacefully and fairly. LandNet Rwanda is organizing campaigns to inform the public about relevant land issues through sharing information among members and raising the concerns of the grassroots for advocacy and inclusion in the national policies.

== Members ==
Currently, LandNet Rwanda Chapter has 32 members. LandNet Rwanda Chapter differentiates between core members, which often attend LandNet Rwanda meetings and actively participate in the Network and members, which just wish to share experiences or ideas about land issues without being a core member.

Steering Committee Members:

- CARE International Rwanda
- Action Aid International Rwanda (AAIR)
- BENISHYAKA
- CLADHO
- COPORWA
- IMBARAGA
- Rural Environment and Development Organization (REDO)
- Rwandese Health Environment Project Initiative (RHEPI)
- Rwanda Initiative for Sustainable Development (RISD)
- UGAMA CSC

General Members:

- L' Association Rwandaise Pour la Défence des Droits de l’Homme (ARDHO)
- The Association Rwandaise des Ecologistes "ARECO - RWANDA NZIZA"
- Association des Volontaires de la Paix (AVP)
- CCOAIB
- Christian Aid Rwanda
- DUHAMIC-ADRI
- HAGURUKA
- INADES
- International Gorilla Conservation Programme
- The Institute for Policy Analysis and Research (IPAR)
- KANYARWANDA
- La Ligue Rwandaise pour la Promotion et la Defense des Droits de l'Homme (LIPRODHOR)
- National Unity and Reconciliation Commission
- National University of Rwanda (NUR)
- Office of the Ombudsman
- Oxfam Rwanda Programme
- REASON
- Reseaux Des Femmes
- Rwanda Women's Network
- Rwanda Rural Rehabilitation Initiative (RWARRI)
- SERUKA
- TROCAIRE Rwanda
