= Rwandan Sign Language =

Deaf sign language of Rwanda

- Native to: Rwanda
- Native speakers: 33,700 (2021)
- Language family: ?

Language codes
- ISO 639-3: rsn
- Glottolog: rwan1246

It is not clear what the sign language or languages are in Rwanda. In 2006, a dictionary project was started to standardize Rwandan Sign Language (Kinyarwanda: Amarenga y'Ikinyarwanda, lit. 'Kinyarwanda Sign Language' or Amarenga yo mu Rwanda, 'Sign Language of Rwanda') published in 2009.

However, the project was an incomplete effort, and an expanded dictionary, based on signs common throughout the country, was started in 2013. The latter project description implies that these are dialects of a single language, but that is uncertain. Interpreter programs are available in Uganda; it is unknown whether this means that Rwandan Sign Language is related to Ugandan Sign Language.
