= Rwandan English =

Variety of English spoken in Rwanda

- Icyongereza cy'u Rwanda
- Region: Rwanda
- Language family: Indo-European: Germanic; West Germanic; Ingvaeonic; Anglo-Frisian; Anglic; English; British English & African English; Rwandan English
- Early forms: Proto-Indo-European: Proto-Germanic; Old English; Middle English; Early Modern English; 19th century British English
- Writing system: Latin (English alphabet); Unified English Braille

Official status
- Official language in: Rwanda

Language codes
- ISO 639-3: –
- Glottolog: rwan1247
- IETF: en-RW

Rwandan English is the variety of English spoken in Rwanda. While it shares roots with the broader family of African Englishes and largely adheres to British English conventions, it has developed a unique identity. This has been shaped by the country's multilingual environment and the language's profound contact with Kinyarwanda.

== History ==
The modern development of English in Rwanda is closely associated with the post-1994 period. The return of Rwandans who had lived for extended periods in neighbouring Anglophone countries, particularly Uganda, increased the presence of English in public and institutional life and provided an important regional input for local English usage.

English subsequently expanded in domains such as education and administration, and descriptions of Rwanda's English place it within the wider East African English area, reflecting sustained regional contact and mobility.

Rwandan English is also described as a contact variety shaped by multilingual language use, with particular emphasis on the influence of Kinyarwanda alongside other languages present in Rwanda's linguistic environment.

== Phonology ==
Rwandan English is shaped by Rwanda's multilingual setting, especially contact with Kinyarwanda, and it shares broader areal tendencies with other East African English varieties.

=== Vowels ===
Descriptions of Rwandan English commonly note differences in vowel realisation when compared with RP. One overview characterises the variety as having fewer consistently maintained vowel contrasts, and gives examples in which vowels from the DRESS and FACE lexical sets may be realised similarly. The same source also notes reduced use of schwa-like vowel reduction in unstressed syllables, relative to RP.

=== Consonants ===
A common phonological feature among many Rwandan English speakers is the variable distinction between the liquid consonants /l/ and /r/. This tendency stems from Kinyarwanda phonology, which possesses only a single liquid phoneme (typically realised as the alveolar flap [ɾ]).

This feature is not used the same way by everyone or in every word. It is more likely to happen in specific positions, such as when the letter is between two vowels. Many speakers distinguish between the two sounds in very common words or in formal settings, while swapping them in casual conversation.

=== Phonological relationship with other varieties ===
Like other East African varieties of English, Rwandan English aligns more closely with non-rhotic varieties such as RP (or Standard British English) than with rhotic varieties such as North American English. Its consonant system is also shaped by the phonology of Kinyarwanda, which has a single liquid phoneme, typically realised as the alveolar flap [ɾ].

==== Rhoticity ====
As in RP and other East African varieties, /r/ in Rwandan English is generally pronounced only before a vowel, so that it is absent in words such as "card" and "floor", which are typically realised as [kad] and [flo]; where /r/ does occur, it may be rolled [r] or flapped [ɾ]. Interchanging /l/ and /r/ is not unique to Rwandan English. It is also widespread among other East African speakers of English whose first language is a Bantu language, although it is often stigmatised.

==== Realisation of intervocalic /t/ ====
Rwandan English speakers typically pronounce /t/ between vowels as a plosive [t], as in British English, in words such as "water", "city" and "litre". This contrasts with North American English, where /t/ in this position is usually flapped to [ɾ].

Because the Kinyarwanda liquid is itself realised as [ɾ], the North American flapped /t/ is phonetically close to a sound Rwandan speakers associate with /r/ or /l/, so that "water" may be heard as wara. Flapped /t/ has also been found to reduce intelligibility for non-native listeners of English more generally.

== Prosody ==
In prosody, research comparing Kinyarwanda and English spoken by Kinyarwanda first-language speakers has examined how information structure is expressed in speech. In one production study, focus and discourse givenness did not produce significant systematic differences in pitch (f0), intensity, or duration in the English materials analysed. The authors relate this pattern to cross-linguistic differences in prosodic organisation between Kinyarwanda and standardised varieties of English.

== Grammar ==
Rwandan English shares several grammatical features with the wider East African English variety. A common characteristic is the pluralisation of uncountable nouns; words such as "information", "advice", "equipment", and "software" are often treated as countable (e.g., "informations", "equipments"). Additionally, the use of articles (definite and indefinite) shows variation from Standard British English, with a tendency toward omission in contexts where they would otherwise be required.

== Spelling ==
Rwanda generally adheres to British English spelling conventions, reflecting the country's educational curriculum and inclusion in the Commonwealth of Nations. Common features include the use of –our instead of –or (e.g. "colour", "labour"), –re instead of –er (e.g. "metre", "centre"), –ogue instead of –og (e.g. "catalogue", "dialogue") and –ce instead of –se for nouns (e.g. "defence", "licence").

However, variation is increasingly observed in informal and digital contexts, where American English spellings (such as –ize instead of –ise or "program" instead of "programme") may appear, although British conventions remain the standard.

== Vocabulary ==
Rwandan English includes Rwanda-specific vocabulary and locally salient meanings, particularly in domains such as administration, education, and everyday social life. These patterns are typically discussed as outcomes of multilingual language use and local institutional contexts.

The core vocabulary of Rwandan English is derived from British English. Common examples are "chips" ("french fries" and "fries" in American English), "crisps" or "crips" ("chips" in American English) and "football" ("soccer" in American English). Due to the influence of the returnee diaspora, the lexicon shares significant overlap with Ugandan English, including the usage of "smart" to mean well-dressed or neat (rather than intelligent) and "balance" to refer to monetary change.

Rwandan English frequently incorporates loanwords from Kinyarwanda, particularly for concepts intrinsic to Rwandan culture and administration that lack precise English equivalents. Prominent examples include "Umuganda" (mandatory community service), "Imihigo" (performance contracts), and "Gacaca" (community justice system). In everyday speech, "moto" is universally used for motorcycle taxis, and "umuzungu" (plural: abazungu) refers to white people or foreigners of Western origin. Additionally, the variety retains a stratum of French vocabulary given the country's francophone history; terms such as "brochette" (skewered meat), "melange" (a buffet mix), and "quartier" (neighborhood) are common.

The variety also features direct translations and semantic shifts that reflect Kinyarwanda logic. A common greeting for an acquaintance who has not been seen for a long time is "you are lost" or "you have been lost" (mirroring the Kinyarwanda warabuze). Other usages include "to help" (often used specifically to mean giving someone a lift or ride), and the extension of kinship terms like "brother" and "sister" to refer to close friends.

== See also ==
- Commonwealth English
- African English
- Ugandan English
- Languages of Rwanda
- Language policy in Rwanda
