= Groupe Scolaire Marie Reine Rwaza =

- Musanze; Northern Province; Rwanda

Information
- Type: Public secondary school
- Motto: Discipline - Knowledge - Holiness
- Religious affiliation: Catholicism
- Founded: 1986; 40 years ago
- Oversight: Ruhengeri Catholic Diocese
- Headmaster: Fr Evariste Nsabimana
- Gender: Co-educational
- Website: mariereinerwaza.rw

Audio pronunciation of RWAZA Centre (Musanze City)

Groupe Scolaire Marie Reine Rwaza is a Catholic boarding secondary school, located in the Musanze District in the Northern Province of Rwanda. The school was established in 1986 and its motto is "Discipline, Knowledge and Holiness".

The school is located in Musanze District, sector Rwaza, precisely within Rwaza parish domain, at 12 kilometres (7.5 mi) from Musanze town, not far from Musanze-Kigali macadamized road.

== History ==
The school was formed in 1986 under the name “Groupe Scolaire Marie Reine APEDI Rwaza” by an association of people from the same region. The association was called “Association pour la Promotion de l’Education et le Développement Intégré-APEDI”. In 2011, the management changed and now the school is under the direction of the Ruhengeri Catholic Diocese.

== Campus ==
The campus has the capacity to host 750 boarding students. It contains: 18 classrooms, a library, a computer laboratory, a science laboratory, a refectory, multi-purpose hall, 5 dormitories, 2 Basketball and 3 Volleyball grounds, a Football ground.

== Organization and administration ==
Groupe Scolaire Marie Reine Rwaza is governed by priests and a board, both appointed by The Ruhengeri Catholic Diocese Bishop. The staff include: 1 Headmaster, 1 Bursar, 1 Head of Study, 1 Head of Discipline, 1 Secretary, 20 Teaching staff, 1 Lab Technician, 1 ICT Technician, 1 Librarian and 5 Supporting staff.

== Academics ==
Since its establishment in 1986, the school has delivered 1330 degrees.
