= Kigali International Community School =

International school in Kigali, Rwanda

Coordinates: 1°55′37.69″S 30°5′27.97″E

- Kigali, Rwanda

Information
- Type: Independent School
- Religious affiliation: Christian
- Established: 2006
- Grades: PreK-12
- Enrollment: 300+
- Information: +25 0783307282
- Director: Dr. Benjamin Thomas
- Website: http://www.kicsrw.org

Kigali International Community School (KICS) is a Christian, non-profit school, founded in 2006, which offers an educational program from PreK through grade 12. KICS affords children of all nationalities an education similar to that offered by schools in the USA.

KICS serves over 300 students from around 27 different nationalities and is a project of U.S. 501(c)3 ROC Partners.

KICS received two accreditations in 2012. One was from the Association of Christian schools International (ACSI) and the second was from the Middle States Association of Colleges and Schools (MSA).

Kigali International Community School is located at Caisse Sociale Estates, Gaculiro, BP 6558, Kigali, Rwanda. It has been an Association of Christian Schools International Continuous Member since 2007.

== History ==
The vision of Kigali International Community School (KICS) began in November 2005 as expatriate Christian families came together to seek answers for their children's educational needs. As these families prayed and planned a vision was formed around the key principles of an English medium school using an American curriculum with a distinctly Christian philosophy. KICS was primarily established to meet the educational needs of the families of evangelical missionaries and Christian cross-cultural workers. The founders of KICS envisioned it to primarily be a support ministry for these families whose children would be more easily able to eventually transition back into American schools. While KICS still prioritizes the children of missionaries and expatriate Christians it serves a diverse student body.

By January 2006 these families began several clusters of home school cooperatives. In September 2006 these clusters joined at a four-bedroom home of Food for the Hungry International (FHI) in Kacyiru. The founding board members at KICS were serving with the following organizations: Christ's Church in Rwanda (CCR), World Relief, Opportunity Bank, Food for the Hungry International (FHI), Compassion International, and a USAID funded project.

In November 2006, Rwanda Outreach Community Partners (ROC) was formed as 501c3 in the state of Oklahoma to purchase the Caisse Sociale school and hall located in the Vision 2020 Estate of Gaculiro on behalf of Christ's Church in Rwanda (CCR). The property was purchased in February 2007. ROC Partners invited KICS to move into the school property in April 2007 as a partner in Christian education with ROC and CCR. In order for KICS to be financially sustainable Food for the Hungry International moved their office to the ROC property and stayed until August 2008. FHI and ROC investments enabled KICS to be sustained through its early days as it transitioned to its new environment with a growing patronage. Teachers initially came as volunteers seconded to KICS from Food for the Hungry, World Relief, and Christ's Church in Rwanda.

As Kigali experienced a rapid growth of expatriate personnel the need for a quality international school grew and there became conflicting visions for KICS that led to the beginning of a transition in the spring of 2009. These conflicting visions ultimately led to a solidified Christian ethos and re-commitment to serving missionaries and Christian cross-cultural workers while honoring our host country with a substantial portion of the enrollment going to national families.

In September 2009 ROC Partners became the owner agency of KICS. This alignment of property and institutional ownership solidified KICS position as a legitimate institution in the eyes of KICS host nation. The KICS founding vision was also solidified by a renewable Memorandum of Understanding with Africa Inland Mission (AIM), and the merger of the former missionary home school coop, Jungle School, with KICS. AIM's partnership and the Jungle School/KICS merger are a demonstration of the philosophy of unity and partnership among Christians serving in Rwanda.

In August 2010 KICS began its self-study for ACSI/MSA accreditation that became effective January 1, 2012. As part of that process KICS completed the construction of a Media Center/Library and Science Laboratory in July 2012. This was phase II of a three-phase development plan. Phase I was completed in the summers of 2010 and 2011 through modifications of the Primary building. Phase three was the anticipated need for facilities expansion although not defined specifically at this time.

In 2013 KICS built a full-size basketball court giving it the potential to offer basketball and volleyball in addition to an already popular football program.

In 2015 KICS had its midterm accreditation visit with a positive report from accrediting institutions thanks to being ahead of schedule in KICS's Continuous School Improvement Plan. With KICS substantial institutional and academic growth it is poised to finish its first 7-year accreditation with high marks as it launches into the future.

In 2016 KICS began its vision toward capital expansion on the current compound and built a new classroom building in conjunction with the addition of a PK and duel streaming of students in KG and G7. This growth reflects KICS plans for continued growth and development that will impact generations.
