= Rwanda Initiative for Sustainable Development =

- Founded: 1997
- Type: NGO
- Location: Kigali, Rwanda
- Region served: Rwanda
- Website: http://risdrwanda.org/

Rwanda Initiative for Sustainable Development (RISD) is a Rwandan non-governmental, non-profit organization that mainly focuses on policy action oriented research and advocacy. In addition to the promotion of good land governance and the protection of land rights of the population especially for women and other vulnerable groups, RISD also plays an important role in the country and region in the promotion of the role of the civil society in sustainable development and policy engagement.

== Foundation of RISD ==
RISD was established in 1994 and began its operations in 1997 in Rwanda. It was founded by a group of Rwandan Professionals, with the idea to create an organization which can help to put Rwanda on a path to sustainable development by using a participatory and networking approach. In 2003 RISD obtained its legal personality as a non-profit making organization through the Ministerial Order No. 090/11 of the gazette of 28 August 2003.

== RISD’s Vision ==
The vision of RISD is to ensure equitable access to land resources, for sustainable peace, social justice and economic stability.

== RISD’s Mission ==
The mission of RISD is to promote, advocate and foster social and economic transformation by Rwandans themselves through sustainable use and protection of Natural Resources towards poverty reduction in an equitable and participatory manner.

== Land Situation in Rwanda ==
Rwanda is one of the poorest countries in Africa and has the highest population density of all African countries with about 444 inhabitants/km2. The population is currently over 10 million and is expected to increase to about 13 million in 2020. Land is the most important source of livelihood for most Rwandans, where 80% of the whole population is dependent on land, making land remain the base of Rwanda economy, hence, an important link to the politics of the country. From the social and cultural viewpoints, Rwandans are very attached to their land. From the political view point, it is believed that, the political economy of land in Rwanda contributed to socio-political tensions, leading to the 1994 genocide, due to the effects of resource capture by elite groups and landlessness in the economic collapse prior to 1994, in the context of structural land scarcity. To intervene in these challenges, the current government of Rwanda made the design of land reform a priority area, and is implementing a land reform through the Land Tenure Regularization Program (LTRP), which started under a pilot program in 2007, and was scaled-up nationwide in 2009 and is expected to be completed by end of 2013. The reform aims to address land-related disputes, end gender discrimination in land access and provide a framework for optimum land use as a key factor to contribute to sustainable peace and economic development in the country.

== Land Disputes ==
Today 80% of the land related disputes arise from community or family levels, most of the time one piece of land is claimed by multiple groups. 90% of these disputes affect vulnerable groups, especially women as the main users of land for their livelihood. Therefore, there is a need to monitor and document the legal rights of these vulnerable groups during the implementation of the LTRP.

== RISD’s Intervention ==
One of RISD’s primary bodies of work is to research the impacts of government policies on (rural) Rwandan society, with a special focus on land. RISD in particular is monitoring the impact of land reform on vulnerable groups, especially women, in relation to land claims and legal rights during the implementation of the LTRP. In 2008 RISD put in place its Land Dispute Management Program (LDMP), which aims to train local leaders so that they are able to solve land disputes in their own cells fairly and peacefully. Key activities include:

- Gender based research on natural resources and governance issues
- Training of local leaders in dispute management skills with a special focus on land related disputes
- Advocating for policies that protect the rights of the majority poor including women, widows, orphans and other vulnerable groups, that depend on land as their main source of livelihood
- Documenting the land related dispute backlogs during the Land registration process
- Promotion of the role of Civil Society engagement of national policies towards the achievement of Sustainable Development

The idea behind RISD is, that action oriented research, advocacy, networking, and empowerment of grassroots' movements will contribute to the sustainable and equitable use of natural resources for the benefit of all Rwandans and will embark on the achievement of the effective implementation of land policies, both in Rwanda and the African region. RISD argues that in order to improve the living conditions of Rwandans living in rural areas not only their resilience is needed, but governmental pro poor and natural resource policies play a vital role in this issue. The participation of ordinary citizens is a key factor for the success of RISD's sustainable development and poverty eradication.

== Networks and Cooperation ==
RISD maintains strong relationships and networking strategies with different partners, who include: local communities; local leaders; Rwanda Government Ministries; local and international NGOs; and diversified donors. These partnerships and networks exist at different levels: locally, nationally, regionally and at the international level. The main link of RISD partnership is the focus on the promotion of pro-poor policies and programs related to land and strengthening and promoting the role of civil society in sustainable development and policy engagement, which all are only possible through effective partnership and networks.

- LandNet Rwanda Chapter

The Rwanda Chapter of LandNet Africa was officially launched on 21 September 2000 and consists of 32 NGOs members at present. RISD is a founding member and the Chair of the Rwanda LandNet Chapter, a network that brings together policy makers, academics and civil society to work on land related issues.

- The International Land Coalition (ILC)

RISD is an active member of ILC since 2008, and has hosted the Africa node of the network between 2010 and 2013.

- ICCO Great lakes Synergy

This project was implemented in 2010 in three countries - Rwanda, Burundi and the Democratic Republic of Congo (DRC) - and is run on pilot basis by four civil society ICCO-partners: AAP and FOPAC from DRC, APDH from Burundi and RISD from Rwanda. The general objective of this regional synergy is to contribute to the regional data on the land rights situation of the vulnerable, including challenges and suggested strategies of intervention, towards putting in place a common understanding of the land rights of the vulnerable in the sub-region of the African Great Lakes.
