= Joseph Nsengimana =

Rwandan politician

Joseph Nsengimana is a Rwandan engineer and politician. In September 2024, he was nominated as the country's Minister of Education, replacing Gaspard Twagirayezu, who has been appointed to lead the Rwanda Space Agency.

== Education ==
Nsengimana holds a bachelor's degree and master's degree in electrical engineering from Brigham Young University in the U.S.

== Career ==
From 2008 to 2012, Nsengimana was based in Johannesburg, South Africa where he led a team at Intel responsible for government affairs, ICT and broadband policies. During Nsengimana's long career at Intel, he was the executive director of global diversity and inclusion. He was responsible for implementing all pathway development initiatives funded through the US$300,000,000 Diversity in Technology fund that Intel established in 2015.

More recently, Nsengimana served as director at the Mastercard Foundation Centre for Innovative Teaching and Learning.

In his 2024 inauguration and swearing in ceremony as Minister of Education, Nsengimana was tasked to advance the education system by the president of Rwanda.
