= Education in Rwanda =

Ministry of Education
- Ministers and Ministers of State: List: Valentine Uwamariya - Minister of Education; Gaspard Twagirayezu - Minister of State in Charge of Primary and Secondary Education; Claudette Irere - Minister of State in Charge of ICT and TVET (technical and vocational education and training)

National education budget (2020/2021)
- Budget: 492 billion RWF

General details
- Primary languages: English
- System type: National

Literacy (2022)
- Total: 79%
- Male: 81%
- Female: 77%
- ‡ Includes Elementary, secondary and post-secondary non-tertiary education.

Education in Rwanda has undergone considerable changes throughout Rwanda's recent history, and has faced major disruptions due to periods of conflict. Education was divided by gender whereby women and men had a different education relevant to their responsibilities in day-to-day life. Women were mostly taught housekeeping while men were mainly taught how to hunt, raise animals, and fish. This is because Rwanda was a community-based society where every member had a specific contribution to the overall development of the community. Older family members like grandparents usually took on the role of educators.

Despite improvements to education and literacy as part of the country's rebuilding after the 1994 genocide, the education system still faces challenges including low school enrolment rates and limited resources. The education system is overseen by the Ministry of Education.

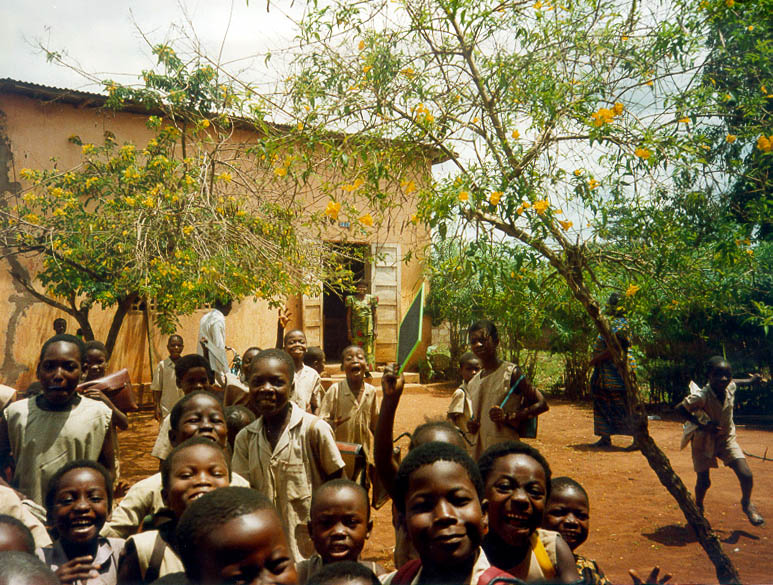
Schoolchildren in Rwanda

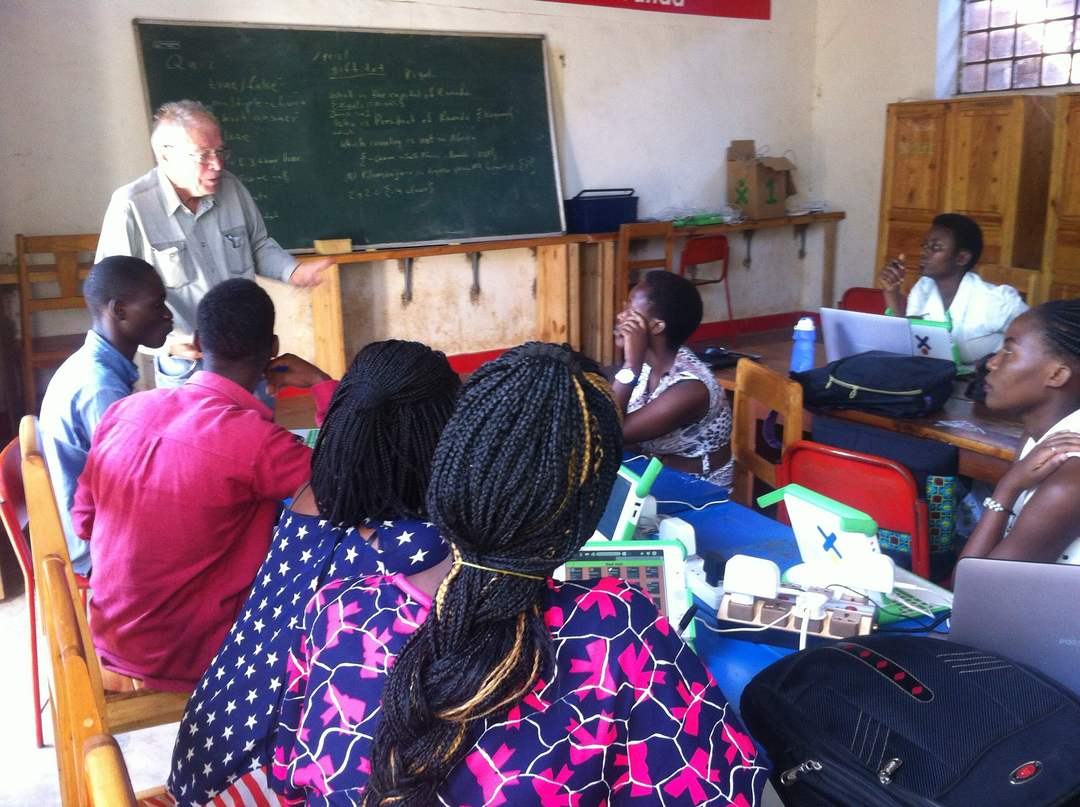
2018-03-23 OLPC training Rwanda

The Human Rights Measurement Initiative (HRMI) finds that Rwanda is fulfilling only 73.1 percent of what it should be fulfilling for the right to education based on the country's level of income. HRMI breaks down the right to education by looking at the rights to both primary education and secondary education. While taking into consideration Rwanda's income level, the nation is achieving 94.7 percent of what should be possible based on its resources (income) for primary education but only 51.6% for secondary education.

== History of Rwandan education ==
=== Prior to 1900 ===
In Rwanda, education was informal and delivered largely through the family. Training was also delivered through Amatorero training schools. These courses included the military and war skills, iron smith and foundry, poetry, basket making.

=== 1900 to 1960 ===
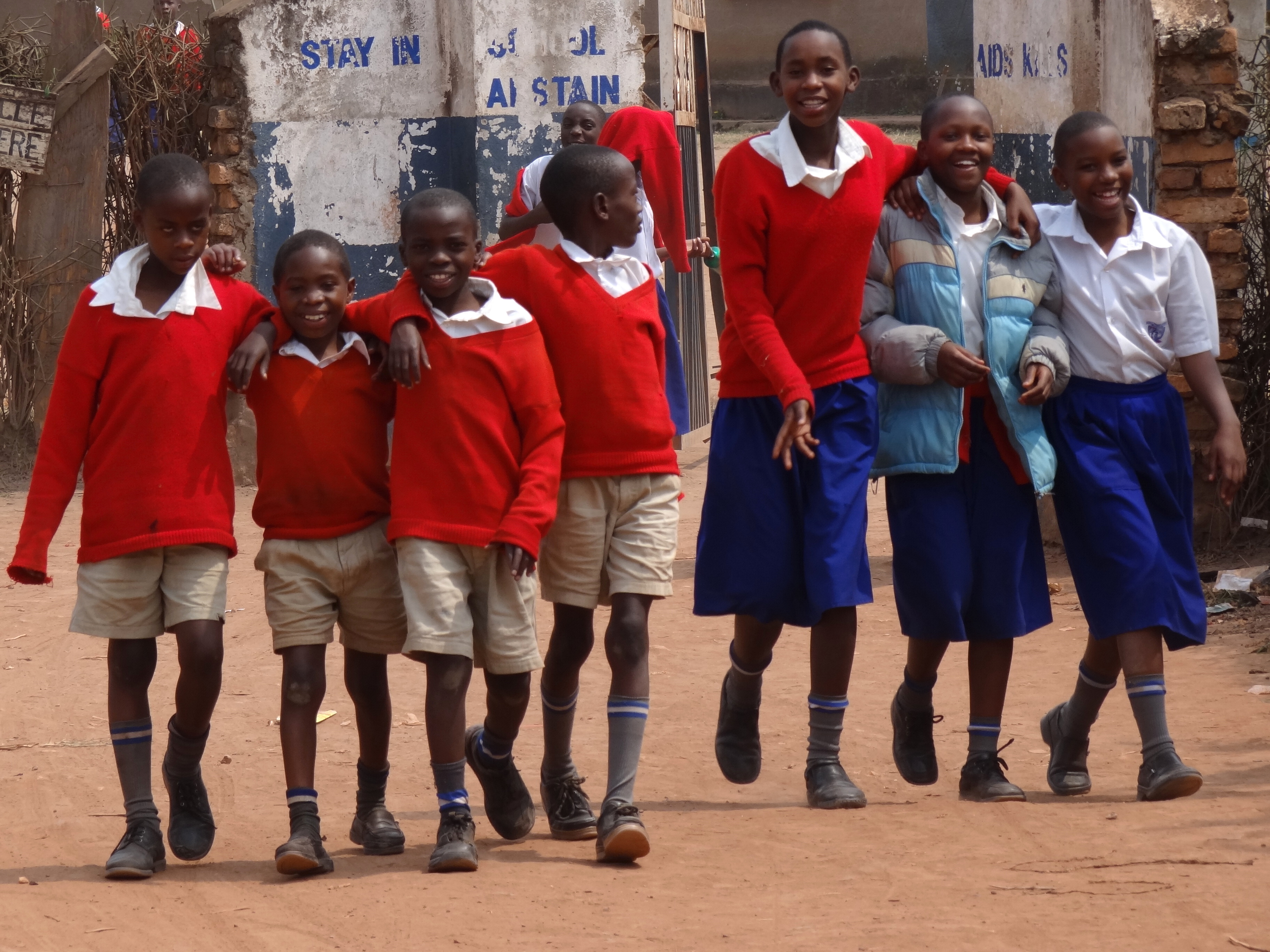
Education in Rwanda

Belgium created a plan to provide elementary school to as many children as possible from World War I to World War II, under a League of Nations mandate. The majority of schools were run by religious organisations and received government support if they followed the Belgian curriculum and other rules. A Belgian census of 1933 led to the measurement and the classification of the population along racial and ethnic lines. Tutsis were given access to the best education at the prestigious Astrida Secondary School and groomed for colonial administrative jobs, ethnic tensions grew as a result. Hutus were often used as forced labor and many migrated to surrounding countries. The tensions grew up until 1959 when civil war broke out and many Tutsis were killed. Others went into exile.

=== 1960 to 1994 ===
After Rwanda's independence, the focus was on restructuring of the education system and the development of a national curriculum. The main goal was to reach more Rwandan children and in particular to improve access to schooling in rural areas. A national curriculum and double shifting were introduced in 1966. From 1977 on, primary school was eight years of education in Kinyarwanda, while three years of post-primary and secondary education were taught in French.

=== 1994 to 2012 ===
Post-genocide years focused on human capital rebuilding and increasing enrolment rates. 1996 saw the introduction of 6-year primary, 3-year lower secondary, and 3-year upper secondary education, where Kinyarwanda was the language of teaching up to 6-year primary, whereas lower and upper secondary, which changed to French and English.

In 2006, The 4th Education Sector Strategic Plan (ESSP 2006–2010) introduced fee-free schooling for 9YBE - 9 Year Basic Education - including primary and lower secondary. While enrolment rates have gone up, school related costs remain a barrier for many.

In 2008, in an effort to stimulate Rwanda's integration with the East African Community (EAC), English was adopted as the national teaching language.

Several new authorities were created:

- The Workforce Development Authority (WDA) was created in 2008 to address the growing need for better, more, and more demand-driven policy for technical and vocational training.
- The Rwanda Education Board (REB), established in 2011, became the implementing agency for general education: giving education policy input on sciences, coordinating implementation of education programs, overseeing curriculum development, education standards, national examinations for sciences, etc.

=== 2012 to 2016 ===
Since 2012, under the new Education Sector Strategic Plan (ESSP 2013–2015), focus has shifted from increasing 9YBE access and enrollment to improving quality and relevance of schooling as well as increasing access to secondary level schooling with the introduction of the 12 Year Basic Education (12YBE) policy, making schooling fee-free up to upper secondary.

In 2015, the Government of Rwanda introduced a new language-in-education policy that designated Kinyarwanda as the medium of instruction for the first three years of primary school (P1–P3), while English was to be used from Primary 4 onward and throughout secondary and tertiary education. This change aimed to strengthen early literacy in the mother tongue before transitioning to English for higher grades.

=== 2019 to present ===
In December 2019, the Government of Rwanda revised its language-in-education policy, declaring that English would be used as the medium of instruction at all levels of education, including in lower primary (P1–P3). This marked a reversal of the 2015 policy that had reintroduced Kinyarwanda as the teaching language for the first three years of primary education. The directive was issued by the Ministry of Education through an official communiqué on 2 December 2019.

As a member of the Commonwealth of Nations, Rwanda officially adheres to Commonwealth English (British English) conventions in education. The national curriculum, developed by the Rwanda Basic Education Board (REB), mandates standard British spelling and grammar (e.g., colour rather than color, centre rather than center).

== Ministry of Education ==
As at 2024, Hon. Gaspard Twagirayezu is the Minister of Education; he replaced Dr Valentine Uwamariya in 2024. The Ministry's website details it responsibilities, functions and key personnel; it provides a mission statement saying:

The general mission of the Ministry of Education shall be to transform the Rwandan citizen into skilled human capital for socio-economic development of the country by ensuring equitable access to quality education focusing on combating illiteracy, promotion of science and technology, critical thinking and positive values.

— Ministry of Education (MINEDUC) website (2023)

== Education Finance ==
Education accounts for fifteen percent of the national budget, of which 9.5 percent is allotted to Higher education.

In 2003 the state's total expenditure on education was 48 billion Rwandan Francs (£48.6 million or $86m).

Between 1996 and 2001 total public spending rose from 3.2 percent to 5.5 percent. However much of this was channeled into Secondary and Tertiary education at the expense of Primary education.

== Standards in education ==
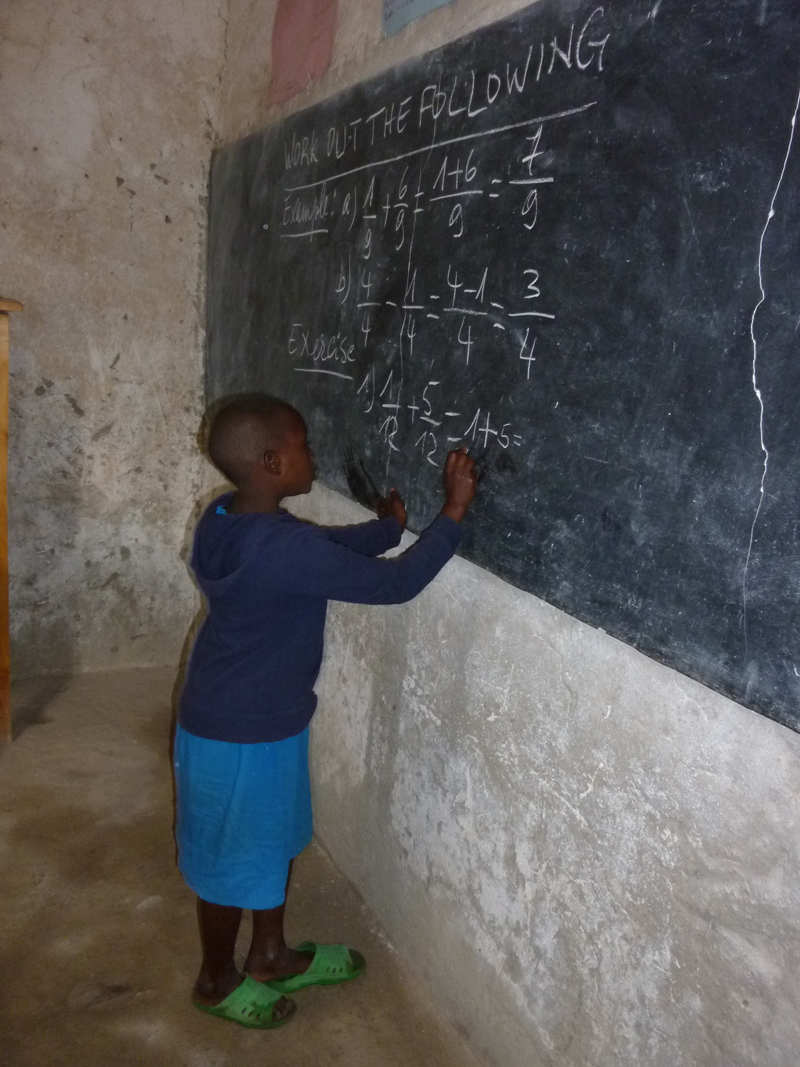
Classroom in Mpushi

The following bodies oversee educational standards, having responsibility for the specific areas shown.

Division of Construction and Equipment:	Sets standards for classroom/school construction.
National Examination Council:	Sets standards for grades and progression to the next stage of education.
Department of Planning:	Sets and monitors standards on system performance indicators.
General Inspectorate of Education:	Inspects and advises on standards adherence and compliance.

== ICT in education ==
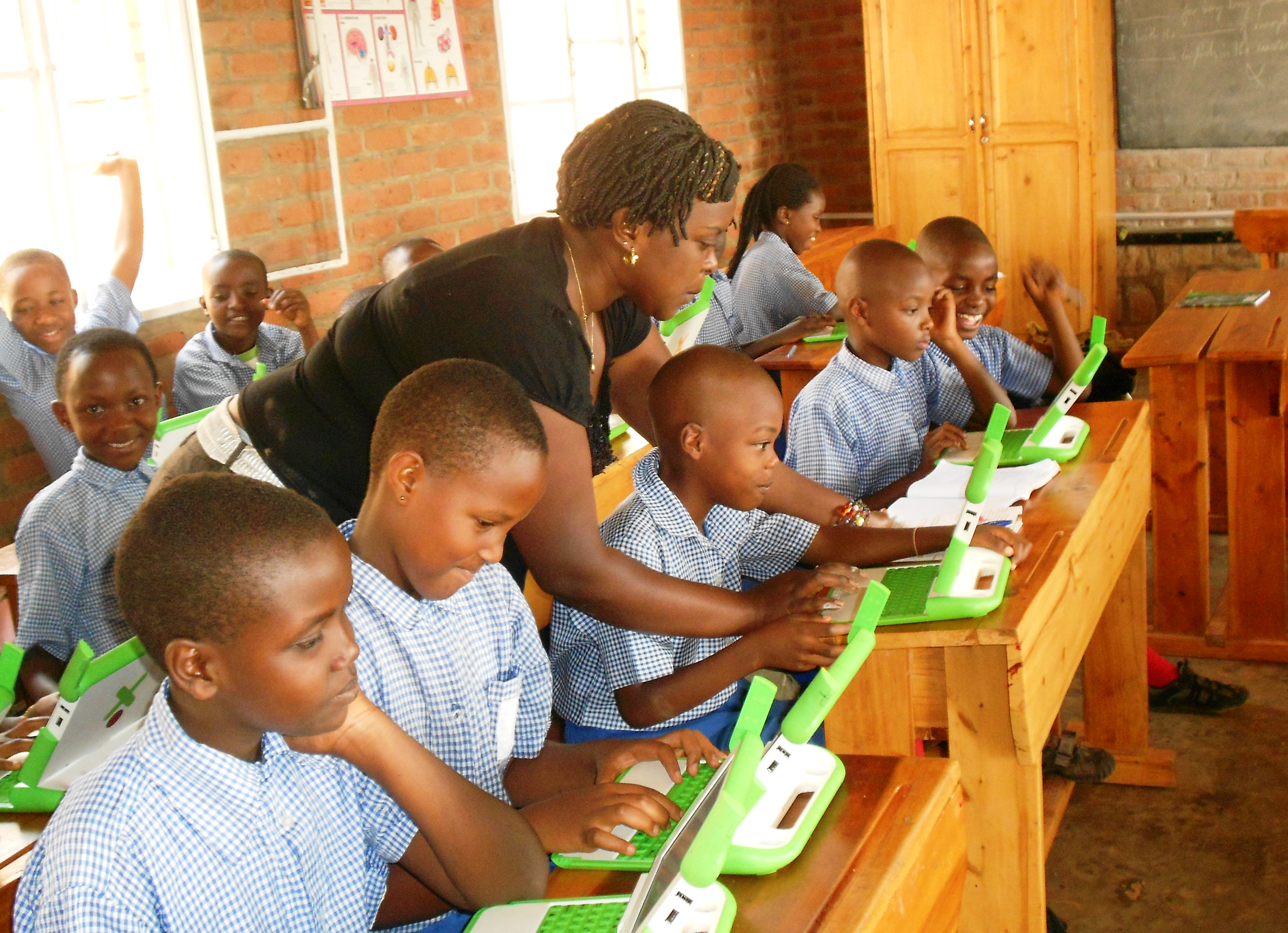
OLPC classroom teaching in Primary school

The Rwandan government has formed a national strategy for information and communications technology (ICT). This is co-ordinated by the Rwanda Information Technology Authority (RITA) which was designed to serve as the national body to support the development and the implementation of the National Information and Communications Infrastructure in the public and private sectors.

The Ministry of Education (MINEDUC) is active in promoting the use of ICT in schools and is co-ordinating the One Laptop Per Child project in the country.

Although there is a shortage of ICT skills and technical support at the present time, ICT education is extending from tertiary institutions to all primary and secondary schools. This training is already paying dividends, with many students now being offered well paid (by local standards) part-time work. Rwanda could attract business through the bilingual French and English skills many locals have.

The Rwanda Education Commons (REC) is a four-year program funded by USAID to promote the effective use of ICTs in education. Since REC opened its office within MINEDUC in January 2009, it has worked to expand teachers' access to quality resources, to connect educators with each other, and to inspire and empower teachers. REC has a record of achieving its goals and a reputation as a practical and effective partner in assisting Rwanda to achieve its ICT in education goals. REC designed an education online platform www.educationcommons.rw This online community includes a digital library of high-quality resources aligned to the curriculum, discussion boards, social networking tools, and informational areas. More than 1,630 teachers have registered for the portal and they are regularly using it.

Some students have been studying through the African Virtual University which is allowing students to learn online while being taught by lecturers from other countries.

In October 2006, the NEPAD e-Africa Commission launched a project to further develop ICT in Rwandan schools. The project will link up schools across Africa, including primary and secondary levels, and is intended to grow; eventually it will incorporate all Rwandan secondary schools.

Two institutions are heavily involved in ICT education - KIST (Kigali Institute of Science and Technology) and KIE (Kigali Institute of Education).

Since 2005, KIE has been involved in an ICT in education initiative as part of the larger EdQual project, funded by the UK Department for International Development DfID and involving four African partner countries. The EdQual initiative in Rwanda has been working with teachers in twelve primary and secondary schools in Rwanda. Through a programme of workshops and activities in schools, teachers have been developing their own ICT skills and using ICT to support teaching and learning of science and mathematics. Another small-scale EdQual project study has compared NEPAD e-Schools in Rwanda and Kenya.

== Literacy Rate ==
The country's literacy rate, defined as those aged 15 or over who can read and write, was 71 percent in 2009, up from 38 percent in 1978 and 58 percent in 1991.

== Education Issues in Rwanda ==
The level of education one has is often seen as a form of capital accumulation which helps in countries' development. In Rwanda, the government implemented policies over the years to ensure there is a high literacy rate among the population. As of 2004–2008, 77 percent of males and females are literate, which is a relatively high percentage, however, those who continue into secondary schooling stands at a low 31 percent. Nevertheless, the Ministry of Education (MINEDUC) can be seen as partially successful in getting the young to receive schooling.

The education level, in Rwanda, remains low despite implementation of the policies such as mandatory education for primary school (six years) and lower secondary schooling (three years) that is run by state schools. The children are not required to pay school fees for the mandatory schooling. A Rwandan is expected to complete an average of 10.6 years of education. However, the mean number of years that a Rwandan spends on education is 3.3 years, which is lower than the expectation. It is also lower than the average years of schooling in developed countries and Sub-Saharan Africa, which are 10.0 years and 4.5 years respectively. Based on the 2010 Human Development Index (HDI) report, Rwanda is ranked at 152 out of a total of 169 countries under the 'Low Human Development' category.

The number of Rwandans admitted into schools has increased between 2001 and 2008, but the facilities and resources have not increased at the same rate. Enrollment in primary school almost doubled over the decade, with an average annual growth rate of 5.4 percent between 1998 and 2009, to reach almost 2.2 million students in 2008. However, enrollment growth slowed in 2007–2008 with a total increase of only 40,000 students, compared to an increase of 160,000 students in 2005/06. Surprisingly, no significant increase is apparent following the implementation of the fee-free primary education policy in 2003/04, implying that factors other than school fees play a role in the decision to send a child to school. In 2008, around 71 primary level pupils are taught in a single classroom and within the secondary school level for Rwandans, around five students shared one textbook on average. An average primary school teacher has to handle around 62 students as the class size increases at a faster rate as compared to the number of teachers employed. The schools in the more remote rural areas also find it tough to attract teachers. The constraints are aggravated by the fact that supplementary reading materials were inadequate, particularly for the lower primary school grades.

1. textbook distribution is heavily dependent on the availability of funds, which affects the government's ability to conduct adequate planning, and may not effectively respond to supply and demand
2. the evaluation of textbook publishing bids often take a long time
3. teachers feel that they are insufficiently involved in the textbook selection process
4. textbooks may be damaged because of poor distribution and stock management

These factors result in discrepancies in pupil to textbook ratios between schools and within districts. This goes to show that there is still a challenge in terms of access and high-quality textbooks in Rwanda which are expected to be addressed in upcoming plans.

About forty percent of the teacher's population in Rwanda have less than five years of teaching experience. The number of teachers who are qualified in the primary school have increased to 99 percent in 2008, however, the number of teachers who are qualified in the secondary school are only 36 percent and 33 percent for lower and upper secondary respectively. This means that Rwanda is not able to produce a highly skilled workforce, especially when considering the large proportion of teachers who are not qualified to teach the secondary school pupils.

Most teachers felt that they have been poorly paid. As a result, only ten percent of the total teacher respondents have undergone qualification upgrading to attain higher qualifications for teaching in Rwanda. Most of the secondary school teachers are studying for a higher qualification that is not for teaching. This shows that the incentive for further education is low and there are other jobs that have a higher benefit as compared to teaching in Rwanda. Overall, the lack of quality in the education system, such as the standards of the teachers, lack of facilities and resources makes schooling unattractive.

== Primary schools ==
The language of instruction in primary schools is English, while Kinyarwanda is taught as a subject.

French, which had been the language of instruction until 2008, was officially replaced by English after a cabinet decision that year.

However, French classes were reintroduced weekly in primary schools, since 2016.

Statistics since 2003:

Year:	2002-3	2007	2011	2015
# of Schools	2,172	2,370	2,543	2,752
# of Pupils	1,636,563	2,150,430	2,341,146	2,450,705
# of Teachers	26,024	31,037	40,299	42,005
% of Qualified Teachers	85.2%	98.1%	98.6%	93.9%
Pupils per teacher	62.9	69.3	58.1	58.3
Gross enrolment ratio (GER)	100.0%	151.9%	127.3%	135.3%
Net enrolment rate (NER)	82.7%	95.8%	95.9%	96.9%

Despite some major achievements in Rwanda's attempts to achieve universal primary education, it currently has one of the worst repetition rates in the sub-saharan region.

At the end of primary schooling, students take the Primary Leaving Certificate (PLE).

== Secondary schools ==
The teaching language is English.

Statistics, since 2007:

Year:	2007	2011	2015
# of Schools	643	1,362	1,543
# of Pupils	266,518	486,437	543,936
# of Teachers	12,103	20,522	27,644
% of Qualified Teachers	53.4%	64.4%	67.9%
Pupils per teacher	22.0	23.7	19.7
Gross enrolment ratio (GER)	20.5%	35.5%	38.0%
Net enrolment rate (NER)	13.1%	25.7%	28.3%

Secondary schooling is divided in Lower Secondary and Upper Secondary, both lasting three years. Lower Secondary, like primary, focuses on acquiring basic knowledge and skills. Together with primary, it constitutes 9YBE – 9 Year Basic Education. At the end of these three years, students take O-Level national examinations which allows them to progress Upper Secondary public schools. Many also continue into the TVET system - Technical and Vocation Education and Training.

Starting from Upper Secondary, students enter specific tracks:

- General Secondary Schooling (GSS): academic-style education, often as preparation for higher education, where students specialize in either Sciences, Humanities, or Languages and take A-Level national examinations.
- Technical Secondary Schooling (TSS): technical training leading to A2 level certification. Under EDPRS II development of technical and vocational skills training was identified as crucial to stimulate Rwandan economic growth.
- Teacher training colleges (TTCs): Students in this track are trained to become primary school teachers (though some also continue studies in higher education). For sixteen TTCs, curriculum development, assessment and certification is the responsibility of the University of Rwanda's College of Education (UR-CE).

Number of students and gender balance in 2015:

	# of students	% Female
Lower Secondary	336,442	53.5%
Upper Secondary - General (GSS)	131,267	55.0%
Upper Secondary - Technical (TSS)	67,456	44.7%
Upper Secondary - Teacher (TTC)	8,771	55.8%

== Higher education ==
By 2016, there were 45 tertiary education institutions in Rwanda, ten of them public and 35 private. The first university in Rwanda, the National University of Rwanda (NUR now part of University of Rwanda), was opened by the government in 1963, with 49 students. By the 1999–2000 academic year, this had risen to 4,550. In 1997-1998 Rwanda had a total of 5,571 students enrolled in higher education. Today this stands at 26,796, of which 39 percent are female.

Rwanda Polytechnic (RP) was established in 2017 as a public higher learning institution in Rwanda specializing in technical and vocational education and training. Its mandate covers three main areas: education and training, research and innovation, and community engagement. Rwanda Polytechnic comprises eight colleges and ten campuses located across the country. It offers technical and vocational higher education through competency-based and industry-oriented programmes, combining practical training with applied research, innovation, entrepreneurship and community engagement. Its programmes are designed to equip students with technical and professional skills relevant to the labour market and to support their participation in economic and social development. 70% of RP graduates secure employment or establish their own ventures within six months of graduation.

Throughout the higher education system, some hundred PhDs are held, the bulk of them at NUR. Areas of research include agriculture, livestock, and the training of farm managers. A system of universités du soir (night school universities) has been established to widen access to university. However, there has been some debate over the quality of the courses offered.

Rwanda's higher education sector has some way to go in developing the internal efficiency. In 2000–2001, final year students were graduating with a success rate of between 11 and 50 percent. Across all years, this success rate is 53 to 76 percent.

The main higher learning institutions in Rwanda are:

- University of Rwanda, which in turn comprises six colleges:
  - University of Rwanda - College of Science and Technology (formerly known as Kigali Institute of Science and Technology)
  - University of Rwanda - College of Education (formerly known as Kigali Institute of Education )
  - University of Rwanda - College of Medicine and Health Sciences (formerly known as Kigali Health Institute)
  - University of Rwanda - College of Business and Economics (formerly known as School of Finance and Banking)
  - University of Rwanda - College of Agriculture, Animal Sciences and Veterinary Medicine (formerly known as ISAE Busogo)
  - University of Rwanda - College of Arts and Social Sciences (formerly known as National University of Rwanda)
  - Rwanda Teachers College (RTC)
- African Leadership University
- Rwanda Polytechnic (RP)
- Institute of Legal Practice and Development (ILPD)
- Private Higher Learning Institutions
- Catholic Institute of Kabgayi (ICK)
- Kigali Independent University (ULK)
- Institut d'Agriculture, de Technologie et d'Education de Kibungo (INATEK)
- Institut Laique adventiste de Kigali (INILAK)
- Adventist University of Central and East Africa (AUCA)
- Institute of Applied Sciences Ruhengeri (INES)
- Catholic University of Rwanda (CUR)
- KIM University (formerly Kigali Institute of Management)
- Byumba Polytechnic (IPB)
- Kibogora Polytechnic (KP)
- Protestant Institute of Arts & Social Sciences (PIASS)]
- University of Tourism, Technology and Business Studies (UTB)]
- Mount Kenya University Kigali Campus (MKU Kigali)
- Kigali Health Institute, higher institute of agriculture and animal husbandry (ISAE)
- Akilah Institute for Women

== See also ==
- List of schools in Rwanda
