= Irere Claudette =

Rwandan politician

Irere Claudette is a Rwandan technology professional and politician, who was appointed the Minister of State in charge of ICT and Technical Vocational Education and Training by President of Rwanda Paul Kagame in February 2020. This position has been reinstated as the Government moves to streamline and strengthen TVET Education and ICT integration in teaching and learning.

== Background and education ==
Minister Claudette got her secondary school certificate from FAWE Girls' School, Rwanda. She furthered her education and earned a bachelor's degree in Computer Science and Systems in 2012 from the National University of Rwanda. Thereafter in 2013, she got a scholarship to study Masters Programme and obtained her master's of science and engineering degree in Computer Engineering from the Oklahoma Christian University in United States.

== Career before politics ==
Before joining the Ministry, Irere Claudette was among Rwandan females spearheading the Rwanda's IT development and She leads the KLab where digital specialists in the capital of Kigali collaborate on new innovations. Prior to that, She was the co-founder and managing director of the first Fabrication Laboratory called FabLab Rwanda. FabLab was an extension wing of the knowledge lab called KLab. FabLab Rwanda is the first digital fabrication lab of Kigali derived from the global FabLabs concept of MIT's Center for Bits and Atoms (CBA). Fab labs provide widespread access to modern means for invention and in Rwanda, the FabLab is the first of its kind providing 3D prototyping facilities and space for the community to acquire modern technology skills. Irere, who co-founded FabLab Rwanda and once served as its general-manager, previously served as project manager at PSF-ICT Chamber, general-manager at Klab, and manager of ICT projects at Transform Africa. Irere Claudette was a member of Girls in ICT Rwanda, an organization of professional women in Technology that strives to empower and encourage young Girls to join Science, Technology, Engineering and Mathematics (STEM) career paths at earlier age.

== As a politician ==
October 19, 2018, Irere was appointed as the Permanent Secretary (PS) in the Ministry of ICT and Innovation as she joined the reshuffled cabinet of President Paul Kagame who reduced the members of cabinet from 31 to 26. The cabinet is 50 percent women; making Rwanda, and Ethiopia, the only two African countries with gender equality in their governments. She was one among the youngest members of cabinet who served as Permanent Secretary in the Ministry of ICT and Innovation until 2020 when she was elevated from the position of permanent Secretary in the Ministry of ICT and Innovation to the position of state minister in charge of Technical and Vocational Education and Training (TVET) in the Ministry of Education. Irere Claudette also served as the Director General in charge of Innovation and Business Development at the Ministry of Information Technology and Communications (MiTEC), Government of Rwanda
