= College of Science and Technology (Rwanda) =

University in Kigali, Rwanda

College of Science and Technology - University of Rwanda
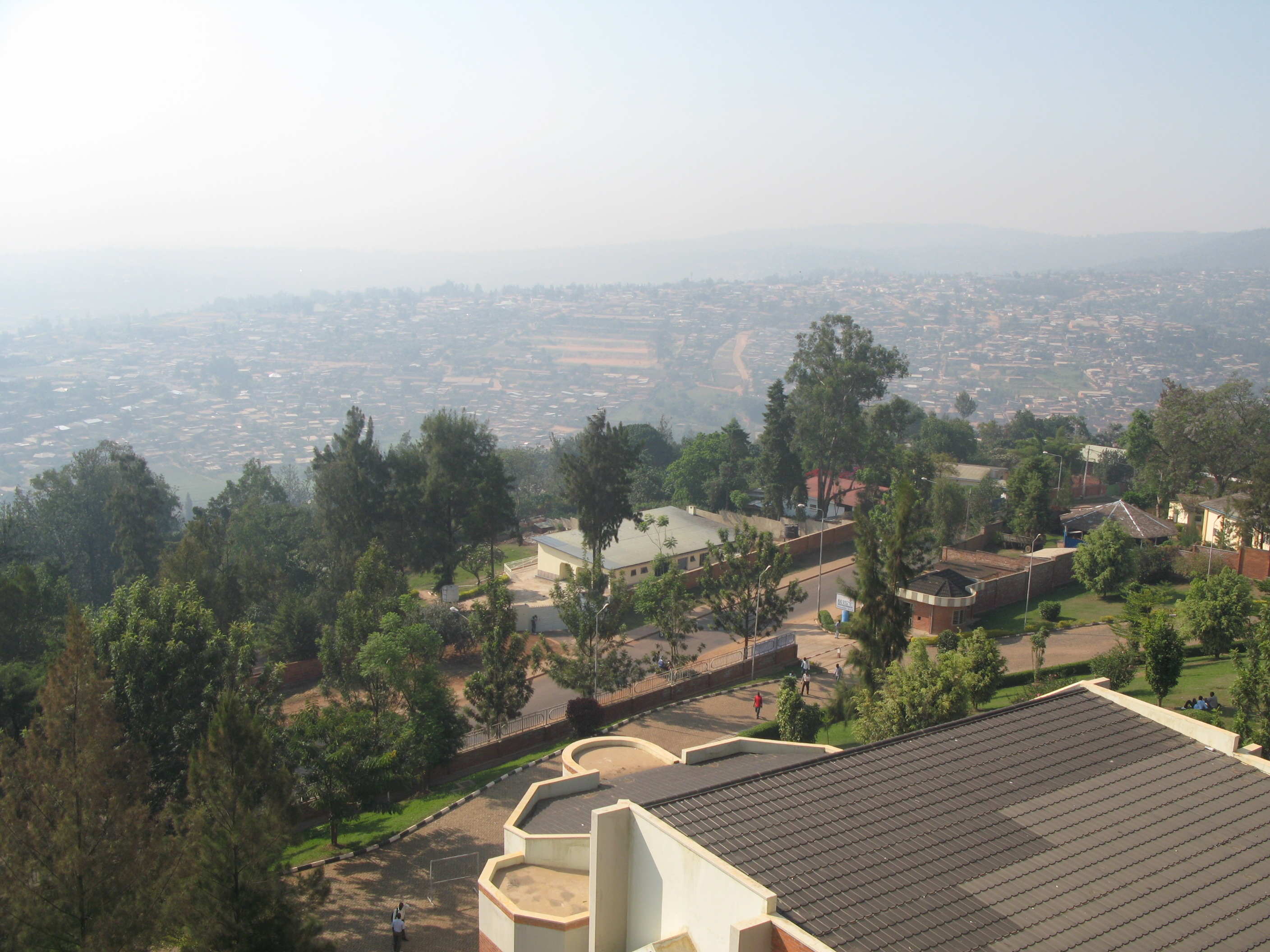
- Former names: Kigali Institute of Science, and Technology
- Type: Public
- Established: November 1997
- Location: Kigali, Rwanda
- Campus: Urban
- Nickname: CST
- Website: University website

College of Science and Technology - University of Rwanda, the former Kigali Institute of Science, and Technology (KIST, Kinyarwanda: Ishuri Rikuru ry'Ubumenyi n'Ikoranabuhanga rya Kigali, French: Institut des Sciences et des Technologies de Kigali) in Kigali, Rwanda is the first technology-focused institution of higher education to be created by the Rwanda government.

KIST was established in November 1997. Major partners in its creation were the Ministry of Education, the UNDP Rwanda, and GTZ, a German enterprise.

The College of Science and Technology (CST) was established by the Government of Rwanda LAW N° 71/2013 OF 10/09/2013 ESTABLISHING THE UNIVERSITY OF RWANDA (UR) AND DETERMINING ITS MISSION, POWERS, ORGANISATION AND FUNCTIONING as a Technology specialized college in teaching and training of highly skilled personnel in the fields of pure and applied sciences and engineering to fast track national development.

In line with the Government's commitment to achieve the goals and objectives clearly set out in the country's EDPRS 2 and the Vision 2020, the College of Science and Technology (CST) is one of the six specialized colleges that are under the University of Rwanda, CST therefore plays a key role in teaching and research, reaching out to the community and supporting the private sector with highly skilled labour.

== Awards ==
KIST has won two Ashden Awards, one in 2005 for their work with biogas plants to process sewage at prisons and provide gas for cooking, and another in 2002 for the development of a fuel-efficient bread oven.

Kigali Institute of Science and Technology was a military academy located in the heart of the capital city Kigali until 1994. After the 1994 Genocide, the president of Rwanda decided to move all military outside the city and transform it into an international school of sciences. Today it is ranked in the top 100 universities on the continent. Kigali institute of science and technology (KIST) is the first major university in Kigali the capital and administrative city of Rwanda. It is equipped with modern tools of technology like a 400 million dollar computer lab donated by the African Development Bank in 2009. It is said its one of the successful schools on the continent.

== See also ==
- Category:College of Science and Technology (Rwanda) alumni
