= Ministry of Education (Rwanda) =

Government ministry of Rwanda

- Minisiteri y'Uburezi; Ministère de l'Éducation
- The ministry in Kigali

Agency overview
- Jurisdiction: Government of Rwanda
- Headquarters: KG 7 Avenue, Kacyiru, Kigali
- Minister responsible: Joseph Nsengimana, Minister of Education
- Deputy Minister responsible: Claudette Irere, Minister of State for Education
- Agency executive: Charles Karakye, Permanent Secretary
- Website: www.mineduc.gov.rw

The Ministry of Education (MINEDUC) is the ministry of the Government of Rwanda in charge of education. It oversees schools from nursery to university, as well as technical and vocational training.

The ministry is based in Kacyiru, Kigali. Since September 2024, the minister has been Joseph Nsengimana.

== History ==
The ministry was formerly called the Ministère de l'Éducation, de la Science, de la Technologie et de la Recherche scientifique. Its current name is Minisiteri y'Uburezi in Kinyarwanda and Ministère de l'Éducation in French.

== Role ==
The ministry's mission is "to transform the Rwandan citizen into skilled human capital". It does this by giving equitable access to quality education. The ministry drafts laws, regulations and standards for education. It monitors education policies and reports every year to the Cabinet. It also promotes the use of information and communication technology in teaching, and oversees school construction and teacher training.

The headquarters are on KG 7 Avenue in Kacyiru.

=== Schools, students and staff ===
In 2017, Rwanda had an estimated population of 11.8 million. The ministry oversaw over 13,000 education centres, 93,000 staff and 3.6 million students. Primary and secondary schools are organised in the 30 districts.

MINeDUC Human Resources by School Type (2017)
Levels	Schools	Students	Staff
Pre-nursery	90	5,234	243
Nursery	3,186	220,435	6,812
Primary	2,877	2,540,374	43,906
General Secondary	1,375	531,377	24,561
Technical & Vocational Education & Training (TVET)	402	107,501	6,929
General Tertiary	37	80,773	5,196
Adult Literacy	5,160	152,015	6,287
TOTAL:	13,127	3,637,709	93,934
Source: MINeDUC

== Ministers ==
- Papias Malimba Musafiri (June 2015 – December 2017)
- Eugène Mutimura (December 2017 – February 2020)
- Valentine Uwamariya (February 2020 – August 2023)
- Gaspard Twagirayezu (August 2023 – September 2024)
- Joseph Nsengimana (since September 2024)

=== Ministers of State ===
- Gaspard Twagirayezu (February 2020 – August 2023)
- Claudette Irere (since February 2020)

== See also ==
- Education in Rwanda
- Cabinet of Rwanda
